= List of deputies from Savoie =

This list shows all deputies to the National Assembly of France from the Savoie department.

== List ==
| Election | Legislature | Savoie's 1st constituency | Savoie's 2nd constituency | Savoie's 3rd constituency | Savoie's 4th constituency |
|---|---|---|---|---|---|
| 1988 | 9th | Louis Besson; PS | Michel Barnier; RPR | Roger Rinchet; PS | 4th constituency created in 2010 |
| 1993 | 10th | Gratien Ferrari; UDF | Michel Barnier; RPR | Michel Bouvard; RPR | 4th constituency created in 2010 |
| 1997 | 11th | Dominique Dord; DVD | Hervé Gaymard; UMP | Michel Bouvard; RPR | 4th constituency created in 2010 |
| 2002 | 12th | Dominique Dord; UMP | Hervé Gaymard; UMP | Michel Bouvard; UMP | 4th constituency created in 2010 |
| 2007 | 13th | Dominique Dord; UMP | Hervé Gaymard; UMP | Michel Bouvard; UMP | 4th constituency created in 2010 |
| 2012 | 14th | Dominique Dord; UMP | Hervé Gaymard; UMP | Béatrice Santais; PS | Bernadette Laclais; PS |
| 2017 | 15th | Typhanie Degois; La République En Marche! | Vincent Rolland; Les Republicains | Émilie Bonnivard; Les Republicains | Patrick Mignola; MoDem |
| 2022 | 16th | Marina Ferrari; MoDem | Vincent Rolland; Les Republicains | Émilie Bonnivard; Les Republicains | Jean-François Coulomme; La France Insoumise (NUPES) |
