= Results of the 2024 French legislative election in Savoie =

Following the first round of the 2024 French legislative election on 30 June 2024, runoff elections in each constituency where no candidate received a vote share greater than 50 percent were scheduled for 7 July. Candidates permitted to stand in the runoff elections needed to either come in first or second place in the first round or achieve more than 12.5 percent of the votes of the entire electorate (as opposed to 12.5 percent of the vote share due to low turnout).

== Savoie ==
=== 1st constituency ===
| Candidate | Party or alliance | | First round | | Second round | |
| Candidate | Party or alliance | | Votes | % | Votes | % |
|---|---|---|---|---|---|---|
| Typhanie Degois | Union of the far right | The Republicans | 23,992 | 36.16 | 27,170 | 41.92 |
| Marina Ferrari | Ensemble | Democratic Movement | 23,381 | 35.24 | 37,644 | 58.08 |
| Christel Granata | New Popular Front | Communist Party | 15,212 | 22.93 | | |
| Frédéric Exertier | Ecologists | Independent | 2,292 | 3.45 | | |
| Guy-Alain Peyrard | Reconquête | | 830 | 1.25 | | |
| Adrien Casejuaned | Far-left | Lutte Ouvrière | 451 | 0.68 | | |
| Jean-Pierre Chauveau | Sovereigntist right | Independent | 191 | 0.29 | | |
| Total | | | 66,349 | 100.00 | 64,814 | 100.00 |
| Valid votes | | | 66,349 | 97.48 | 64,814 | 95.50 |
| Invalid votes | | | 584 | 0.86 | 734 | 1.08 |
| Blank votes | | | 1,130 | 1.66 | 2,318 | 3.42 |
| Total votes | | | 68,063 | 100.00 | 67,866 | 100.00 |
| Registered voters/turnout | | | 94,116 | 72.32 | 94,122 | 72.10 |

=== 2nd constituency ===
| Candidate | Party or alliance | | First round | | Second round | |
| Candidate | Party or alliance | | Votes | % | Votes | % |
|---|---|---|---|---|---|---|
| Vincent Rolland | The Republicans | | 18,593 | 36.84 | 30,016 | 60.38 |
| Pauline Ract-Brancaz | Union of the far right | The Republicans | 17,762 | 35.19 | 19,694 | 39.62 |
| Pascale Martinot | New Popular Front | Socialist Party | 11,591 | 22.97 | | |
| Delphine Jaffré | Regionalists | Independent | 1,244 | 2.46 | | |
| Mathieu Ciceri | Sovereigntist right | Debout la France | 488 | 0.97 | | |
| Morgane Betolli | Reconquête | | 441 | 0.87 | | |
| Myriam Rahalia | Far-left | Lutte Ouvrière | 349 | 0.69 | | |
| Total | | | 50,468 | 100.00 | 49,710 | 100.00 |
| Valid votes | | | 50,468 | 97.81 | 49,710 | 95.93 |
| Invalid votes | | | 386 | 0.75 | 490 | 0.95 |
| Blank votes | | | 746 | 1.45 | 1,619 | 3.12 |
| Total votes | | | 51,600 | 100.00 | 51,819 | 100.00 |
| Registered voters/turnout | | | 75,626 | 68.23 | 75,611 | 68.53 |

=== 3rd constituency ===
| Candidate | Party or alliance | | First round | | Second round | |
| Candidate | Party or alliance | | Votes | % | Votes | % |
|---|---|---|---|---|---|---|
| Emilie Bonnivard | The Republicans | | 21,605 | 40.86 | 31,430 | 61.16 |
| Marie Dauchy | National Rally | | 19,023 | 35.98 | 19,961 | 38.84 |
| Daniel Ibanez | New Popular Front | La France Insoumise | 11,530 | 21.81 | | |
| Pascale Trouvé | Far-left | Lutte Ouvrière | 719 | 1.36 | | |
| Total | | | 52,877 | 100.00 | 51,391 | 100.00 |
| Valid votes | | | 52,877 | 97.82 | 51,391 | 95.90 |
| Invalid votes | | | 355 | 0.66 | 502 | 0.94 |
| Blank votes | | | 821 | 1.52 | 1,696 | 3.16 |
| Total votes | | | 54,053 | 100.00 | 53,589 | 100.00 |
| Registered voters/turnout | | | 74,583 | 72.47 | 74,595 | 71.84 |

=== 4th constituency ===
| Candidate | Party or alliance | | First round | | Second round | |
| Candidate | Party or alliance | | Votes | % | Votes | % |
|---|---|---|---|---|---|---|
| Jean-François Coulomme | New Popular Front | La France Insoumise | 20,164 | 36.61 | 29,313 | 59.02 |
| Brice Bernard | National Rally | | 16,698 | 30.31 | 20,354 | 40.98 |
| Anaïs Gomero | Ensemble | Democratic Movement | 15,357 | 27.88 | | |
| Albin Guillaud | Independent | | 1,194 | 2.17 | | |
| Vincent Thomazo | Sovereigntist right | Debout la France | 1,037 | 1.88 | | |
| Marie Ducruet | Far-left | Lutte Ouvrière | 630 | 1.14 | | |
| Vincent Bernollin | Union of Democrats and Independents (Note: Dissident who ran without the backing of Ensemble) | | 2 | 0.00 | | |
| Total | | | 55,082 | 100.00 | 49,667 | 100.00 |
| Valid votes | | | 55,082 | 97.21 | 49,667 | 88.53 |
| Invalid votes | | | 423 | 0.75 | 1,234 | 2.20 |
| Blank votes | | | 1,157 | 2.04 | 5,202 | 9.27 |
| Total votes | | | 56,662 | 100.00 | 56,103 | 100.00 |
| Registered voters/turnout | | | 79,612 | 71.17 | 79,636 | 70.45 |
