= Gaymard =

Gaymard is a French surname. Notable people with the surname include:

- Clara Gaymard (born 1960), French businesswoman
- Hervé Gaymard (born 1960), French politician
