= Jean-Baptiste Monnot =

Jean-Baptiste Monnot (French: [ʒɑ̃ batist mɔnɔ]) is a French organist, born in Eu on August 4, 1984.

== Biography ==
=== Studies and competitions ===
Born in 1984 in Eu, Jean-Baptiste Monnot discovered the organ at the age of 12 when he heard the Cavaillé-Coll organ from the Saint-Jacques church, in Le Tréport. He first studied the piano with Hervé Gringoire, then the organ at the Dieppe National Music School with Nicolas Pien and Yvette Martin. In 1999 he entered the Conservatoire national de région de Rouen, where he studied with Louis Thiry and François Ménissier. He was awarded the Gold Medal in 2002, the First Prize for Improvisation in 2003 and the First Prize of Excellence in 2004. In 2002, he unanimously won the first prize of the Fourth Young Organist Competition of Saint-Germain- des-Fossés chaired by Marie-Claire Alain.

In 2004 at the age of 19, he entered the National Conservatory of Music and Dance in Paris, in the class of Olivier Latry and Michel Bouvard and obtained the higher education diploma in 2007. He also studied with Bernhard Haas at the State University of Music and Performing Arts Stuttgart.

=== Career ===
On December 24, 2021, he accompanied with Oswald Sallaberger a very special office celebrated by Father Bertrand Laurent in Saint-Ouen de Rouen, since no Christmas Eve had been celebrated in this place for probably more than forty years, according to Henry. Decaëns.

== Invention ==
He is also the main designer and performer of the Orgue du Voyage. Transportable and modular, this unique electronic transmission instrument allows aesthetic and educational use in various places such as Nantes Cathedral, Saint-Maximin basilica, Vaucelles Abbey or the Louvre Pyramid. With its eight independent modules, it is more practical than the one that Pierre Cochereau had built by organ builder Philippe Hartmann. His invention remains mainly in the chevet-apse chapel of the Saint-Ouen abbey in Rouen.
