= Martine Berthet =

French politician (born 1961)

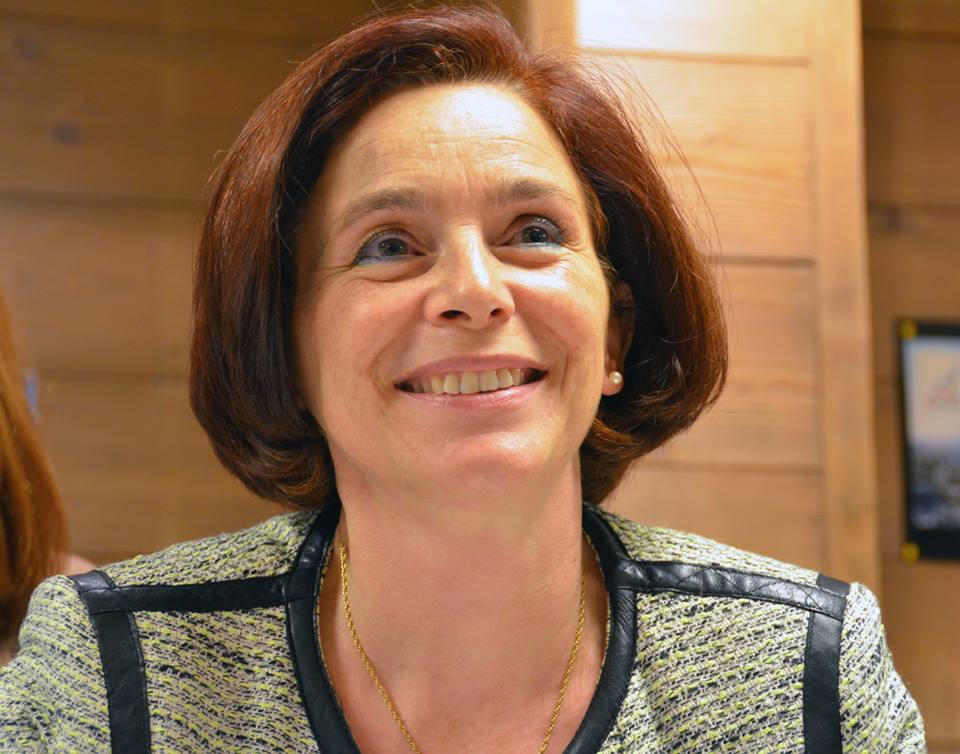

Senator for Savoie
- Incumbent
- Assumed office 24 September 2017

Personal details
- Born: 27 March 1961 (age 65)
- Party: The Republicans

Martine Berthet (born 27 March 1961) is a French politician of the Republicans (LR). She was the mayor of Albertville, Savoie between 2014 and 2017 and became a senator for Savoie in 2017.

== Career ==
Berthet was a deputy mayor of Ugine, Savoie from 2001 to 2014. She participated in the creation of the Région d'Albertville community of communes.

On 4 April 2014 she was elected mayor of Albertville by the newly elected municipal council. She was the first female mayor of the city.

In the 2015 departmental elections, Berthet stood along with Hervé Gaymard in the canton of Albertville-1. They were elected with more than 61 percent of the votes.

On 24 September 2017 Berthet was elected a senator for Savoie for The Republicans party after Michel Bouvard's resignation. She was the first female senator for the Savoie department.

During the 2017 The Republicans leadership election, she endorsed candidate Laurent Wauquiez, who won the election. Ahead of the 2022 presidential elections, she publicly declared her support for Michel Barnier as the Republicans’ candidate.
