= Cantons of the Savoie department =

The following is a list of the 19 cantons of the Savoie department, in France, following the French canton reorganisation which came into effect in March 2015:

- Aix-les-Bains-1
- Aix-les-Bains-2
- Albertville-1
- Albertville-2
- Bourg-Saint-Maurice
- Bugey savoyard
- Chambéry-1
- Chambéry-2
- Chambéry-3
- Modane
- Montmélian
- La Motte-Servolex
- Moûtiers
- Le Pont-de-Beauvoisin
- La Ravoire
- Saint-Alban-Leysse
- Saint-Jean-de-Maurienne
- Saint-Pierre-d'Albigny
- Ugine
