= Dominique Dord =

French politician

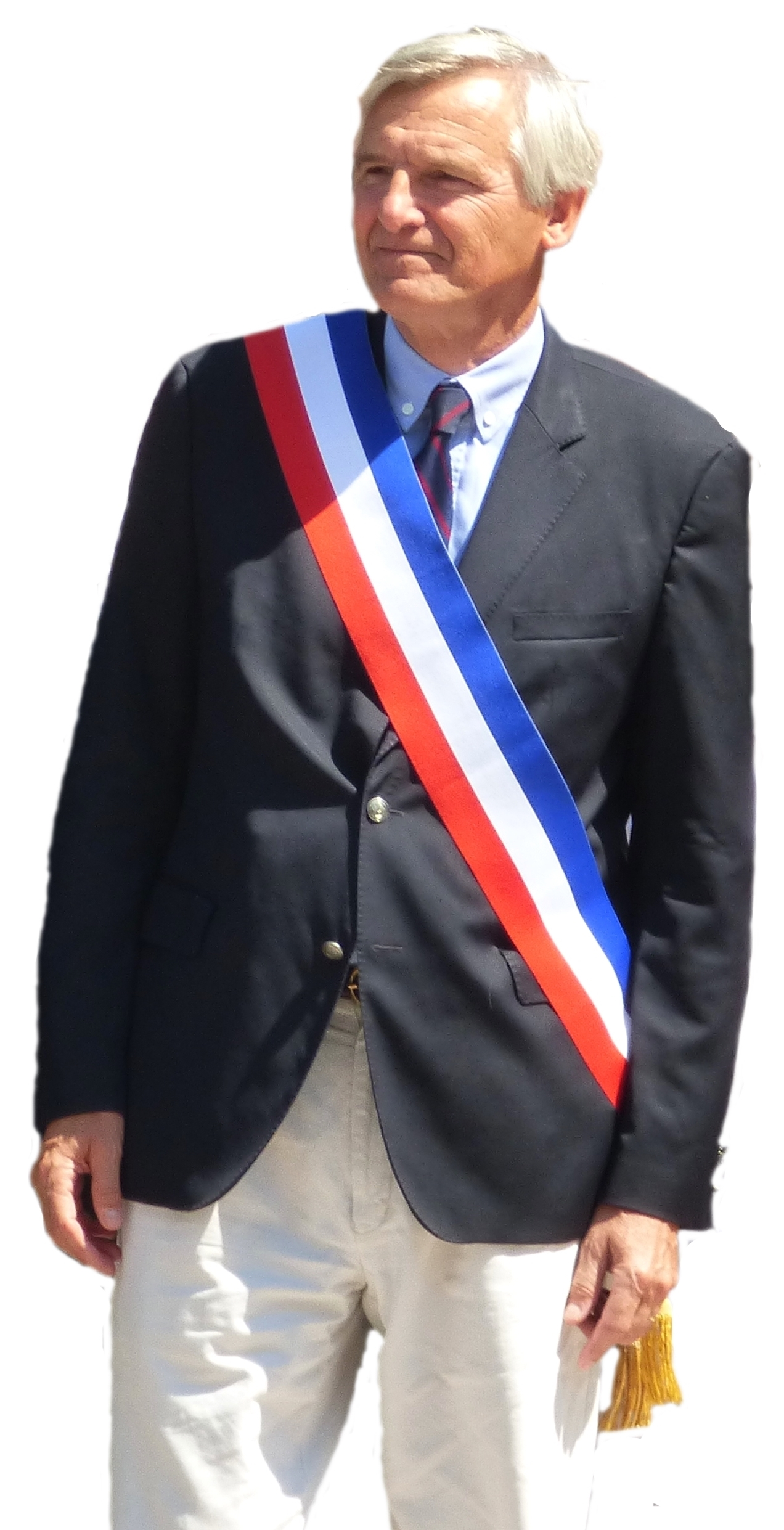
- Dord in 2017

Mayor of Aix-les-Bains
- In office 2001–2018
- Preceded by: André Grosjean
- Succeeded by: Renaud Beretti

Member of the National Assembly for Savoie's 1st constituency
- In office 1997–2017
- Preceded by: Gratien Ferrari
- Succeeded by: Typhanie Degois

Personal details
- Born: 1 September 1959 (age 67) Chambéry, France
- Party: The Republicans
- Education: Jean Moulin University Lyon 3 HEC Paris

Dominique Dord (born 1 September 1959 in Chambéry, Savoie) is a French politician of the French Republican Party who served as a member of the National Assembly of France between 1997 and 2017. He represented the Savoie department, He is also the mayor of Aix-les-Bains since 2001.

In the Republicans’ 2016 presidential primaries, Dort endorsed François Fillon as the party's candidate for the office of President of France.

Dominique Dord is a graduate of the Jean Moulin University Lyon 3 and HEC Paris.
