= Savoie's 3rd constituency =

Constituency of the National Assembly of France

3rd Constituency of Savoie
- inline Constituency of the National Assembly of France

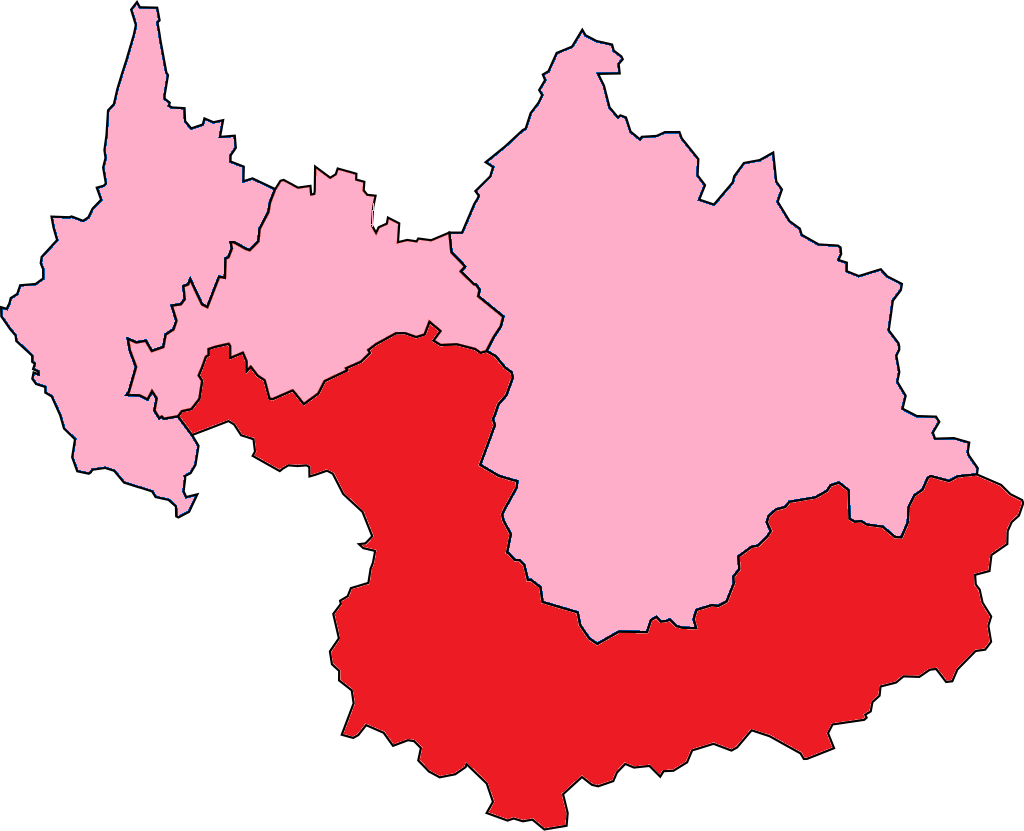
- Savoie's 3rd Constituency shown within Savoie
- Deputy: Émilie Bonnivard; LR
- Department: Savoie
- Cantons: Aiguebelle, La Chambre, Chamoux-sur-Gelon, Lanslebourg-Mont-Cenis, Modane, Montmélian, La Ravoire, La Rochette, Saint-Jean-de-Maurienne, Saint-Michel-de-Maurienne
- Registered voters: 72,714

The 3rd constituency of the Savoie (French: Troisième circonscription de la Savoie) is a French legislative constituency in the Savoie département. Like the other 576 French constituencies, it elects one MP using a two round electoral system.

== Description ==
The 3rd constituency of Savoie covers the southern edge of the department along the border of France and Italy.

The constituency has fluctuated between centre left and conservative deputies. Boundary changes prior to the 2012 have substantially altered the seat, removing the parts of Chambéry it had previously contained.

== Assembly Members ==
Election	Member	Party
1988	Roger Rinchet	PS
1993	Michel Bouvard	RPR
1997	Michel Bouvard	RPR
2002	Michel Bouvard	UMP
2007	Michel Bouvard	UMP
2012	Béatrice Santais	PS
2017	Émilie Bonnivard	LR
2022	Émilie Bonnivard	LR
2024	Émilie Bonnivard	LR

== Election results ==
=== 2024 ===
Legislative Election 2024: Savoie's 3rd constituency
Party	Candidate	Votes	%	±%
LFI (NFP)	Daniel Ibanez	11,530	21.81	−0.95
RN	Marie Dauchy	19,023	35.98	+ 16.41
LR	Émilie Bonnivard	21,605	40.86	+7.76
LO	Pascale Trouvé	719	1.36	n/a
Turnout		52,877	97.82	−45.16
Registered electors		74,583		
2nd round result
LR	Émilie Bonnivard	31,430	61.16	−4.38
RN	Marie Dauchy	19,961	38.84	n/a
Turnout		51,391	95.90	+46.04
Registered electors		74,595		
LR hold		Swing		

=== 2022 ===
Legislative Election 2022: Savoie's 3rd constituency
Party	Candidate	Votes	%	±%
LR (UDC)	Émilie Bonnivard	12,788	33.10	+12.37
LFI (NUPÉS)	Nathalie Krawezynski	8,793	22.76	+4.50
RN	Marie Dauchy	7,561	19.57	+5.13
MoDem (Ensemble)	Xavier Trosset	6,095	15.78	−16.02
PA	Patricia Nowak	1,029	2.66	N/A
REC	Mikaël Florio	823	2.13	N/A
Others	N/A	1,542	-	−
Turnout		38,631	52.66	+4.34
2nd round result
LR (UDC)	Émilie Bonnivard	23,149	65.54	+11.77
LFI (NUPÉS)	Nathalie Krawezynski	12,170	34.46	N/A
Turnout		35,319	49.86	+11.86
LR hold				

=== 2017 ===
Legislative Election 2017: Savoie's 3rd constituency
Party	Candidate	Votes	%	±%
LREM	Philip Vivier	11,173	31.80	
LR	Émilie Bonnivard	7,285	20.73	
FN	Marie Dauchy	5,074	14.44	
LFI	Alexandre Roux	4,393	12.50	
DIV	Pierre-Marie Charvoz	3,076	8.76	
DVE	Ghislaine Socquet-Juglard	1,119	3.18	
PCF	Laetitia Mimoun	905	2.58	
DLF	Vincent Thomazo	745	2.12	
Others	N/A	1,364		
Turnout		35,134	48.32	
2nd round result
LR	Émilie Bonnivard	14,857	53.77	
LREM	Philip Vivier	12,776	46.23	
Turnout		27,633	38.00	
LR gain from PS				

=== 2012 ===
Legislative Election 2012: Savoie's 3rd constituency
Party	Candidate	Votes	%	±%
PS	Béatrice Santais	15,576	37.26	
DVD	Pierre-Marie Charvoz	13,685	32.73	
FN	Eric Marmillon	6,715	16.06	
FG	Christiane Lehmann	2,807	6.71	
EELV	Béatrice Faure	1,589	3.80	
Others	N/A	1,434		
Turnout		41,806	59.38	
2nd round result
PS	Béatrice Santais	20,980	52.06	
DVD	Pierre-Marie Charvoz	19,317	47.94	
Turnout		40,297	57.24	
PS gain from UMP				

=== 2007 ===
Legislative Election 2007: Savoie's 3rd constituency
Party	Candidate	Votes	%	±%
UMP	Michel Bouvard	23,888	42.46	
PS	Bernadette Laclais	13,653	24.27	
MoDem	Patrick Mignola	6,434	11.44	
LV	Elodie Guillerme	2,244	3.99	
DVD	Daniel Dufreney	2,230	3.96	
FN	Marie-Jeanne Megevand	2,010	3.57	
PCF	Michel Vallet	1,751	3.11	
EXG	Myriam Combet	1,624	2.89	
Others	N/A	2,189		
Turnout		56,994	59.49	
2nd round result
UMP	Michel Bouvard	29,483	54.57	
PS	Bernadette Laclais	24,547	45.43	
Turnout		55,303	57.73	
UMP hold				

=== 2002 ===
Legislative Election 2002: Savoie's 3rd constituency
Party	Candidate	Votes	%	±%
UMP	Michel Bouvard	25,191	44.78	
PS	Bernadette Laclais	14,234	25.30	
FN	Jean-Marie Richard-Chevalier	6,199	11.02	
LV	Nicole Guilhaudin	2,549	4.53	
PCF	Michel Vallet	2,437	4.33	
REG	Jean Blanc	1,564	2.78	
PR	Roger Favier	1,378	2.45	
Others	N/A	2,702		
Turnout		57,146	64.19	
2nd round result
UMP	Michel Bouvard	29,078	58.40	
PS	Bernadette Laclais	20,709	41.60	
Turnout		51,298	57.63	
UMP hold				

=== 1997 ===
Legislative Election 1997: Savoie's 3rd constituency
Party	Candidate	Votes	%	±%
RPR	Michel Bouvard	16,059	30.59	
PS	Pierre-Louis Rémy	12,659	24.12	
FN	Jean-Marie Barbier	7,217	13.75	
PCF	Alain Bouvier	5,274	10.05	
LV	Nicole Guilhaudin	3,037	5.79	
GE	Janie Constantin	1,273	2.43	
DIV	Jean-François Peudon	1,141	2.17	
LDI	Jean Dominici	1,056	2.01	
Others	N/A	2,462		
Turnout		55,144	65.86	
2nd round result
RPR	Michel Bouvard	28,745	51.28	
PS	Pierre-Louis Rémy	27,313	48.72	
Turnout		59,434	70.99	
RPR hold				
