= Arrondissements of the Savoie department =

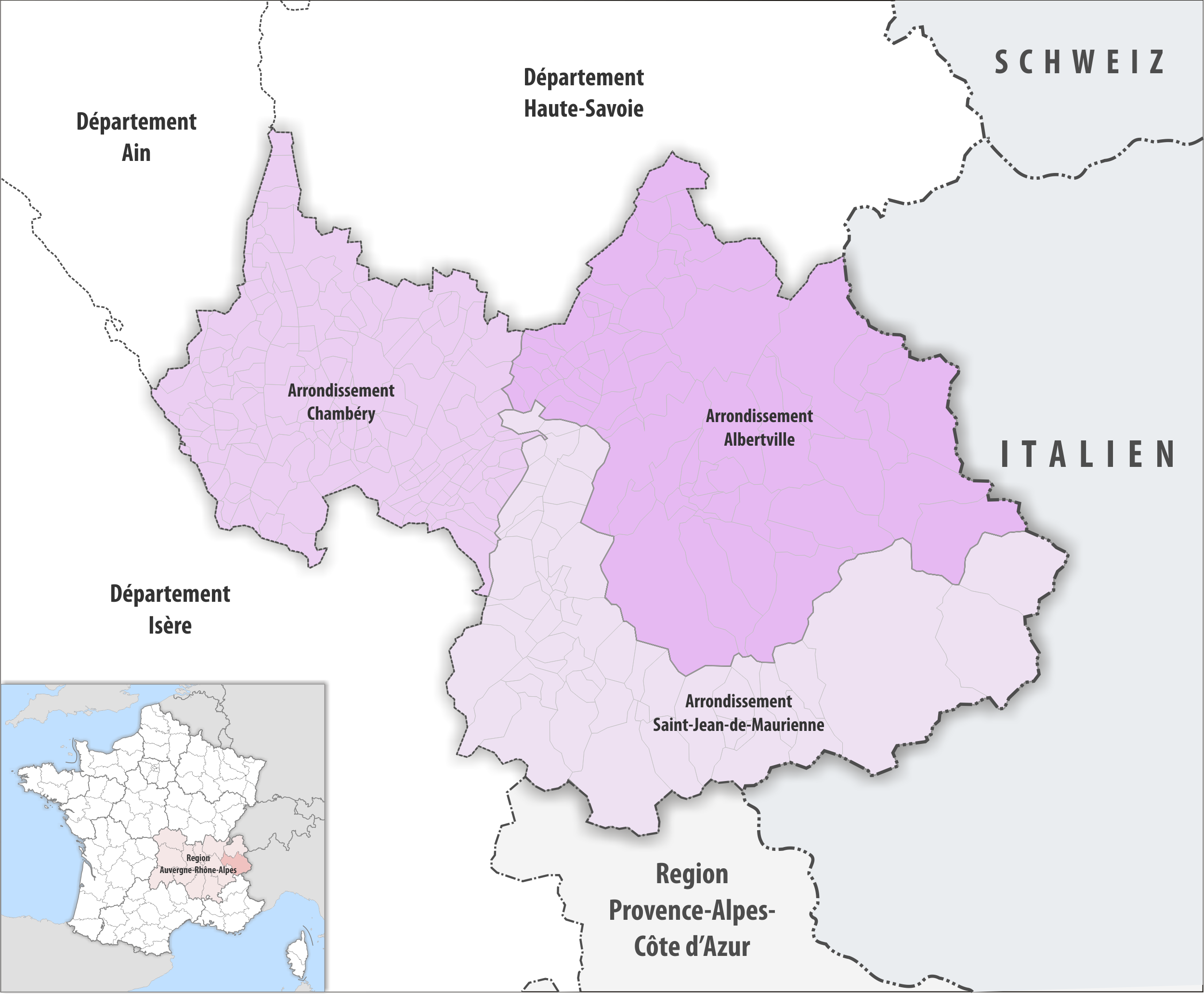
Map of arrondissements of the Savoie department.

The 3 arrondissements of the Savoie department are:

1. Arrondissement of Albertville, (subprefecture: Albertville) with 69 communes. The population of the arrondissement was 112,228 in 2021.
2. Arrondissement of Chambéry, (prefecture of the Savoie department: Chambéry) with 151 communes. The population of the arrondissement was 287,551 in 2021.
3. Arrondissement of Saint-Jean-de-Maurienne, (subprefecture: Saint-Jean-de-Maurienne) with 53 communes. The population of the arrondissement was 42,689 in 2021.

== History ==
In 1860 the arrondissements of Chambéry, Albertville, Moûtiers and Saint-Jean-de-Maurienne were established. The arrondissement of Moûtiers was disbanded in 1926.
