= Savoie's 2nd constituency =

Constituency of the National Assembly of France

2nd Constituency of Savoie
- inline Constituency of the National Assembly of France

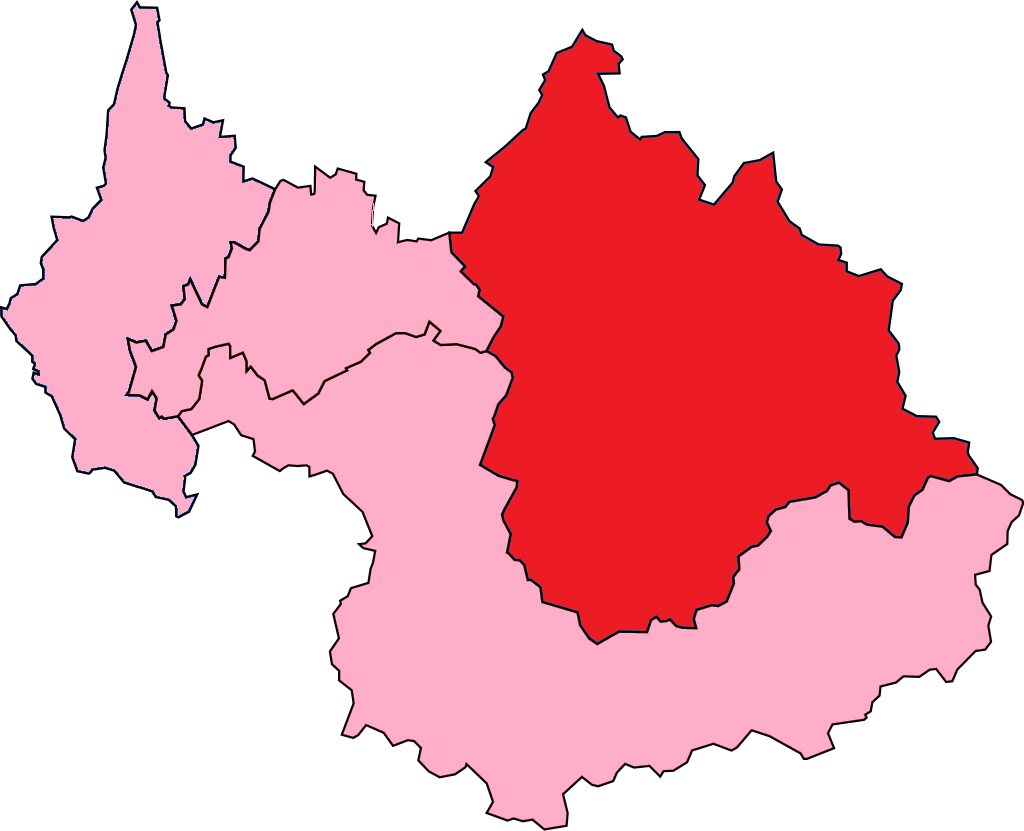
- Savoie's 2nd Constituency shown within Savoie
- Deputy: Vincent Rolland; LR
- Department: Savoie
- Cantons: Aime, Albertville Nord, Albertville Sud, Beaufort, Bourg-Saint-Maurice, Bozel, Moûtiers, Ugine
- Registered voters: 76029

The 2nd constituency of the Savoie (French: Deuxième circonscription de la Haute-Savoie) is a French legislative constituency in the Savoie département. Like the other 576 French constituencies, it elects one MP using a two round electoral system.

== Description ==
The 2nd constituency of Savoie covers a large mountainous area in the east of the department and includes the town of Albertville.

The voters of the constituency have supported conservative candidates without exception at every election since 1988.

== Assembly Members ==
Election	Member	Party
1958	Joseph Fontanet	MRP
1962	Joseph Fontanet	MRP
1967	Joseph Fontanet	PDM
1968	Joseph Fontanet	PDM
1973	Joseph Fontanet	PDM
1978	Michel Barnier	RPR
1981	Michel Barnier	RPR
1986	Michel Barnier	RPR
1988	Michel Barnier	RPR
1993	Michel Barnier	RPR
1997	Hervé Gaymard	RPR
2002	Hervé Gaymard	UMP
2007	Hervé Gaymard	UMP
2012	Hervé Gaymard	UMP
2017	Vincent Rolland	LR
2022	Vincent Rolland	LR
2024	Vincent Rolland	LR

== Election results ==
=== 2024 ===
Legislative Election 2024: Savoie's 2nd constituency
Party	Candidate	Votes	%	±%
LR	Vincent Rolland	18,593	36.84	+6004
LR (UXD)	Pauline Ract-Brancaz	17,762	35.19	+15.45
REC	Morgane Bettoli	441	0.87	−1.57
DLF	Mathieu Ciceri	488	0.97	N/A
DIV	Delphine Jaffré	1,244	2.46	N/A
LO	Myriam Rahalia	349	0.69	N/A
PS (NFP)	Pascale Martinot	11,591	22.97	N/A
Turnout		50,468	97.81	+51.48
Registered electors		75,626		
2nd round result
LR	Vincent Rolland	30,016	60.38	−3.70
LR (UXD)	Pauline Ract-Brancaz	19,694	39.62	N/A
Turnout		49,710	95.93	+51.90
Registered electors		75,611		
LR hold		Swing		

=== 2022 ===
Legislative Election 2022: Savoie's 2nd constituency
Party	Candidate	Votes	%	±%
LR (UDC)	Vincent Rolland	10,720	30.80	-2.07
LFI (NUPÉS)	Cédric Morand	7,635	21.94	+1.15
RN	Brice Bernard	6,870	19.74	+7.48
LREM (Ensemble)	Arthur Empereur	5,470	15.72	N/A
DVE	Flora Bussy	1,064	3.06	N/A
REC	Anne-Sophie Wurtz	850	2.44	N/A
Others	N/A	2,194	-	−
Turnout		34,803	46.33	+2.68
2nd round result
LR (UDC)	Vincent Rolland	20,474	64.08	+6.91
LFI (NUPÉS)	Cédric Morand	11,479	35.92	N/A
Turnout		31,953	44.03	+11.64
LR hold				

=== 2017 ===
Legislative Election 2017: Savoie's 2nd constituency
Party	Candidate	Votes	%	±%
LR	Vincent Rolland	10,406	32.87	−13.01
DIV	Philipe Troutot	8,253	26.07	N/A
FN	Jean-Marie Garcin	3,880	12.26	−1.06
LFI	Viviane Nogues	3,864	12.21	N/A
EELV	Yves Durieux	1,876	5.93	+0.40
PCF	Nataline Chareyron	840	2.65	−4.37
Others	N/A	2,540		
Turnout		31,659	41.65	−12.65
2nd round result
LR	Vincent Rolland	14,076	57.17	−1.02
DIV	Philipe Troutot	10,547	42.83	N/A
Turnout		24,623	32.39	−16.14
LR hold				

=== 2012 ===
Legislative Election 2012: Savoie's 2nd constituency
Party	Candidate	Votes	%	±%
UMP	Hervé Gaymard	18,702	45.88	−5.05
PS	François Rieu	10,856	26.63	+2.22
FN	Robert Bonnet Ligeon	5,430	13.32	+9.10
FG	Henri Morandini	2,863	7.02	+3.68
EELV	Yves Paccalet	2,252	5.53	+1.70
Others	N/A	656		
Turnout		40,759	54.30	−2.34
2nd round result
UMP	Hervé Gaymard	21,198	58.19	N/A
PS	François Rieu	15,230	41.81	N/A
Turnout		36,428	48.53	N/A
UMP hold				

=== 2007 ===
Legislative Election 2007: Savoie's 2nd constituency
Party	Candidate	Votes	%	±%
UMP	Hervé Gaymard	24,046	50.93	+0.01
PS	André Vairetto	11,523	24.41	−0.28
MoDem	Jean-François Giraud	2,867	6.07	N/A
FN	Robert Bonnet-Ligeon	1,990	4.22	−5.55
LV	Alexandra Cusey	1,806	3.83	+0.63
PCF	Gilles Cointy	1,578	3.34	−0.82
EXG	Oriane Champanhet	1,062	2.25	N/A
Others	N/A	2,338		
Turnout		47,992	56.64	−4.34
UMP hold				

=== 2002 ===
Legislative Election 2002: Savoie's 2nd constituency
Party	Candidate	Votes	%	±%
UMP	Hervé Gaymard	24,232	50.92	+13.69
PS	André Vairetto	11,749	24.69	+3.24
FN	Bernadette Sondaz	4,651	9.77	−3.21
PCF	Philippe Perrier	1,981	4.16	−7.22
LV	Danièle Rabiller	1,521	3.20	−1.32
REG	Guy Martin	1,122	2.36	N/A
Others	N/A	2,334		
Turnout		48,290	60.98	−1.91
UMP hold				

=== 1997 ===
Legislative Election 1997: Savoie's 2nd constituency
Party	Candidate	Votes	%	±%
RPR	Hervé Gaymard	16,276	37.23	
PS	André Vairetto	9,378	21.45	
FN	Gérard Trouillard	5,673	12.98	
PCF	Louis Bertrand	4,975	11.38	
LV	Michel Roulet	1,978	4.52	
GE	Benjamin Berthel	1,072	2.45	
DIV	Rémy Pellegrin	977	2.23	
DVD	Gérard Maudrux	922	2.11	
Others	N/A	2,465		
Turnout		46,841	62.89	
2nd round result
RPR	Hervé Gaymard	24,920	53.87	
PS	André Vairetto	21,336	46.13	
Turnout		49,089	65.92	
RPR hold				
