= Typhanie Degois =

French politician (born 1993)

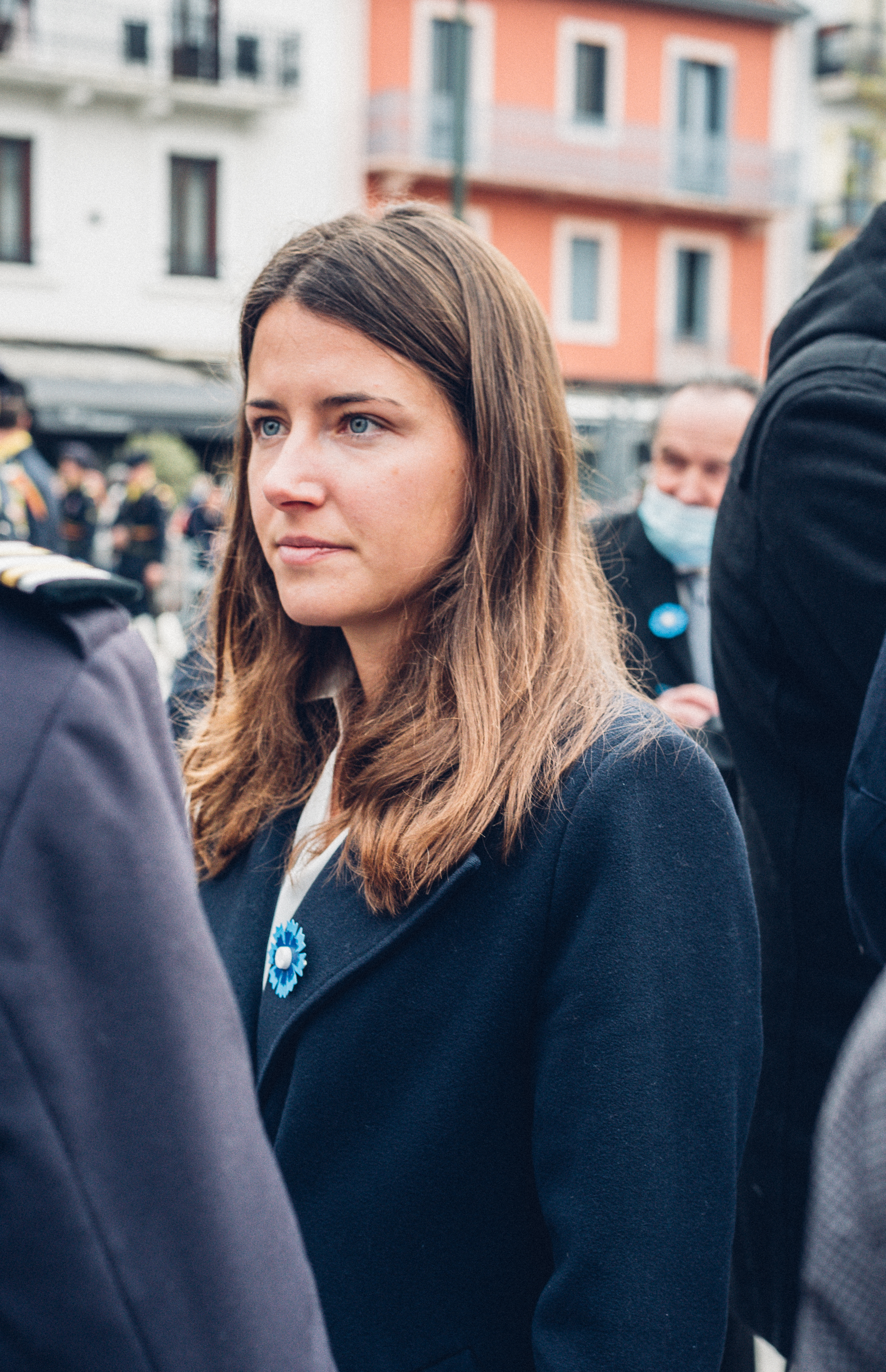
- Degois in 2021

Member of the National Assembly for Savoie's 1st constituency
- In office 21 June 2017 – 21 June 2022
- Preceded by: Dominique Dord
- Succeeded by: Marina Ferrari

Personal details
- Born: 6 January 1993 (age 33) Fourmies, France
- Party: LR (since 2024)
- Other political affiliations: UDI (2013–2014); LREM (2016–2024)
- Education: Panthéon-Assas University
- Occupation: Jurist • Politician

Typhanie Degois (French pronunciation: [tifani dəɡwa]; born 6 January 1993) is a French politician who represented Savoie's 1st constituency of in the National Assembly from 2017 until 2022.

== Early life and education ==
Degois was born in Northern France and moved to Savoie at the age of 7. She graduated from Pantheon-Assas University with a master's degree in international business law. Degois is a member of the Fondation Brigitte Bardot, an animal-rights group.

== Political career ==
Degois joined the centre-right Union of Democrats and Independents in 2013 but left after a year. Degois joined En Marche! the day after it was founded and established a chapter of the movement in Aix-les-Bains. In the 2017 French legislative election, she was elected to the French Parliament with 50.76% of the vote in Savoie's 1st constituency, narrowly defeating Dominique Dord of The Republicans who had held the seat for the previous 20 years. At age 24, she was the youngest member of the National Assembly of En Marche!, as well as the second youngest overall after Ludovic Pajot of the National Front.

In Parliament, Degois served as member of the Committee on Economic Affairs and the Committee on European Affairs. In addition to her committee assignments, she was a member of the French parliamentary friendship groups with Monaco, the Central African Republic and Azerbaijan. As a parliamentarian, she grew increasingly critical of the La République En Marche group in the National Assembly, voting against key bills supported by a majority of her fellow party members. In May, she announced she would not seek reelection in the 2022 French legislative election.

On the occasion of the 2022 French presidential election, Degois brought her sponsorship of deputy to Marine Le Pen.

In the 2024 French legislative elections, she was jointly invested as a candidate of the National Rally and The Republicans in Savoie's 1st constituency.

== Political positions ==
In July 2019, Degois voted in favour of the French ratification of the European Union's Comprehensive Economic and Trade Agreement (CETA) with Canada.
