= Savoie's 1st constituency =

Constituency of the National Assembly of France

1st constituency of Savoie
- inline Constituency of the National Assembly of France

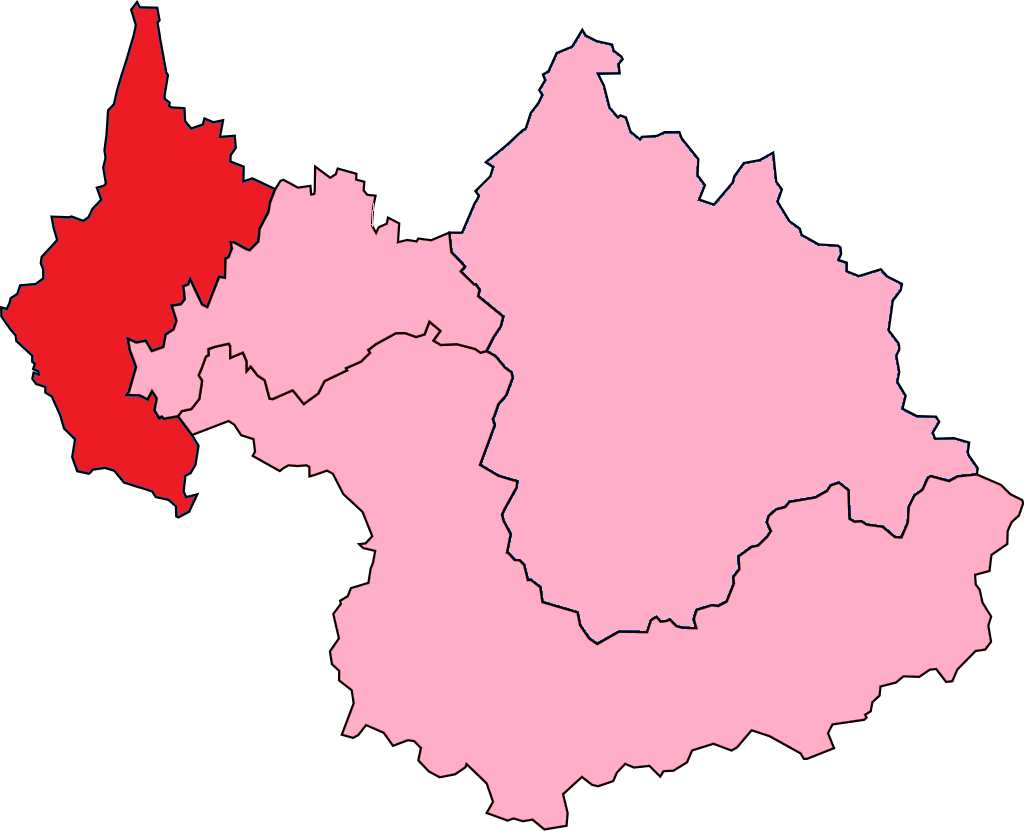
- Savoie's 1st Constituency shown within Savoie
- Deputy: Marina Ferrari; MoDem
- Department: Savoie
- Cantons: Aix-les-Bains Centre, Aix-les-Bains Nord-Grésy, Aix-les-Bains Sud, Albens, Les Echelles, La Motte-Servolex, Le Pont-de-Beauvoisin, Ruffieux, Saint-Genix-sur-Guiers, Yenne
- Registered voters: 87087

The 1st constituency of the Savoie (French: Deuxième circonscription de la Haute-Savoie) is a French legislative constituency in the Savoie département. Like the other 576 French constituencies, it elects one MP using a two round electoral system.

== Description ==
The 1st constituency of Savoie is in the west of the department and includes the spa town of Aix-les-Bains.

The 1988 election was the only occasion when this seat has elected a candidate from the left. From 1993 to 2017 the seat was represented by centre right deputies, this run was ended by the victory of En Marche! against The Republicans by the narrow margin of 51% to 49% in the second round.

== Assembly Members ==
Election	Member	Party
1988	Louis Besson	PS
1993	Gratien Ferrari	UDF
1997	Dominique Dord	DVD
2002	Dominique Dord	UMP
2007	Dominique Dord	UMP
2012	Dominique Dord	UMP
2017	Typhanie Degois	LREM
2022	Marina Ferrari	MoDem
2024	Marina Ferrari	MoDem

== Election results ==
=== 2024 ===
Legislative Election 2024: Savoie's 1st constituency
Party	Candidate	Votes	%	±%
REC	Guy-Alain Peyrard	830	1.25	−2.31
LO	Adrien Casejuane	451	0.68	N/A
EXD	Jean-Pierre Chauveau	191	0.29	N/A
PCF (NFP)	Christel Granata	15,212	22.93	+1.50
LR (UXD)	Typhanie Degois	23,992	36.16	+16.21
MoDem (Ensemble)	Marina Ferrari	23,381	35.24	+7.84
DVE	Frédéric Exertier	2,292	3.45	+0.12
Turnout		66,349	97.48	+47.07
Registered electors		94,116		
2nd round result
MoDem	Marina Ferrari	37,644	58.08	−1.45
LR	Typhanie Degois	27,170	41.92	N/A
Turnout		64,814	95.50	+48.51
Registered electors		94,122		
MoDem hold		Swing		

=== 2022 ===
Legislative Election 2022: Savoie's 1st constituency
Party	Candidate	Votes	%	±%
MoDem (Ensemble)	Marina Ferrari	12,700	27.40	-6.35
PCF (NUPÉS)	Christel Granata	9,933	21.43	+6.38
RN	Manon Deruem	9,247	19.95	+8.83
LR (UDC)	Karine Dubouchet	5,677	12.25	−17.26
HOR	Jean-Claude Croze*	2,490	5.37	N/A
REC	Beatrix Millord	1,648	3.56	N/A
DVE	Frédéric Exertier	1,545	3.33	+1.35
Others	N/A	3,102	-	−
Turnout		46,342	50.41	+1.66
2nd round result
MoDem (Ensemble)	Marina Ferrari	24,051	59.33	+8.57
PCF (NUPÉS)	Christel Granata	16,490	40.67	N/A
Turnout		40,541	47.39	+3.61
MoDem gain from LREM				

* Horizons candidate not supported by Ensemble alliance.

=== 2017 ===
Legislative Election 2017: Savoie's 1st constituency
Party	Candidate	Votes	%	±%
LREM	Typhanie Degois	14,330	33.75	
LR	Dominique Dord	12,531	29.51	
FN	Jean-Pierre Chauveau	4,721	11.12	
LFI	Thierry Bonnamour	4,721	10.73	
PS	Fatiha Brunetti	1,835	4.32	
DIV	Caroline Carron	1,171	2.76	
Others	N/A	3,315		
Turnout		42,459	48.75	
2nd round result
LREM	Typhanie Degois	19,335	50.76	
LR	Dominique Dord	18,775	49.24	
Turnout		38,130	43.78	
LREM gain from LR				

=== 2012 ===
Legislative Election 2012: Savoie's 1st constituency
Party	Candidate	Votes	%	±%
UMP	Dominique Dord	22,252	46.02	
EELV	Alain Caraco	13,919	28.79	
FN	Véronique Jeanne Drapeau	7,471	15.45	
FG	Brigitte Andreys	2,426	5.02	
Others	N/A	2,282		
Turnout		48,350	58.78	
2nd round result
UMP	Dominique Dord	26,052	59.61	
EELV	Alain Caraco	17,653	40.39	
Turnout		43,705	53.14	
UMP hold				

=== 2007 ===
Legislative Election 2007: Savoie's 1st constituency
Party	Candidate	Votes	%	±%
UMP	Dominique Dord	32,621	51.39	+3.31
PS	Virginie Ferroux	12,163	19.16	−5.32
MoDem	Yann Bezat	5,777	9.10	N/A
LV	Nicole Guilhaudin	3,600	5.67	+1.96
FN	Véronique Drapeau	3,207	5.05	−7.26
PCF	Djamel Keriche	1,646	2.59	+0.12
EXG	Nabil Yahiaoui	1,590	2.50	N/A
Others	N/A	2,875		
Turnout		64,363	59.04	−5.62
UMP hold				

=== 2002 ===
Legislative Election 2002: Savoie's 1st constituency
Party	Candidate	Votes	%	±%
UMP	Dominique Dord	29,932	48.08	N/A
PS	Thierry Repentin	15,240	24.48	−0.74
FN	Ginette Brault	7,664	12.31	−4.92
LV	Benoit Leclair	2,311	3.71	−1.01
PCF	Sophie Coquemer	1,535	2.47	−3.88
Others	N/A	5,571		
Turnout		63,297	64.66	−1.55
2nd round result
UMP	Dominique Dord	33,588	61.76	N/A
PS	Thierry Repentin	20,797	38.24	−8.30
Turnout		56,301	57.51	−13.57
UMP gain from PR				

=== 1997 ===
Legislative Election 1997: Savoie's 1st constituency
Party	Candidate	Votes	%	±%
PR (UDF)	Dominique Dord	18,056	32.76	
PS	Thierry Repentin	13,900	25.22	
FN	Georges Ract	9,495	17.23	
PCF	Marie-Joëlle Chanoux	3,498	6.35	
LV	Benoït Leclair	2,601	4.72	
LO	Christian Mottais	1,363	2.47	
GE	Brigitte Roue	1,476	2.68	
LDI	Pierre-Marie Michalland	1,344	2.44	
Others	N/A	3,382		
Turnout		58,563	66.21	
2nd round result
PR (UDF)	Dominique Dord	31,473	53.46	
PS	Thierry Repentin	27,404	46.54	
Turnout		62,870	71.08	
PR hold				
