= Michel Bouvard =

French politician

Member of the French Senate for Savoie
- In office 1 October 2014 – 1 October 2017
- Preceded by: Thierry Repentin
- Succeeded by: Martine Berthet

Member of the National Assembly for Savoie's 3rd constituency
- In office 1 April 1993 – 19 June 2012
- Preceded by: Roger Rinchet
- Succeeded by: Béatrice Santais

Personal details
- Born: 17 March 1955 (age 71) Argenteuil, France
- Party: UMP

Michel Bouvard (born 17 March 1955 in Argenteuil, Val-d'Oise) is a member of the National Assembly of France. He represents the Savoie department and is a member of the Union for a Popular Movement.
