= Clara Gaymard =

French business executive

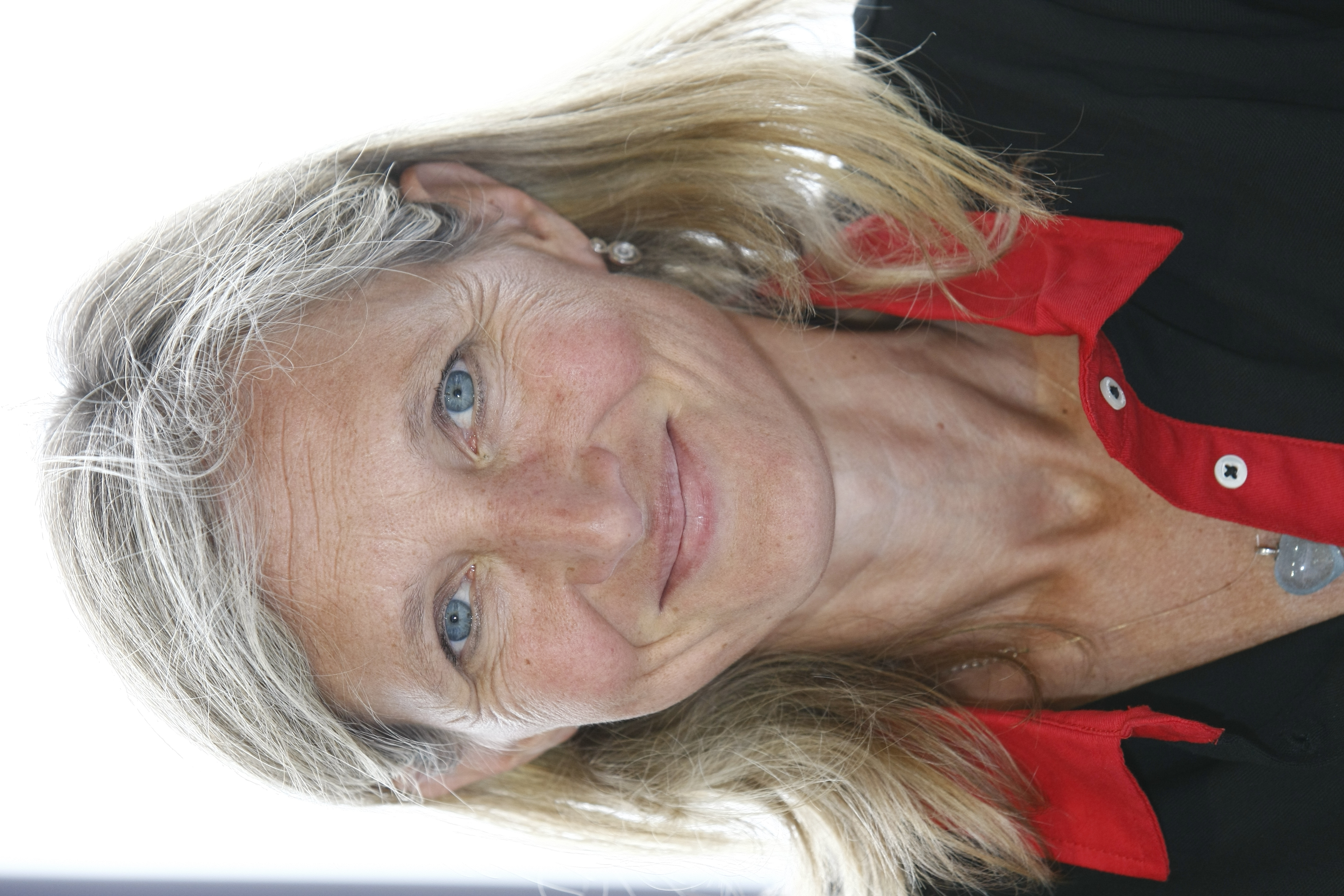
- Clara Gaymard in 2008
- Born: Clara Lejeune; 27 January 1960 (age 66); Paris, France
- Education: Sciences Po, ÉNA
- Occupations: President, and CEO of General Electric France
- Spouse: Hervé Gaymard (m. 1986)
- Children: 9
- Parent: Jérôme Lejeune (father)

Clara Gaymard (née Lejeune; born 27 January 1960) is a French businesswoman, official and author. She co-founded RAISE, an investment fund and philanthropic group which promotes entrepreneurial growth. She was the president of GE France from 2006 to 2016 and vice-president of GE International from 2009 to 2016.

== Education ==
She received a degree from Sciences Po and is an alumna of the École nationale d'administration.

== Career ==
She served as an administrative officer to the Mayor of Paris from 1982 until 1984, when she went to study at the ENA. On graduating, she became an auditor at the court of auditors, and was appointed advisor for referendums in 1990. Thereafter she was assistant to the head of economic expansion services in Cairo (1991-1993), becoming head of the European Union office (sub-directorate of Europe) at the Directorate of External Economic Relations (DREE) in the Ministry of the Economy and Finance.

In June 1995 she was asked by Colette Codaccioni, the minister for inter-generational cohesion, to direct her office. She then joined the sub-directorate focusing on supporting SMEs and regional action at the DREE (1996-1999), then as the head delegate to SMEs (1999-2003). In 2002, the economy and finance minister, Francis Mer, refused to nominate her to lead the DREE, saying:

Clara, vous avez neuf enfants, un mari qui fait de la politique. Je suis contre. (Clara, you have nine children, a husband in politics. I am against it)

In February she left the DREE being appointed the Goodwill ambassador for International Investment and president of the French Agency for International Investment (AFII).

In September 2006, she joined General Electric, as the CEO and President of GE France, and later, in 2008, as the President of the Region of North Western Europe. While president and CEO of GE France, Clara Gaymard was, in April 2009, appointed the vice-president of GE International in charge of government contracts (GE International for Government Sales and Strategy), then, in August 2010, as vice-president of government and cities.

In 2014, she used her expertise and strong network to argue for the acquisition of Alstom by GE. In 2015, she began an attempt to have a net increase of 1000 jobs, within GE France. She was trying to achieve this, as 10300 people were being let go world-wide and 2000 in France.

In January 2016, after 10 years at General Electric promoting French-American trade and defending industrial jobs in Europe, Gaymard was summoned before the French government to explain why 6,500 jobs were being lost against prior reassurance, and to confirm her immediate departure from the company.

Gaymard's style of management was cited as being liberal and progressive, notably her work for the LGBT community; as she supported the development of the diversity organisation, called GLBTA (Gay, Lesbian, Bisexual and Transgenre Alliance). She signed the charte d’engagement LGBT on behalf of General Electric.

In 2016 Gaymard co-founded the investment fund and philanthropic group Raise, with French businessman Gonzague de Blignières.

== Other activities ==
Parallel to her career, Gaymard was a lecturer in contract and public law, an auditor of the 53rd session of the Institut des hautes études de Défense nationale, and a founding member of the Jérôme Lejeune Foundation.

=== Corporate boards ===
- LVMH, Independent Member of the Board (since 2016)
- Bouygues, Member of the Board of Directors (since 2016)
- Danone, Independent Member of the Board (since 2016)
- Veolia, Independent Member of the Board (since 2015)

=== Non-profit organizations ===
- Trilateral Commission, Member
- American Chamber of Commerce in France (AmCham France), President (since 2014)
- French-American Foundation, former Member of the Board

== Personal life ==
Gaymard is the daughter of Professor Jérôme Lejeune, the doctor and geneticist who discovered the chromosomal link of Down syndrome, and Birthe Bringsted. Like her father, now venerated as a possible saint, Gaymard is Catholic.

She is married to Hervé Gaymard, a politician who served under President Jacques Chirac. The couple have nine children: Philothée, Bérénice, Thaïs, Marie-Lou, Amédée, Eulalie, Faustine, Jérôme-Aristide, Angélico.

== Publications ==
Works by Clara Lejeune:

- La Vie est un bonheur, Jérôme Lejeune, mon père (Life is a privilege, Jérôme Lejeune, my father), Paris, Critérion, 1997
- Histoires de femme autres simples bonheurs (The simple pleasures of other women), Paris, Lattès, 1999
- S'il suffisait d'aimer (If it was enough to love), Paris, Fayard, 2003

Works by Clara Gaymard and her sister Bérénice Bringsted (using the last name of her maternal grandfather):

- Faut qu'on parle! (We need to talk), Paris, Plon, 2016

== Distinctions ==
- Officer of the Ordre national du Mérite
- Knight of the Legion of Honour
- Commander of the Order of Merit of the Italian Republic (2 June 2005)
