= Marie Dauchy =

French politician of the National Rally (born 1987)

Marie Dauchy MEP
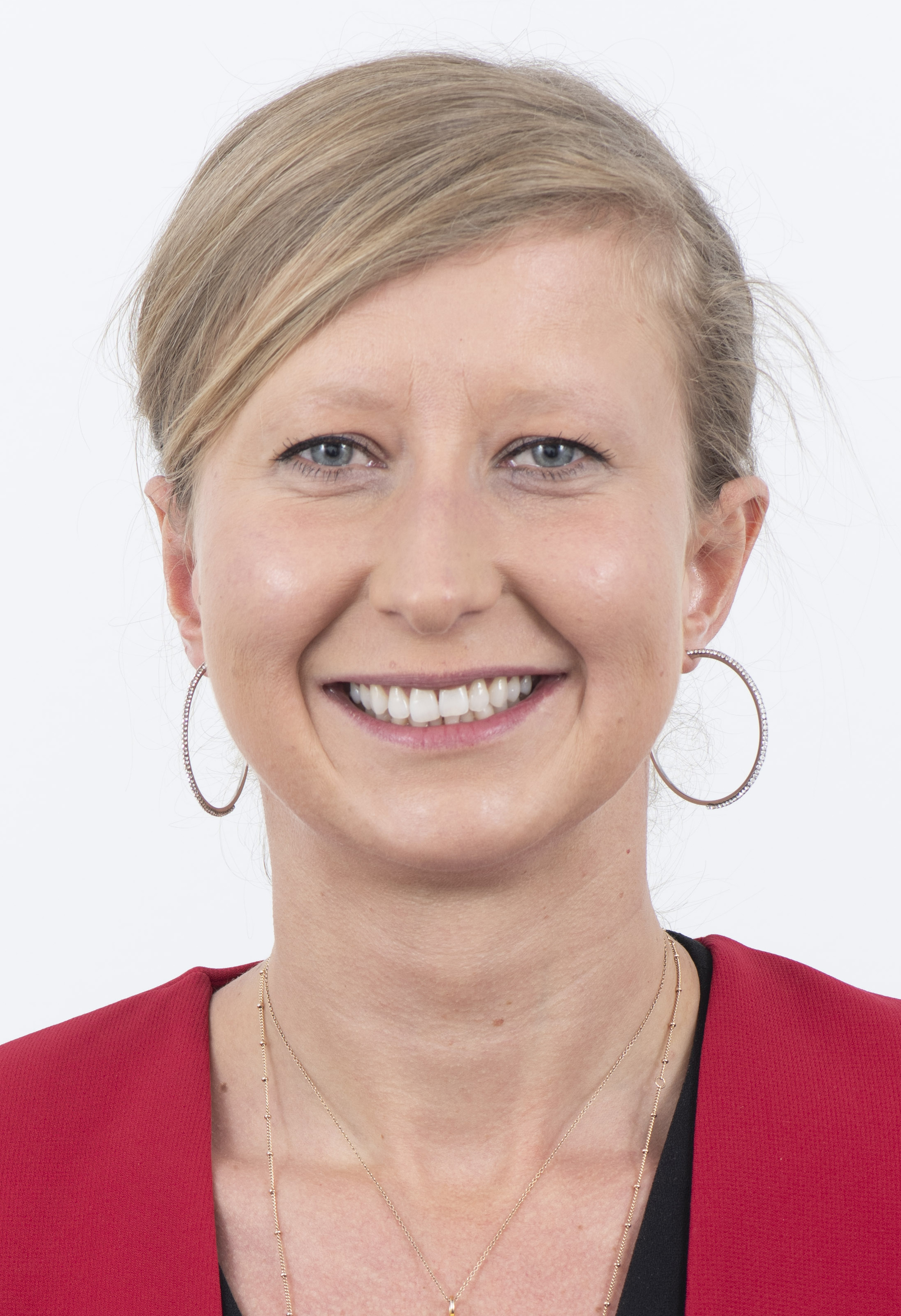

Member of the European Parliament for France
- Incumbent
- Assumed office 28 July 2022
- Preceded by: Hélène Laporte

Personal details
- Born: 5 February 1987 (age 39) Calais, France
- Party: National Rally

Marie Dauchy (born 5 February 1987) is a French politician of the National Rally party who has been a Member of the European Parliament since 2022. She was re-elected in 2024.
