= Vincent Rolland =

French politician(1970–present)

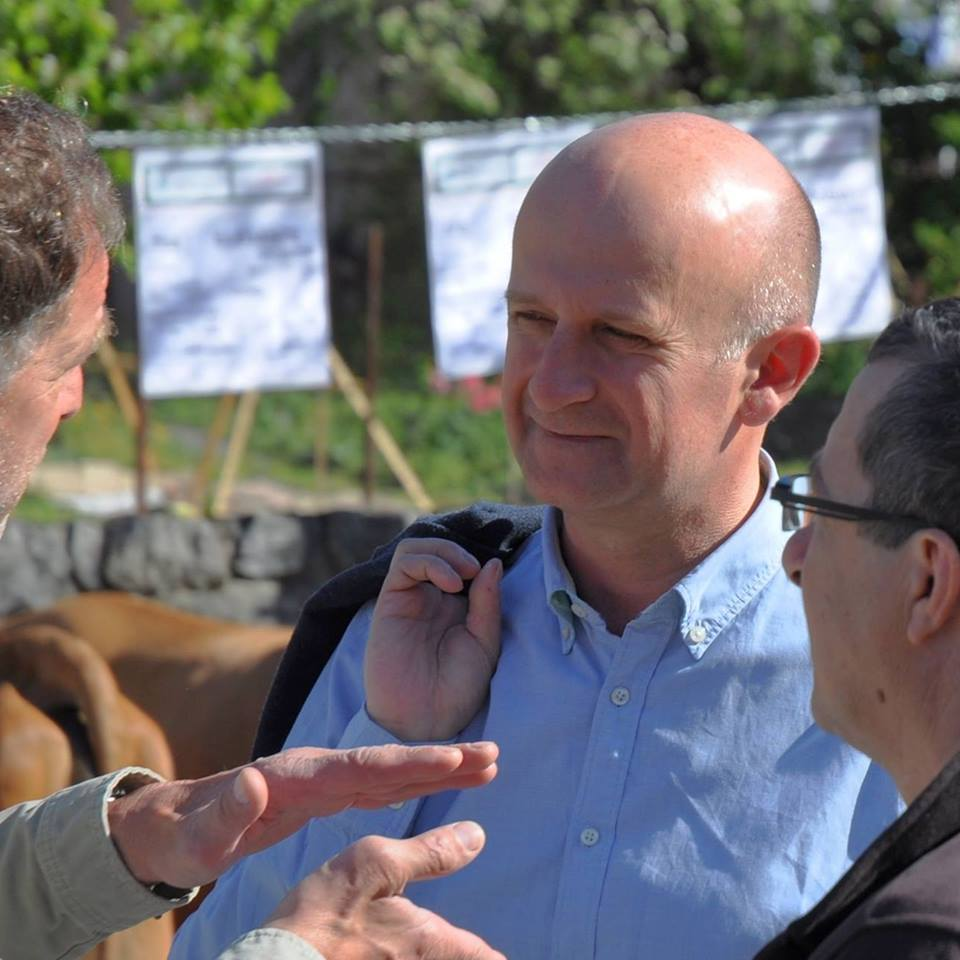

Member of the National Assembly for Savoie's 2nd constituency
- Incumbent
- Assumed office 21 June 2017
- Preceded by: Hervé Gaymard
- In office 19 July 2002 – 19 June 2007
- Preceded by: Hervé Gaymard
- Succeeded by: Hervé Gaymard

Personal details
- Born: 1 February 1970 (age 56) Moûtiers, France
- Party: Rally for the Republic (until 2002); Union for a Popular Movement (2002–2015); The Republicans (2015–present)
- Education: University of Lyon
- Website: Official website

Vincent Rolland (born 1 February 1970) is a French politician who has represented the 2nd constituency of the Savoie department in the National Assembly since 2017. A member of The Republicans (LR), he previously held the seat from 2002 to 2007 as Hervé Gaymard's substitute following the latter's appointment to the government.

== Biography ==
A ski instructor by occupation, Rolland has held a seat in the Departmental Council of Savoie (General Council of Savoie until 2015) since 1998. First elected for Bozel, he has been a departmental councillor for the canton of Moûtiers since 2015. Rolland held one of the departmental council's vice presidencies from 2004 to 2017 under the presidency of Hervé Gaymard.

Rolland was a municipal councillor of Pralognan-la-Vanoise from 1995 to 1997, when he became Deputy Mayor of Pralognan-la-Vanoise, a position he held until 2008. He was a municipal councillor of Albertville from 2008 to 2017.

He served as the member of the National Assembly for the 2nd constituency of Savoie from 2002 to 2007, before regaining the seat in 2017 following Gaymard's retirement from parliamentary politics. Ahead of the 2022 presidential election, Rolland publicly declared his support for Michel Barnier as The Republicans' candidate.
