= Émilie Bonnivard =

French politician (born 1980)

Member of the National Assembly for Savoie's 3rd constituency
- Incumbent
- Assumed office 21 June 2017
- Preceded by: Béatrice Santais

Member of the Regional Council of Auvergne-Rhône-Alpes
- Incumbent
- Assumed office 4 January 2016

Personal details
- Born: 2 August 1980 (age 46) Chambéry, France
- Party: Union for a Popular Movement (until 2015); The Republicans (2015–present)
- Education: Savoy Mont Blanc University; Paris Nanterre University

Émilie Bonnivard (French pronunciation: [emili bɔnivaʁ]; born 2 August 1980) is a French politician who has represented the 3rd constituency of the Savoie department in the National Assembly since 2017. A member of The Republicans (LR), she has also been a member of the Regional Council of Auvergne-Rhône-Alpes since 2016.

A native of Chambéry, Bonnivard served as Deputy Mayor of Montaimont from 2014 to 2017. She held one of the vice presidencies of the Regional Council of Auvergne-Rhône-Alpes from 2016 until 2017 under the presidency of Laurent Wauquiez, where she was tasked with agriculture and rurality.

Bonnivard endorsed Christian Jacob as the party’s chairman in the run-up to the Republicans’ 2019 convention.

Ahead of the 2022 presidential election, Bonnivard publicly declared her support for Michel Barnier as The Republicans' candidate. In the run-up to the Republicans' 2022 convention, she endorsed Éric Ciotti as the party's chairman.
