= Marina Ferrari =

French politician (born 1973)

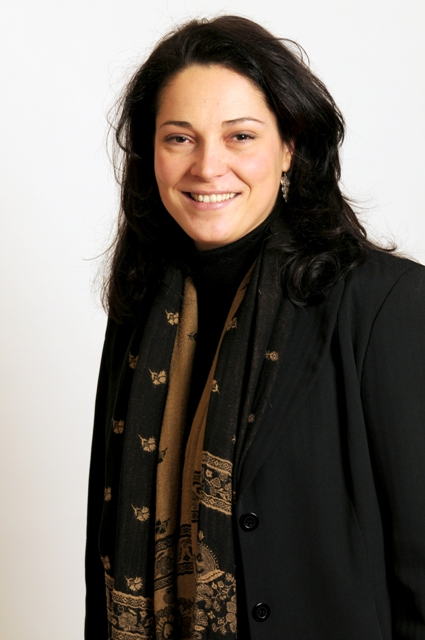

Minister of Sports, Youth and Community Life
- Incumbent
- Assumed office 5 October 2025
- Prime Minister: Sébastien Lecornu
- Preceded by: Marie Barsacq

Member of the National Assembly for Savoie's 1st constituency
- In office 24 January 2025 – 12 November 2025
- Preceded by: Didier Padey
- In office 22 June 2022 – 8 March 2024
- Preceded by: Typhanie Degois
- Succeeded by: Didier Padey

Delegated Minister for Tourism Economy
- In office 21 September 2024 – 23 December 2024
- Prime Minister: Michel Barnier
- Preceded by: Olivia Grégoire
- Succeeded by: Nathalie Delattre

Secretary of State for Digital Affairs
- In office 8 February 2024 – 21 September 2024
- Prime Minister: Gabriel Attal
- Preceded by: Jean-Noël Barrot
- Succeeded by: Clara Chappaz

Personal details
- Born: 10 October 1973 (age 53) Aix-les-Bains, Savoie, France
- Party: MoDem
- Other political affiliations: Ensemble Citoyens
- Education: Savoy Mont Blanc University, Paris Descartes University

Marina Ferrari (French: [maʁina fɛʁaʁi]; born 10 October 1973) is a French politician of the Democratic Movement (MoDem) who has served as the Minister of Sports, Youth and Community Life in the Lecornu government since 2025. She has served as a Member of Parliament for Savoie's 1st constituency from 2022 to 2024 and in 2025.

Ferrari served as the Secretary of State for Digital Affairs in the government of Prime Minister Gabriel Attal, and then Delegated Minister for Tourism Economy in the government of Michel Barnier in 2024.

== Early life ==
Ferrari was born in Aix-les-Bains to a French mother and Italian father. She is also of Austrian descent.

== Political career ==
In parliament, Ferrari served on the Finance Committee from 2022 to 2023. In addition to her committee assignment, she was part of the French-Italian Parliamentary Friendship Group.

Marina Ferrari was appointed Minister of Sports, Youth and Associative Life on 5 October 2025 in the first Lecornu government. However, her tenure—along with that of the entire Lecornu cabinet—ended very shortly thereafter when the government resigned on 6 October 2025, making her effectively a minister in title only. She was reappointed for Minister of Sports in the second Lecornu government.

The French government called for emergency talks among European football authorities amid the FIFA Forward Enterprise proposal, with Ferrari warning that the plan represented a major shift in football governance and stating that "football is not for sale".

== See also ==
- List of deputies of the 16th National Assembly of France
