= Hervé Gaymard =

French politician (born 1960)

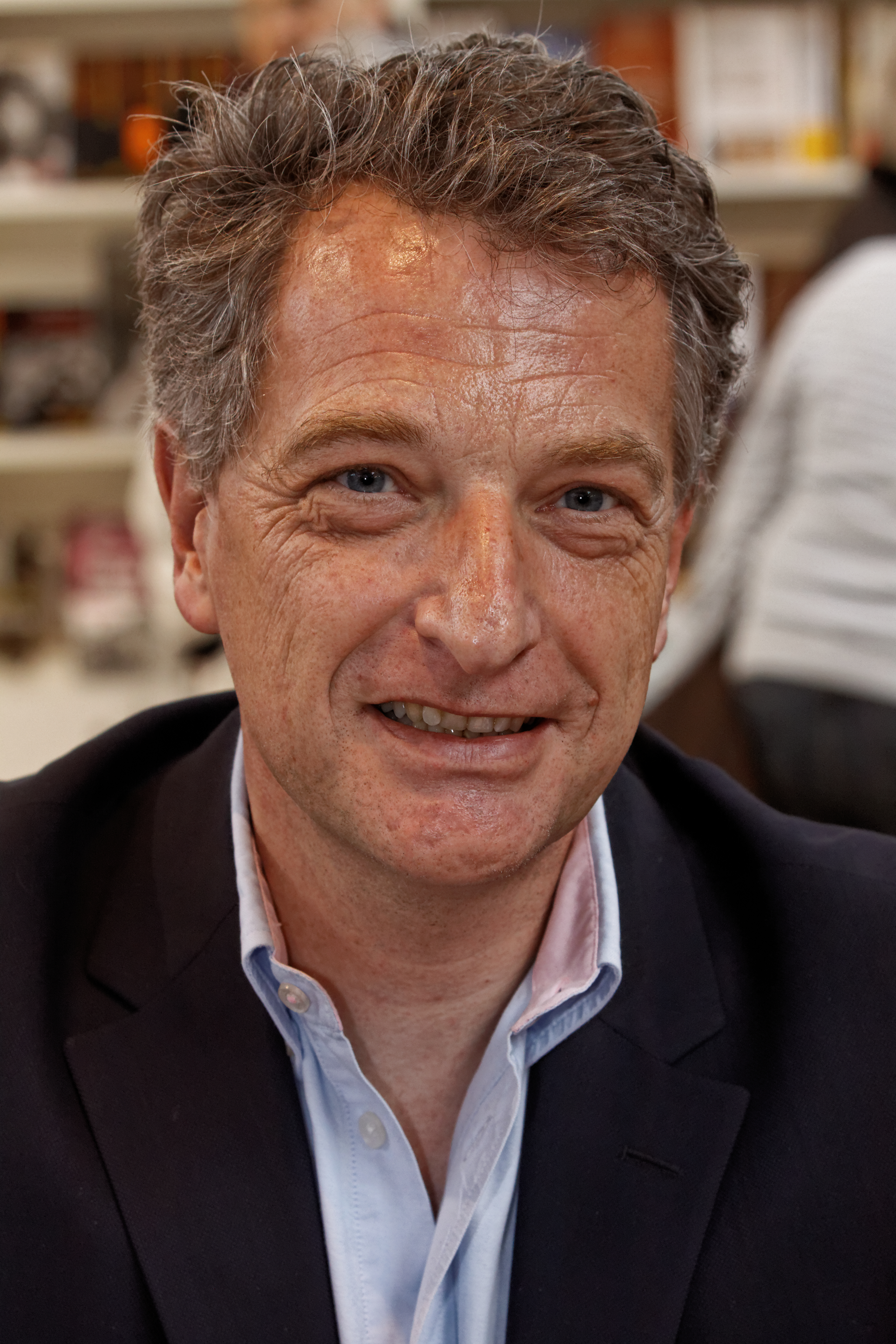

Member of the National Assembly for Savoie's 2nd constituency
- In office 2007–2017
- Preceded by: Vincent Rolland
- Succeeded by: Vincent Rolland

Minister of Economy, Finance and Industry
- In office 30 November 2004 – 25 February 2005
- President: Jacques Chirac
- Prime Minister: Jean-Pierre Raffarin
- Preceded by: Nicolas Sarkozy
- Succeeded by: Thierry Breton

Minister of Agriculture, of Food, Fisheries and Rural Affairs
- In office 7 May 2002 – 29 November 2004
- President: Jacques Chirac
- Prime Minister: Jean-Pierre Raffarin
- Preceded by: François Patriat
- Succeeded by: Dominique Bussereau

Personal details
- Born: 31 May 1960 (age 66) Bourg-Saint-Maurice, France
- Party: The Republicans
- Spouse: Clara Gaymard (m. 1986)
- Children: 9
- Education: Sciences Po, ÉNA

Hervé Gaymard (born 31 May 1960) is a French politician and a member of The Republicans conservative party. He served as the country's Minister of Finance from 30 November 2004 until his resignation on 25 February 2005.

Gaymard attended Sciences Po and then at the École nationale d'administration, graduating from the latter in 1986. After that he worked as a civil servant in a number of finance-related positions.

He was elected as a local councillor in the Savoie commune of Moûtiers in 1994. He later served on the departmental council of Savoie, and in 1999, became its president. He was appointed to the finance ministry in November 2004, and was forced to resign barely 12 weeks later, on Friday, 25 February 2005.

He is married to Clara Gaymard, CEO of General Electric in France (and VP of GE International), the daughter of geneticist and anti-abortion activist Jérôme Lejeune. A Catholic, he is the father of nine children: Philothée, Bérénice, Thaïs, Marie-Lou, Amédée, Eulalie, Faustine, Jérôme-Aristide, Angélico.

== Scandal ==
Gaymards resigned as Minister of Finances after the satirical and investigative newspaper Le Canard enchaîné disclosed on 16 February 2005 that the government was funding an exclusive apartment for Gaymard and his family (his wife and 8 of his children). The duplex apartment, located in the exclusive "Golden Triangle" neighbourhood off Paris' Champs-Élysées, reportedly had an area of 600 m² (6,460 sq ft) and cost the state a monthly rental of €14,000. Aside from the luxuriously high rent, the state was also funding $3,300 a month for maintenance and three parking spaces, $42,000 to renovate the apartment and the parking area, and $16,000 in real estate fees.

== Resignation ==
While Gaymard's actions were not illegal, the exposure of Gaymard's accepting lavish, state-funded perks, followed by his attempts to mislead in interviews, was bad news for the government at a time when the French public was asked to accept more economic sacrifices while reeling from a staggering unemployment rate that reached 10% in January, the highest level in over five years. Gaymard himself had said that the French should become "detoxified" of public spending. Curbing spending has been at the forefront of Gaymard's office, giving hope to voters that the economy there would soon improve. And, as it was part of his responsibilities to regulate the housing market, he could not be unaware of the difficulties facing families seeking affordable accommodations.

He resigned less than 5 hours before he was to give a televised interview defending his actions. In his issued statement, he said, "I am aware that I committed blunders and, above all, a serious error of judgement…"

Following this scandal, Prime Minister Jean-Pierre Raffarin tightened up the rules for public officials using state-funded apartments. However, the Canard soon revealed that Budget Minister Jean-François Copé also enjoyed an expensive apartment paid for by the state while he owned an apartment in Paris.

There has been some controversy regarding how the Canard and Libération had obtained such information. At one point, it was suggested that they were orchestrated by Nicolas Sarkozy, a political rival of Gaymard from the same party.

On 26 August 2005, Hervé Gaymard was reintegrated into the civil service corps of the administrateurs civils, with a hors-classe rank, and assigned to the Ministry of Finances (direction of the budget). (ministerial decision in Journal Officiel, 13 September 2005; Le Monde, 20 September 2005) after refunding the state the €58,894 that the refurbishment of his apartment had cost. Hervé Gaymard has previously announced that he considered working in the private sector. It is unknown, at this point, whether he considers going back to politics in the future.

== Political career ==
=== Government positions ===
- Minister of Economy, Finance and Industry : 2004–2005 (Resignation, involved in a court case in 2005).
- Minister of Agriculture, of Food, Fisheries and Rural Affairs : 2002–2004.
- Secretary of State for Health and Social Security : November 1995 – 1997.
- Secretary of State for Finance : May–November 1995.

=== Electoral positions ===
==== National Assembly of France ====
Member of the National Assembly of France for Savoie (2nd constituency) : 1993–1995 (Became secretary of State in 1995) / 1997–2002 (Became minister in 2002) / And since 2007. Elected in 1993, reelected in 1997, 2002, 2007 and 2012.

==== Regional Council ====
- Regional councillor of Rhône-Alpes : 2004–2007 (Resignation).

==== General Council ====
- President of the General Council of Savoie : 1999–2002 (Resignation) / Since 2008. Reelected in 2001, 2008, 2011, 2015.
- Vice-president of the General Council of Savoie : 2002–2008. Reelected in 2004.
- General councillor of Savoie : Since 1994. Reelected in 2001, 2008, and 2015.

== Other activities ==
- Institut français des relations internationales (Ifri), Member of the Board of Directors

Political offices
Preceded by François Patriat	Minister of Agriculture; 2002–2004	Succeeded by Dominique Bussereau
Preceded by Nicolas Sarkozy	Minister of the Economy, Finance and Industry; 2004–2005	Succeeded by Thierry Breton
