= Savoie =

French department in Auvergne-Rhône-Alpes

Savoie Savouè (Arpitan) Savoia (Italian) Savòia (Occitan)
- Department of France
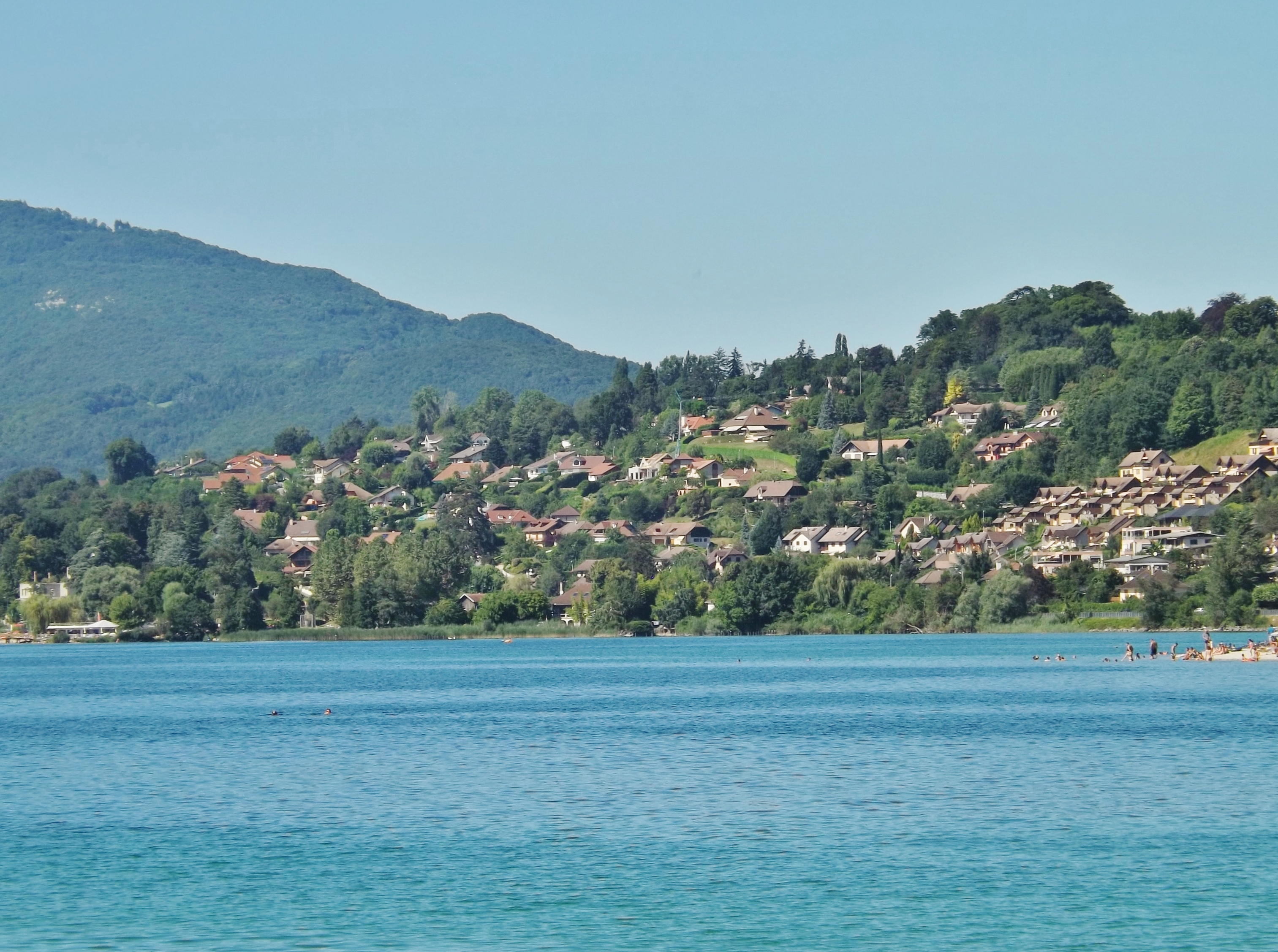
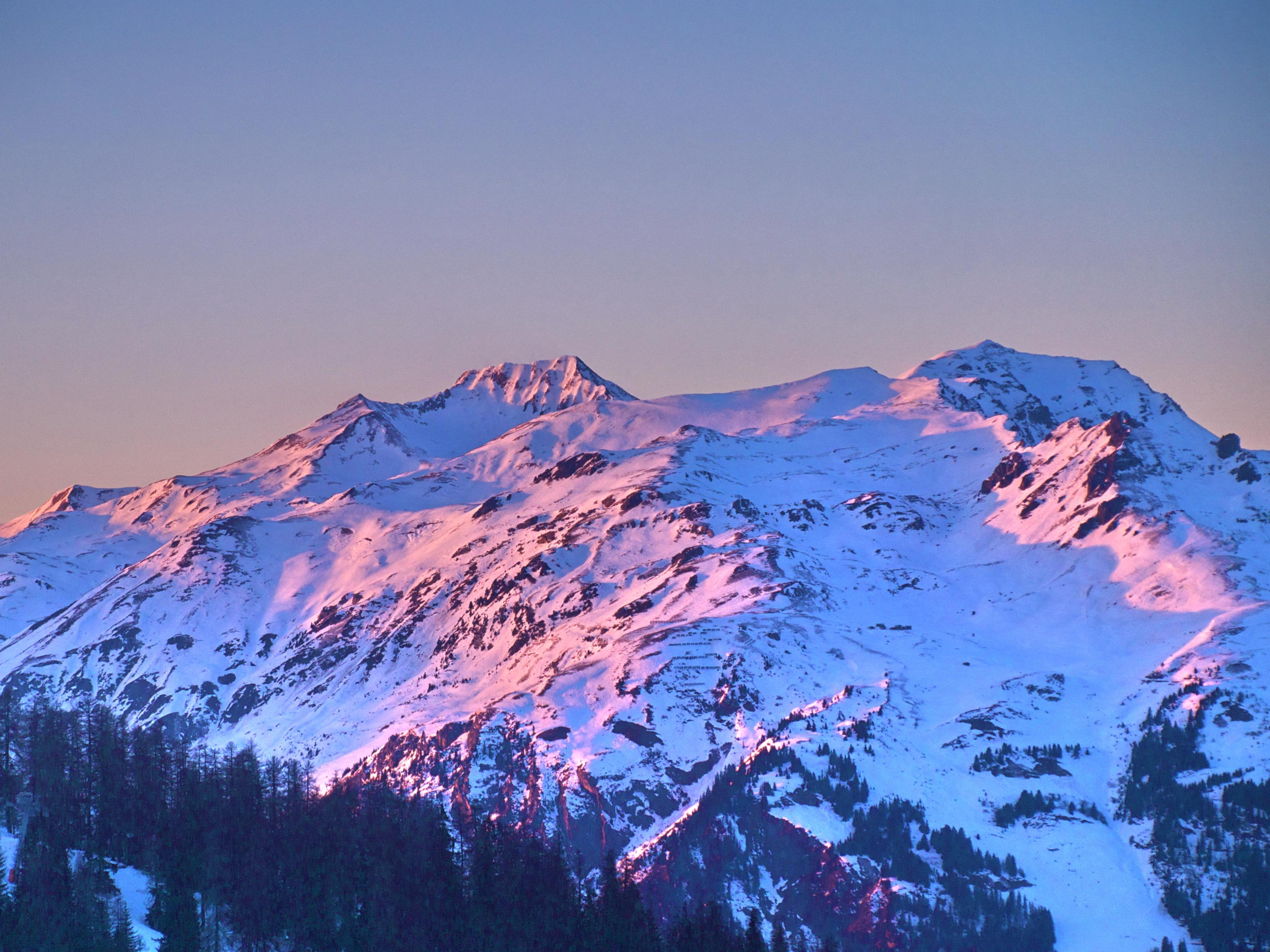
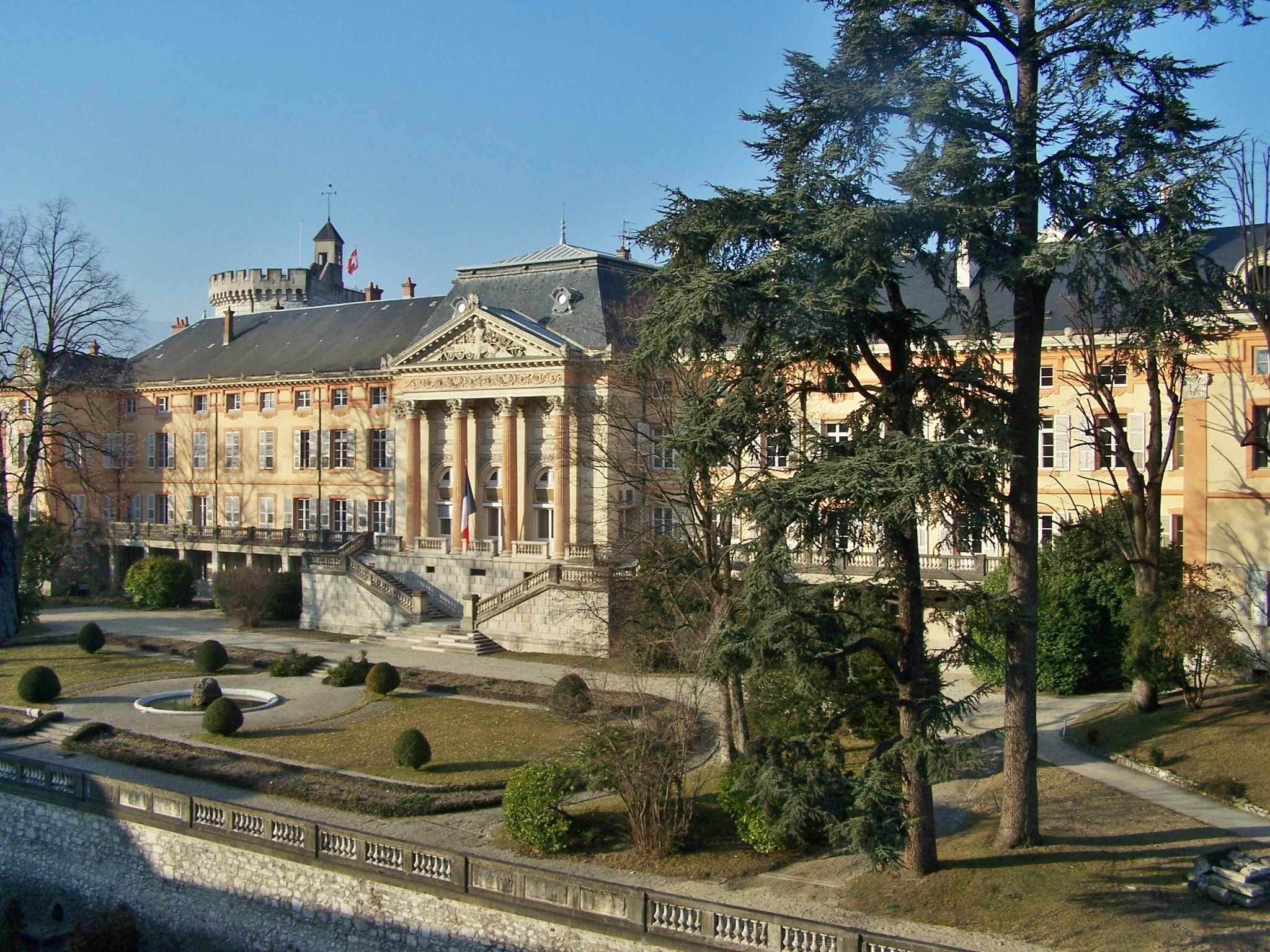
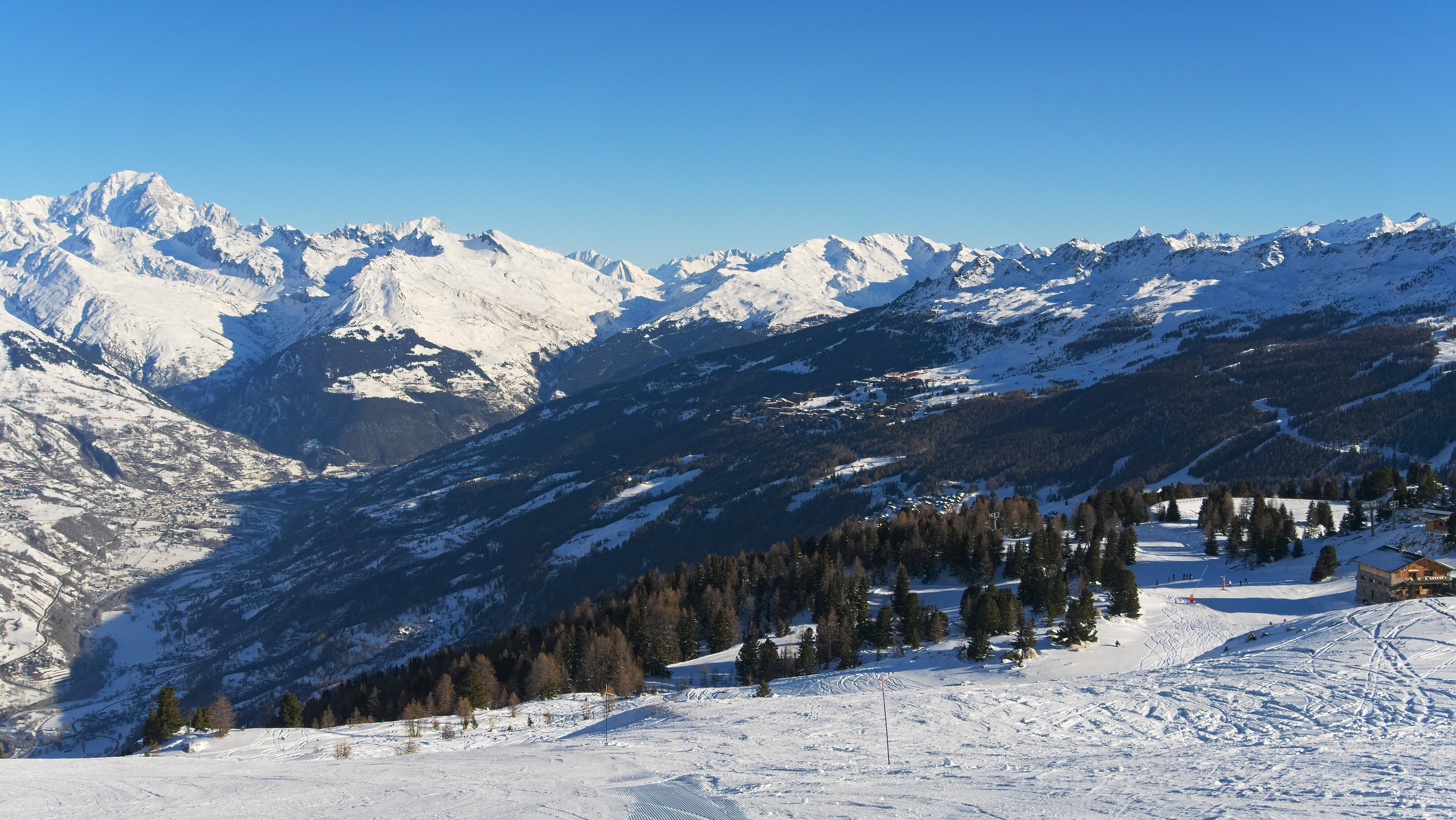
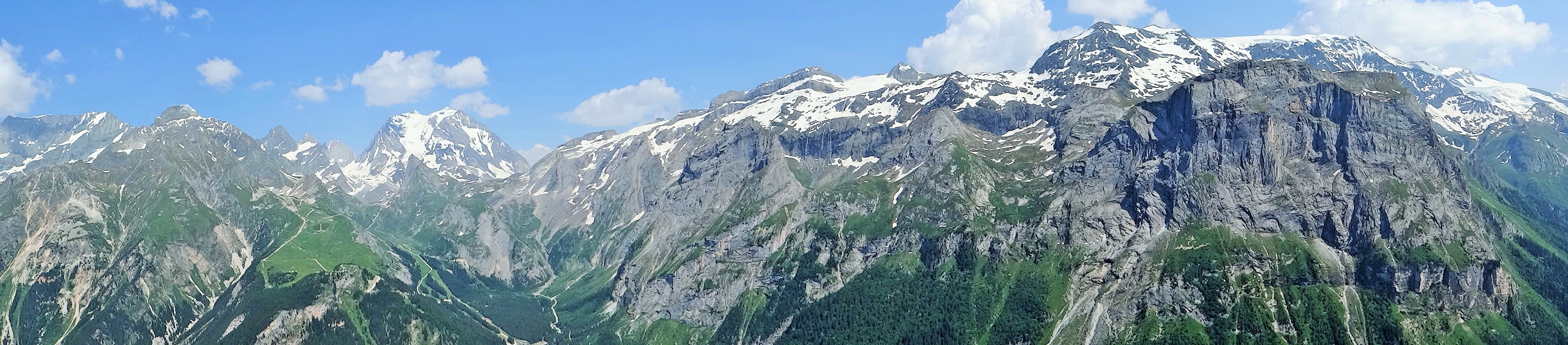
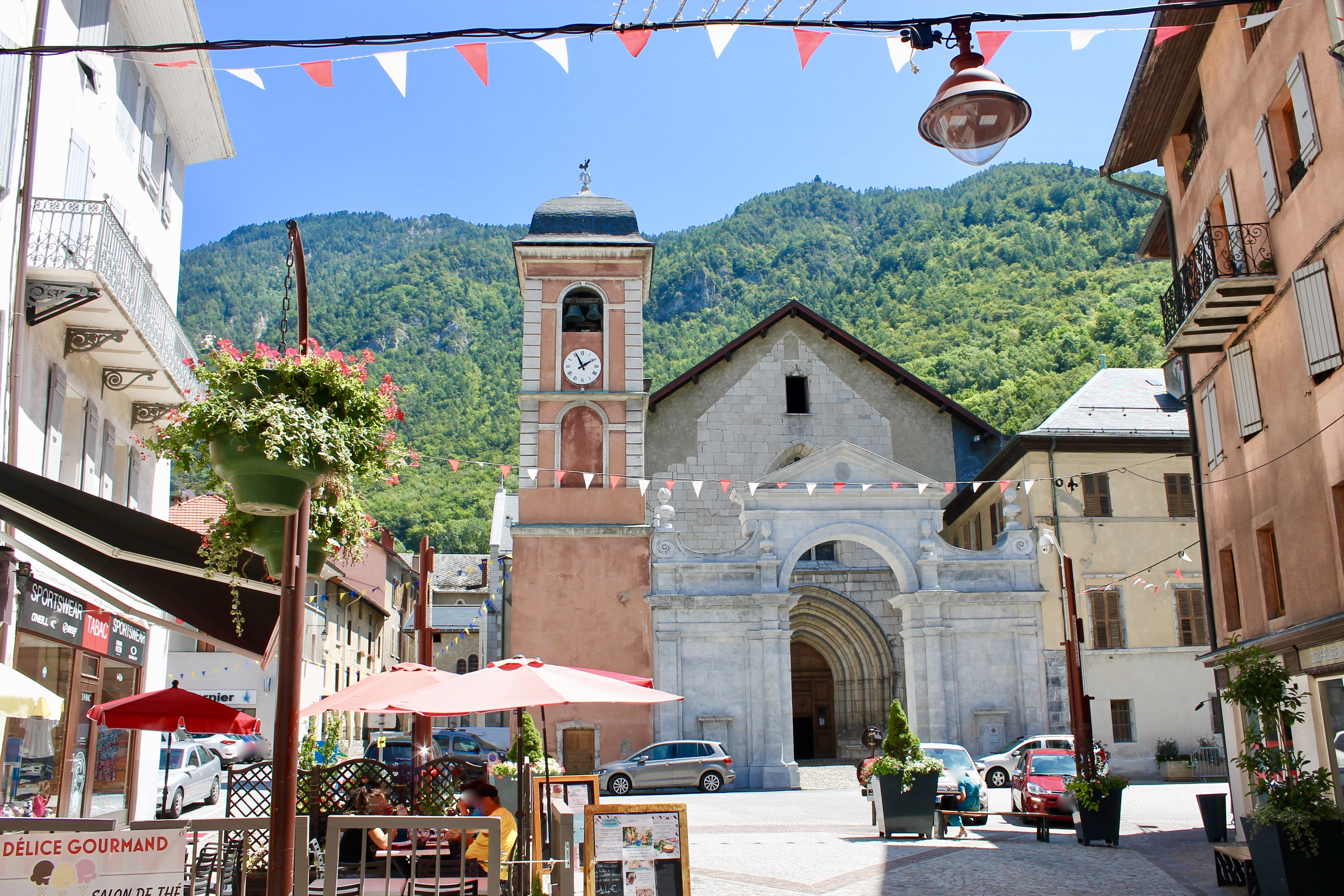
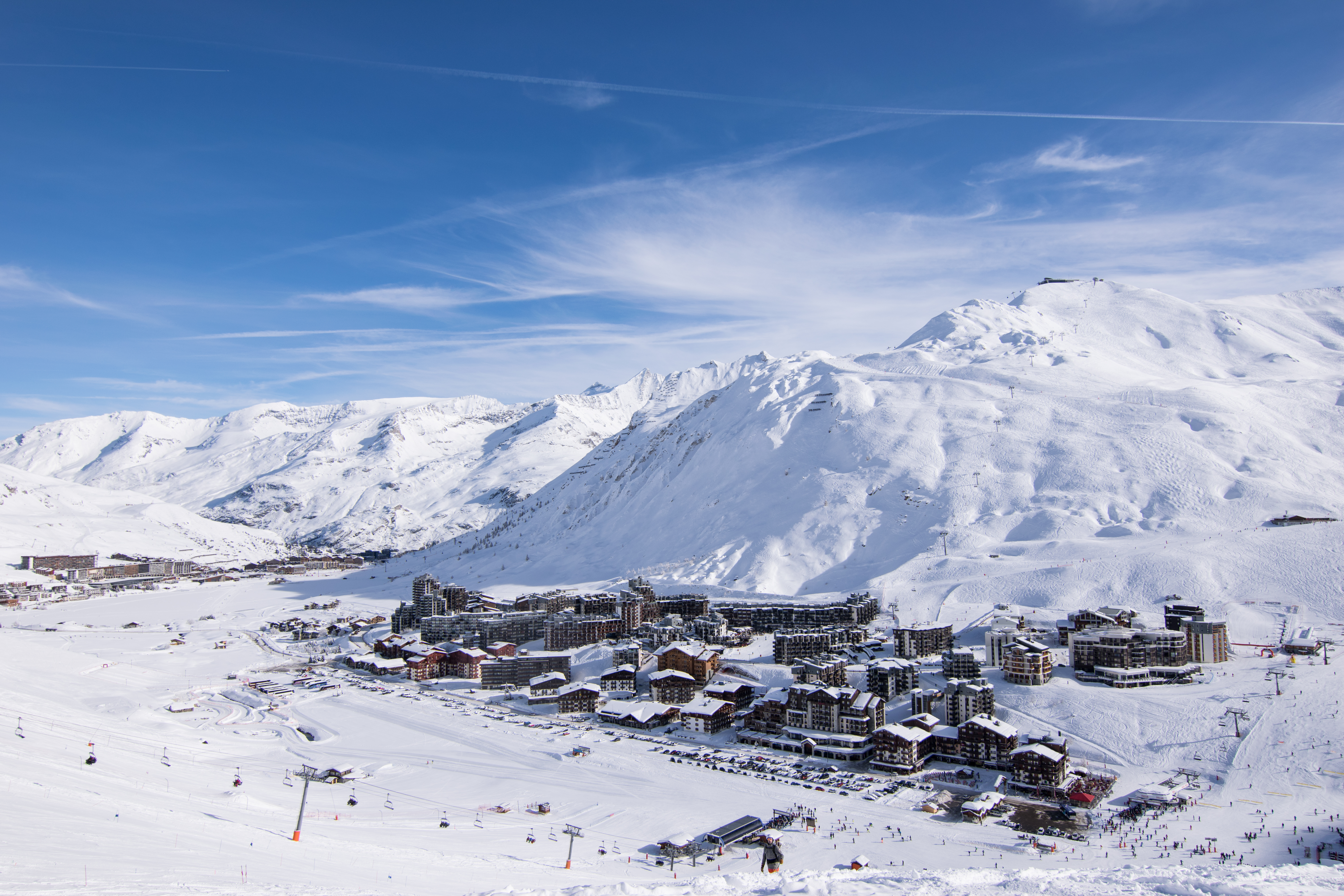
- From top down: Tresserve on the Lac du Bourget, La Plagne, prefecture building in Chambéry, Les Arcs ski station, Vanoise National Park, Moûtiers Cathedral and Tignes

- Logo

- Location of Savoie in France
- Coordinates: 45°35′N 6°20′E
- Country: France
- Region: Auvergne-Rhône-Alpes
- Prefecture: Chambéry
- Subprefectures: Albertville; Saint-Jean-de-Maurienne

Government
  - President of the Departmental Council: Hervé Gaymard (LR)

Area^{1}
  - Total: 6,028 km^{2} (2,327 sq mi)
- Elevation: 1,595 m (5,233 ft)
- Highest elevation: 3,855 m (12,648 ft)
- Lowest elevation: 208 m (682 ft)

Population (2023)
  - Total: 448,226
  - Rank: 57th
  - Density: 74.36/km^{2} (192.6/sq mi)
- Time zone: UTC+1 (CET)
  - Summer (DST): UTC+2 (CEST)
- Department number: 73
- Arrondissements: 3
- Cantons: 19
- Communes: 273
- ^1 French Land Register data, which exclude estuaries and lakes, ponds and glaciers larger than 1 km^{2}

Savoie (French pronunciation: [savwa]; Arpitan: Savouè or Savouè-d'Avâl, lit. 'Lower Savoy'; Italian: Savoia; Occitan: Savòia; English: Savoy, /səˈvɔɪ/) is a department in the region of Auvergne-Rhône-Alpes, Southeastern France. Located in the French Alps, its prefecture is Chambéry. In 2023, Savoie had a population of 448,226.

Together with Haute-Savoie, it is one of the two departments of the historical region of Savoy; the Duchy of Savoy was annexed by France in 1860, following the signing of the Treaty of Turin. The area is known for its numerous ski resorts and contribution to French cuisine, with culinary specialities such as fondue savoyarde, tartiflette, génépi, as well as various sorts of saucisson.

== History ==
It is widely accepted that Savoie takes its name from the Latin Sapaudia or Sabaudia, meaning land covered in fir trees. Savoie was long part of the states of Savoy; though beginning in the 16th century, it was occupied by France several times. It was integrated into the Mont-Blanc department from 1792 to 1815 (and partially into the Léman department from 1798 to 1814). The province was annexed by France in 1860. The former Duchy of Savoy became the two departments of Savoie and Haute-Savoie.

Moûtiers, capital of the former province of Tarentaise Valley (French: Vallée de la Tarentaise), ceased to be a subprefecture following a law that took effect on 10 September 1926.

Savoie hosted the 1992 Winter Olympics, based in Albertville with ski events at Tarentaise and Beaufortain. The coat of arms for Savoie was used as a pattern for the flames in the official emblem of the games.

The other main alpine valley is the Maurienne, connected to the Tarentaise valley by two passes, the col de la Madeleine and the highest pass in Europe, the col de l'Iseran. The Maurienne valley was through the col du Mont Cenis, the major commercial route between France and Italy. It is one of the longest intra-alpine valleys in the Alps.

== Geography ==
Savoie is part of the Auvergne-Rhône-Alpes region established on 1 January 2016. It was previously part of Rhône-Alpes. It borders the departments of Haute-Savoie, Ain, Isère, and Hautes-Alpes, as well as Italy's Aosta Valley and Metropolitan City of Turin.

Much of Savoie is covered by mountains:

- Mont Blanc Massif
- Belledonne Massif
- Lauzière Massif
- Aiguilles d'Arves Massif
- Massif des Cerces
- Aravis Range
- Mont Cenis Massif
- Bauges Massif
- Chartreuse Massif
- Vanoise Massif
- Beaufortain Massif

The department is crossed by the Isère river, which has its source in the Iseran pass. Its two main lakes are Lac du Bourget (the largest and deepest lake entirely in France) and Lac d'Aiguebelette, one of the least polluted in France due to a 1976 law forbidding any use of motorboats on the lake.

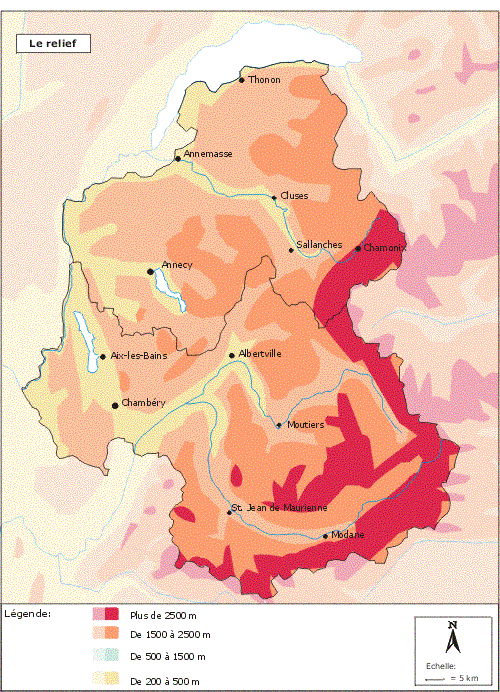
Relief map of Savoy

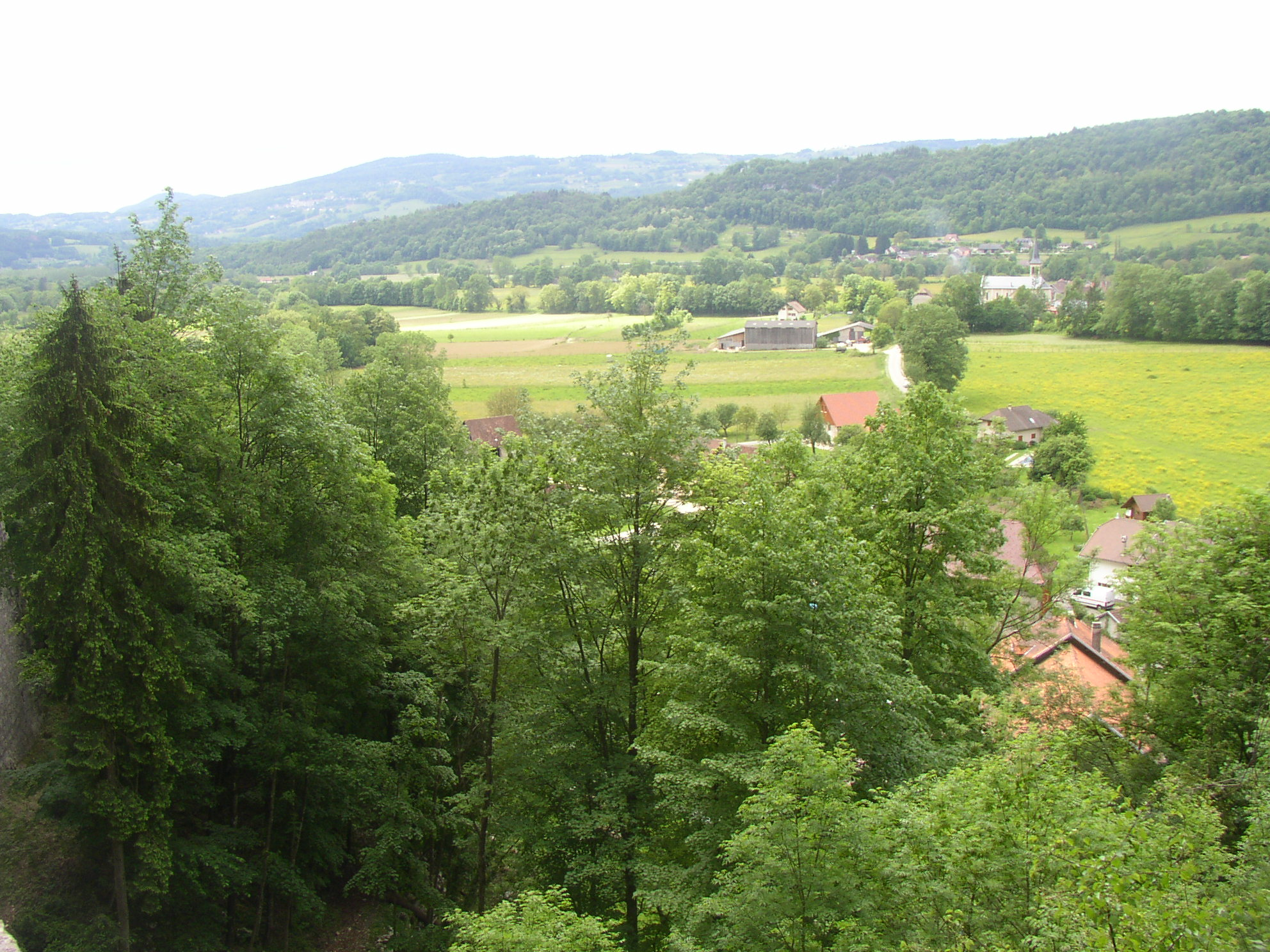
Savoie lowlands

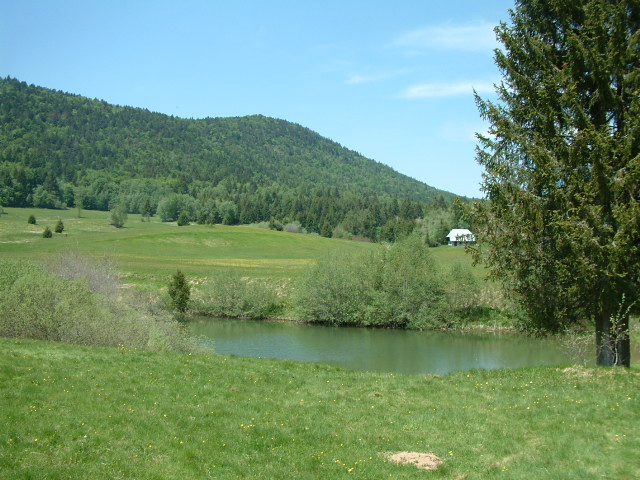
Mid elevation: Mariet plateau in the Bauges Massif

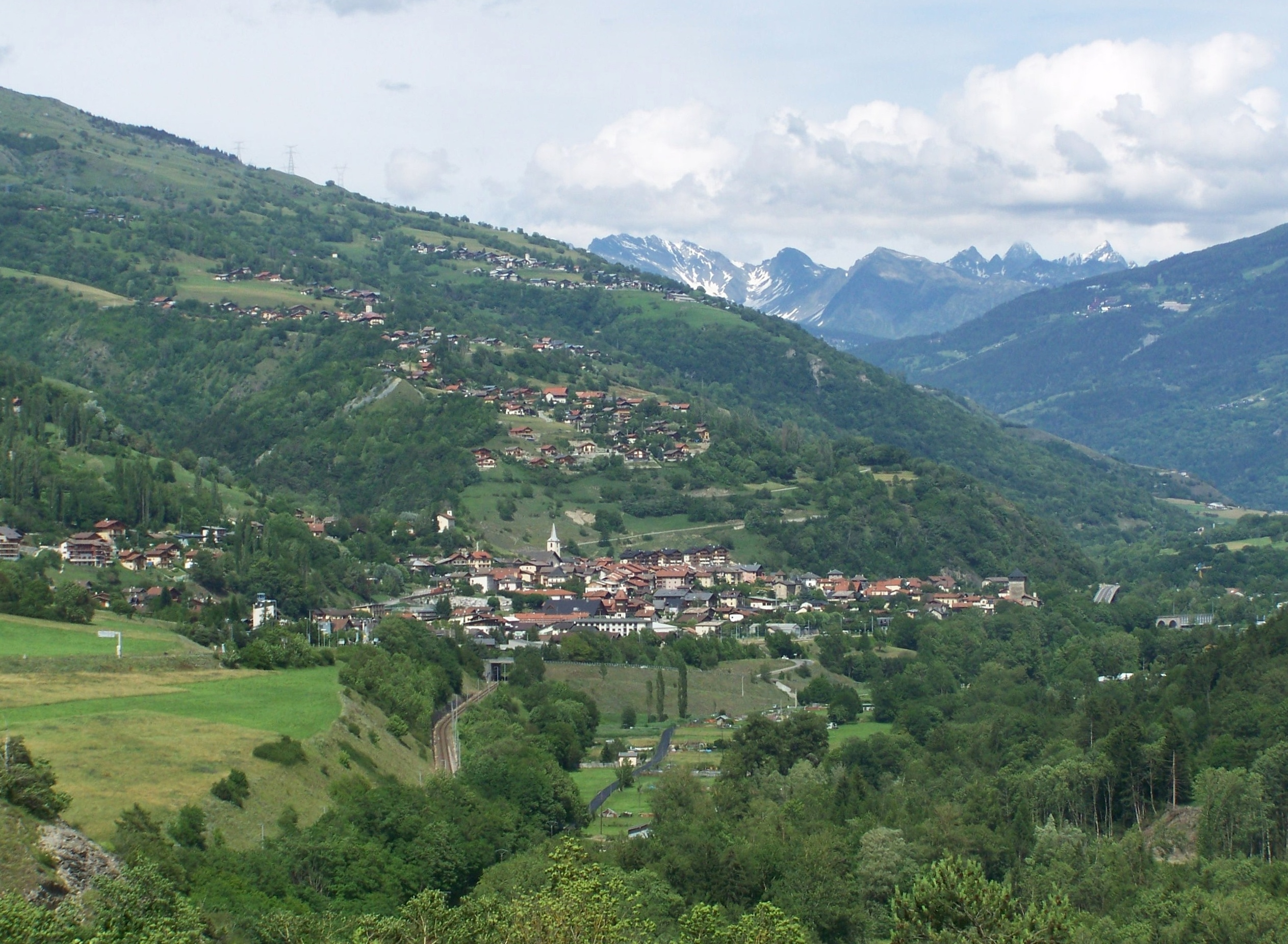
High elevation: the village of Aime

=== Climate ===
Most of the department features an alpine climate or a subalpine climate. At lower altitudes and in the valleys, the climate is humid continental (Köppen: Dfb) or even oceanic in the frontcountry and Lac du Bourget area (Köppen: Cfb), using the 0 °C (32 °F) isotherm.

== Economy ==
According to the Chambéry chamber of commerce, close to 50% of the department's wealth comes from tourism. Each year, Savoie hosts over 30 million visitor-nights of tourists. Savoie also profits from its natural resources with particular strengths in ore processing and hydroelectric power.

Savoie had an exceptionally high export/import ratio of 214% in 2005. Its exports rose to €1.768 billion and €825 million in imports. Its leading exports were steel, aluminum, and electric and electronic components.

=== Agriculture ===
Savoie is famous for its cows, which produce numerous cheeses, some of them are:

- Beaufort
- Savoie gruyère
- Reblochon
- Abbaye de Tamié
- Tome des Bauges
- Tomme de Savoie

Numerous wine grapes are also grown in Savoie. The most famous wines are made of Gamay, Pinot noir and Mondeuse grapes. Fruit production is the third largest component of agriculture in Savoie.

Apples and pears are also produced in the region and are well known for their qualities.

== Demographics ==
Historical population

Year	Pop.	±% p.a.
1861	275,039	—
1872	267,958	−0.24%
1881	266,438	−0.06%
1891	263,297	−0.12%
1901	254,781	−0.33%
1911	247,890	−0.27%
1921	225,034	−0.96%
1931	235,544	+0.46%
1936	239,115	+0.30%
1946	235,965	−0.13%
1954	252,192	+0.83%

Year	Pop.	±% p.a.
1962	266,678	+0.70%
1968	288,921	+1.34%
1975	305,118	+0.78%
1982	323,675	+0.85%
1990	348,261	+0.92%
1999	373,258	+0.77%
2007	405,535	+1.04%
2012	421,105	+0.76%
2017	431,174	+0.47%
2023	448,226	+0.65%

Residents of Savoie are known as Savoyards in French, though they can also be called Savoisiens (the historical name) or Savoyens.

=== Principal towns ===
The most populous commune is Chambéry, the prefecture. As of 2023, there are 8 communes with more than 7,000 inhabitants:

Commune	Population (2023)
Chambéry†	59,964
Aix-les-Bains†	32,406
Albertville	19,978
La Motte-Servolex†	12,067
La Ravoire†	9,332
Saint-Jean-de-Maurienne	7,524
Bourg-Saint-Maurice	7,270
Ugine	7,154
† part of Chambéry agglomeration

The "average" (see arithmetic mean) population density is not a good indicator: the valleys tend to be much more densely populated, whereas the mountains tend to be near-completely uninhabited.

=== Religion ===
The Catholic Church in Savoie is divided into three dioceses: Chambéry, Maurienne, and Tarentaise. Together, they form an archdiocese, in which the bishop of Chambéry is the archbishop.

== Politics ==
=== Departmental Council of Savoie ===
The Departmental Council of Savoie has 38 seats. 30 councillors are part of the J'aime la Savoie ("I love Savoie") right-wing group; 8 councillors are part of the Savoie pour Tous ("Savoie for All") left-wing group. Hervé Gaymard (The Republicans) has been President of the Departmental Council since 2008. Thierry Repentin (Socialist Party) has been Opposition Leader since 1998.

=== Members of the National Assembly ===
Constituency	Member	Party
Savoie's 1st constituency	Marina Ferrari	MoDem
Savoie's 2nd constituency	Vincent Rolland	The Republicans
Savoie's 3rd constituency	Émilie Bonnivard	The Republicans
Savoie's 4th constituency	Jean-François Coulomme	La France Insoumise

=== Senators ===
Savoie is represented by two Senators in Parliament. Jean-Pierre Vial and Martine Berthet have served since 1995 and 2017 respectively. Both are members of The Republicans (LR).

== Tourism ==
Tourism, which is quite important to Savoie, began to develop towards the end of the 19th century, mostly summer oriented. The increase in the popularity of skiing in the 20th century made Savoie home to the largest number of ski hills in France, including many famous ones:

- Val-d'Isère
- Tignes
- Les Arcs
- La Plagne
- Courchevel
- Méribel
- Valmorel
- Les Menuires
- Val Thorens
- Les Saisies
- Savoie Grand Revard
- Bramans
- Bessans
- Valloire

Hydrotherapy, practised in the region since antiquity, is also quite developed. There are four locations that are still active:

- Aix-les-Bains
- Challes-les-Eaux
- Brides-les-Bains
- La Léchère
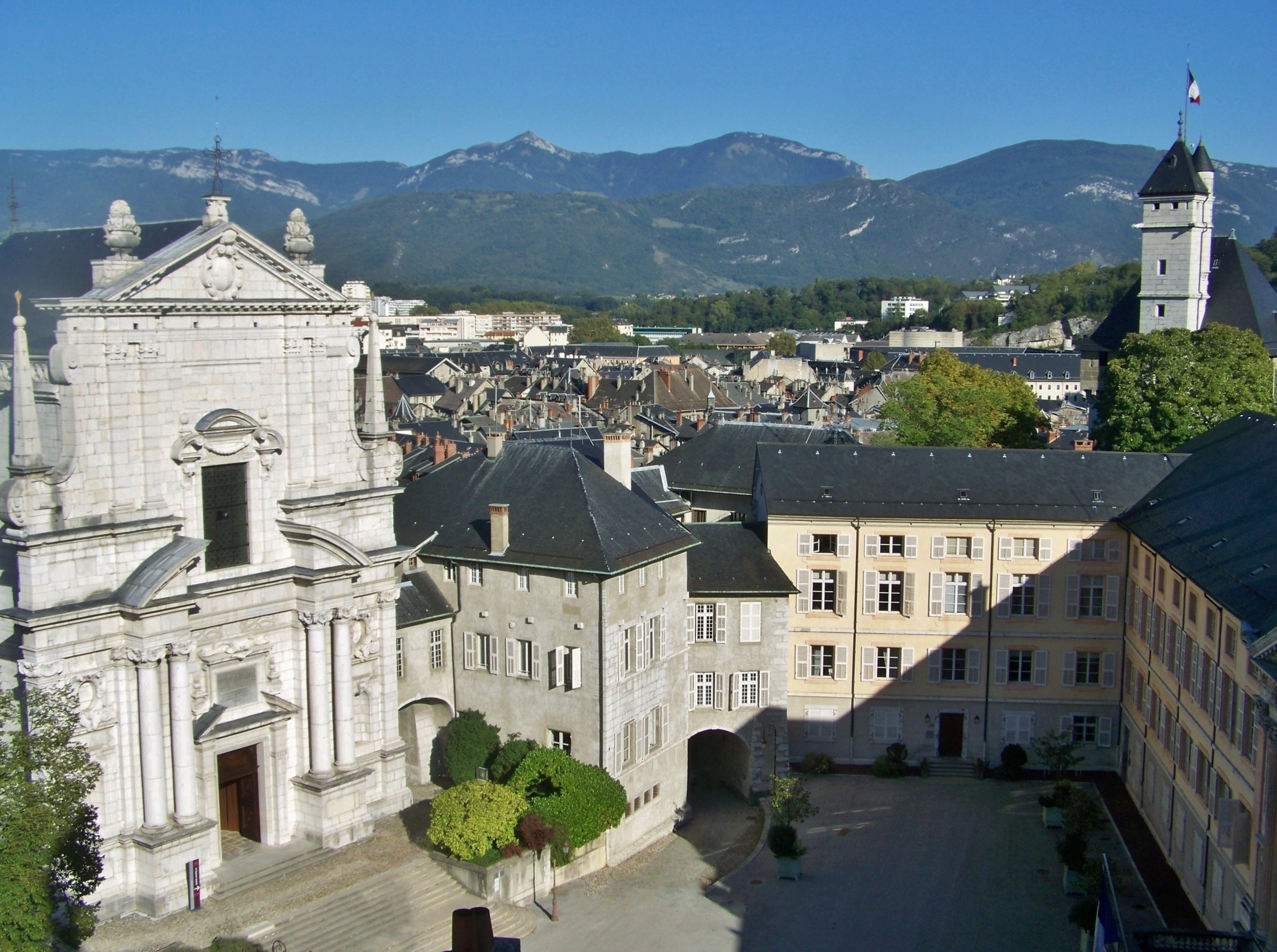
Chambéry

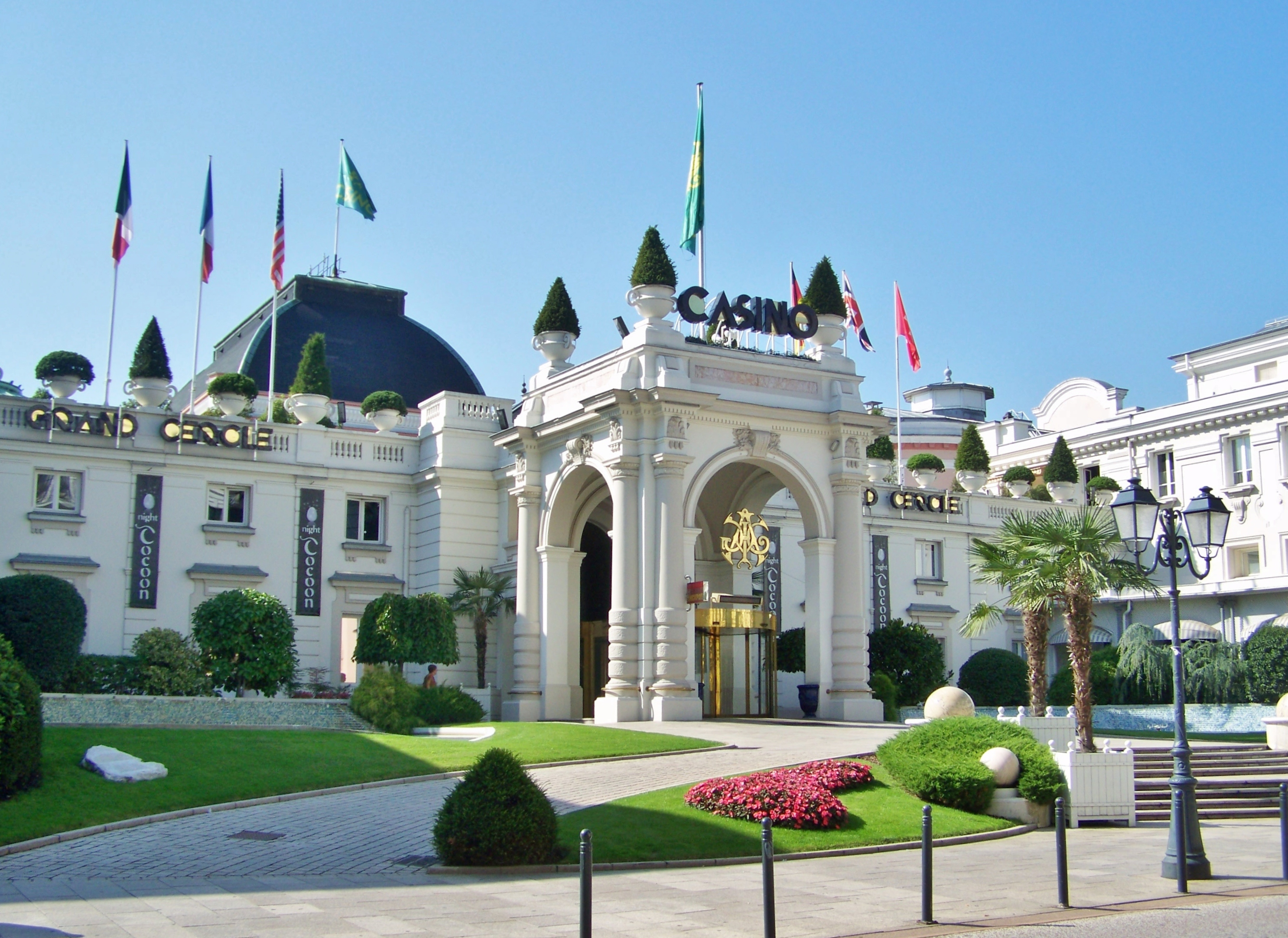
Casino of Aix-les-Bains

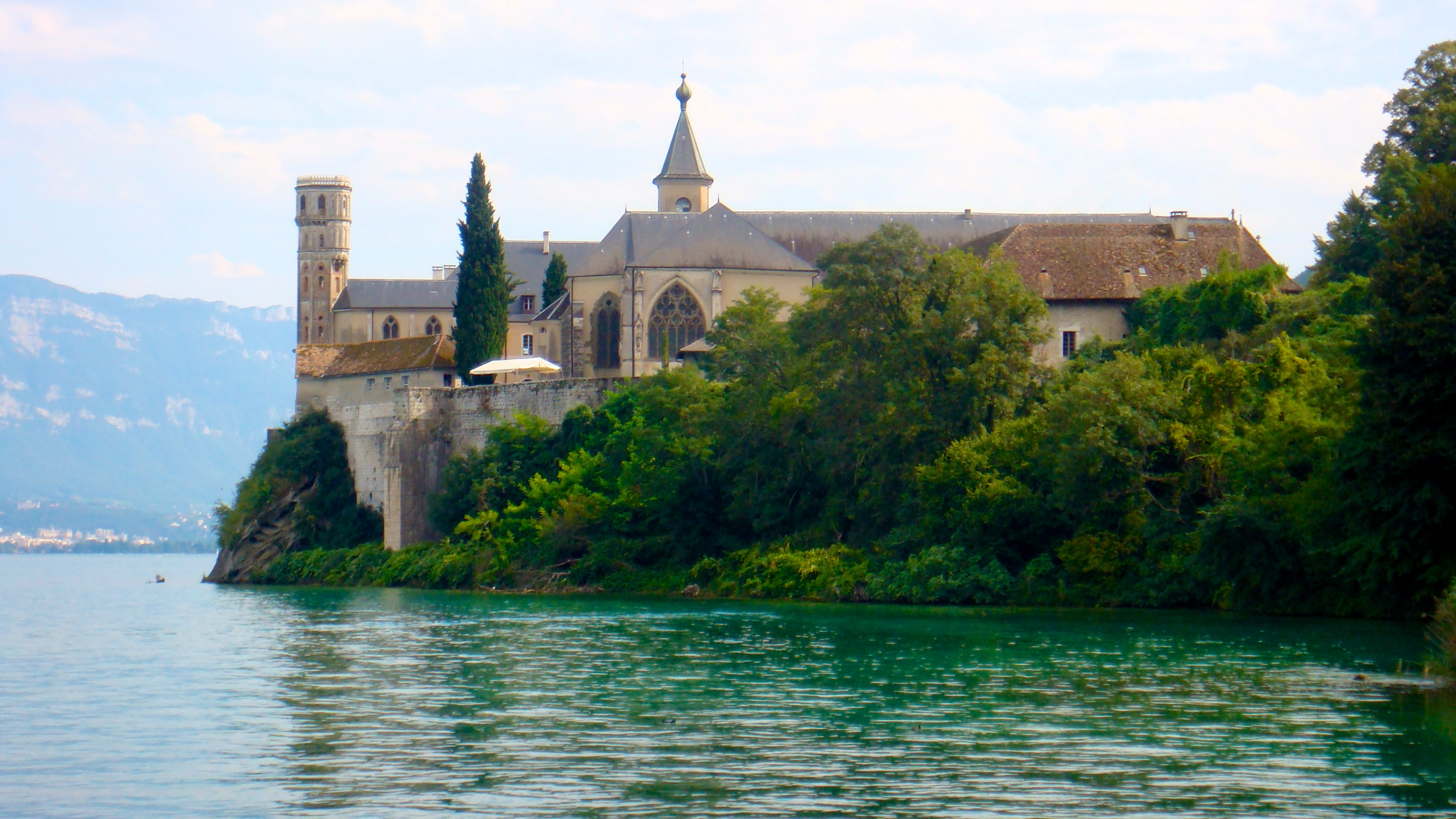
Hautecombe Abbey on the Lac du Bourget

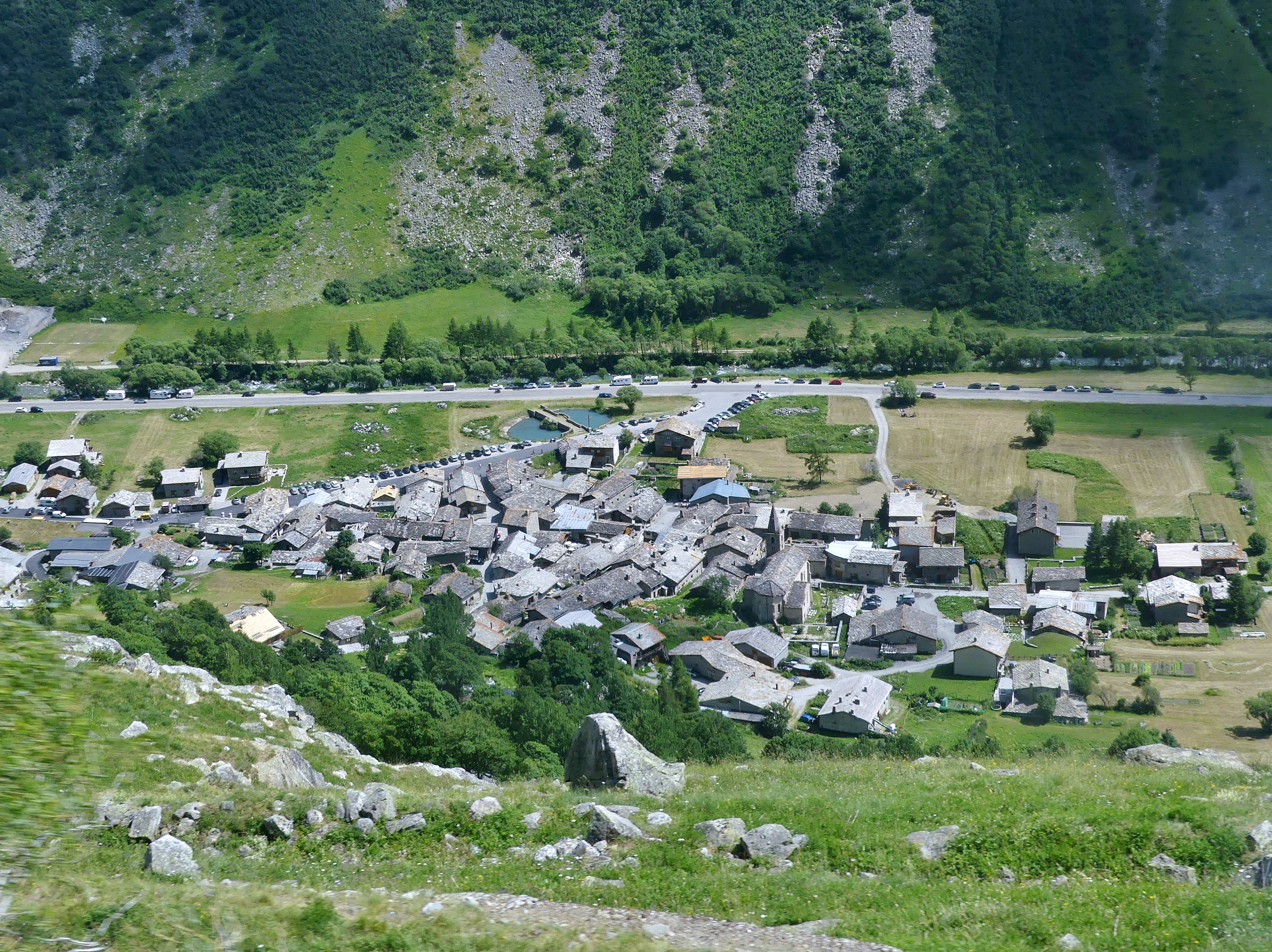
Bonneval-sur-Arc in the Maurienne valley

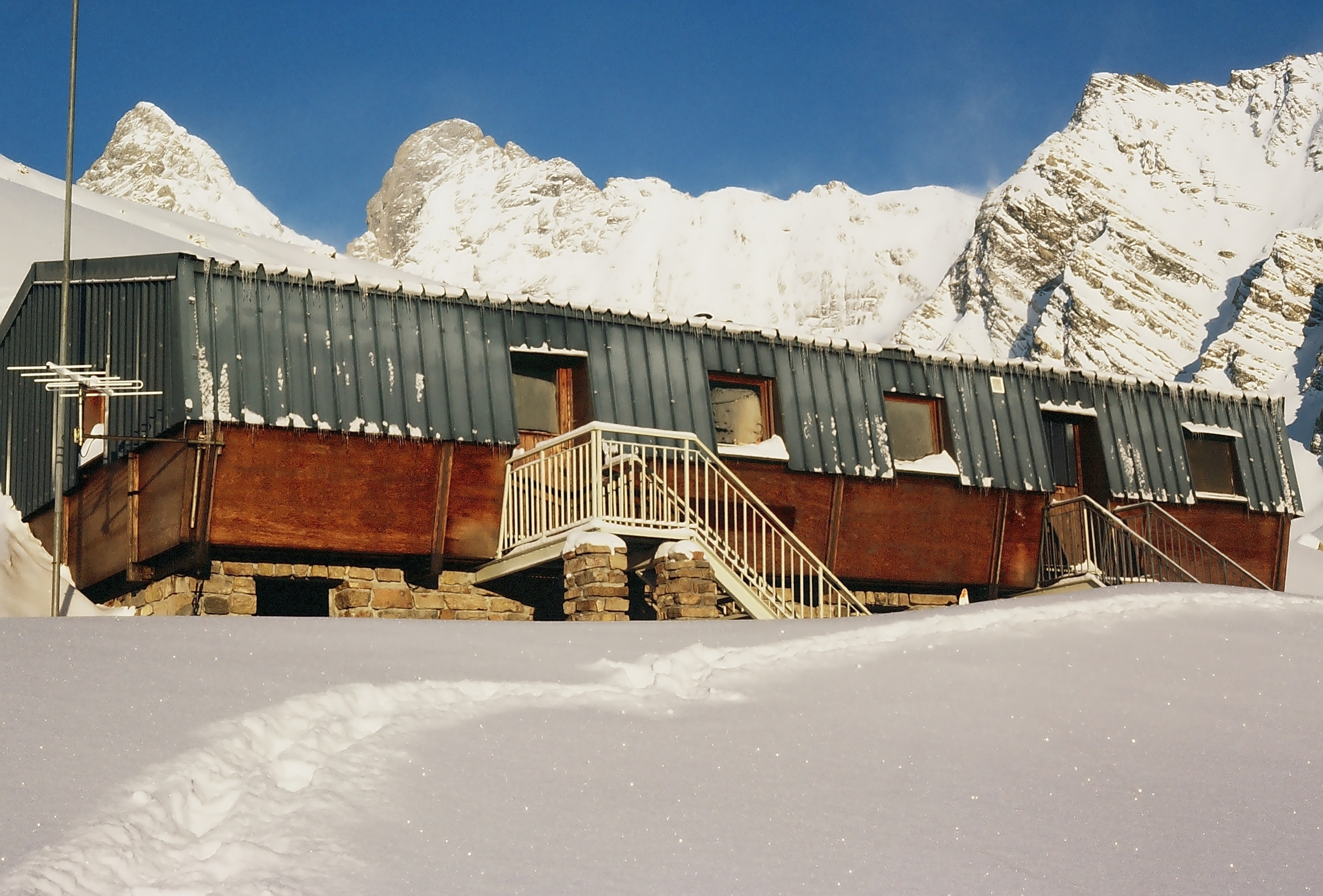
Refuge of the Aiguilles d'Arves

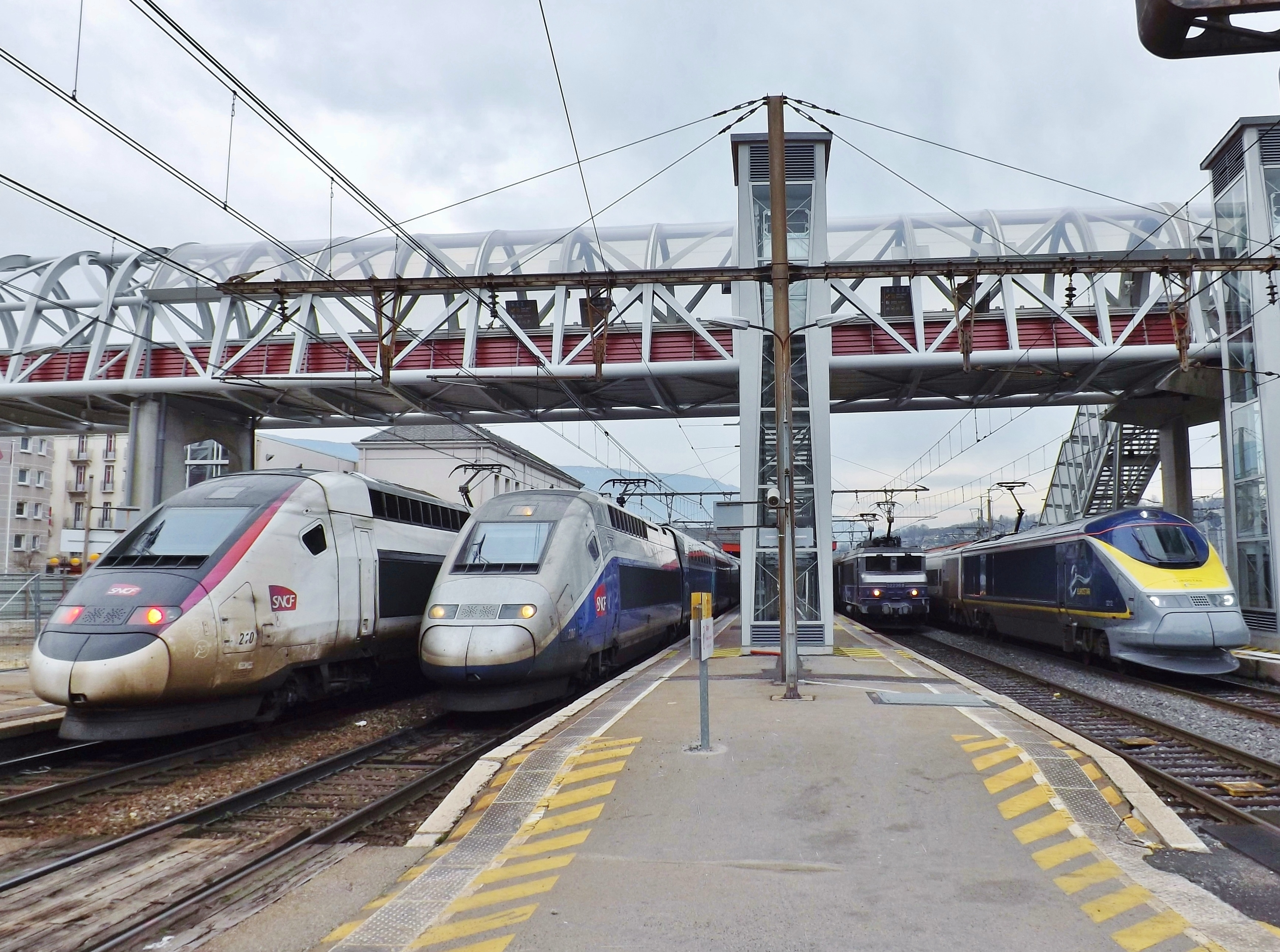
Trains in Savoie

== See also ==
=== History ===
- Savoy, historical region
- House of Savoy, ruling dynasty of Savoy from 1032 to 1860
- Duchy of Savoy, rulers of Savoy region from 1416 to 1720
- Kingdom of Sardinia, 1720 to 1860

=== Language ===
- French language
- Franco-Provençal language

=== Places ===
- Communes of the Savoie department
- Arrondissements of the Savoie department
- Cantons of the Savoie department
- Chambéry
- Aix-les-Bains
- Lac du Bourget, the largest lake in France
- List of historical monuments in Savoy

=== Wine ===
- French wine, AOC wine of Savoie
- Savoy wine or wine of Savoie Allobrogie
