= Col du Chat =

Mountain pass in France

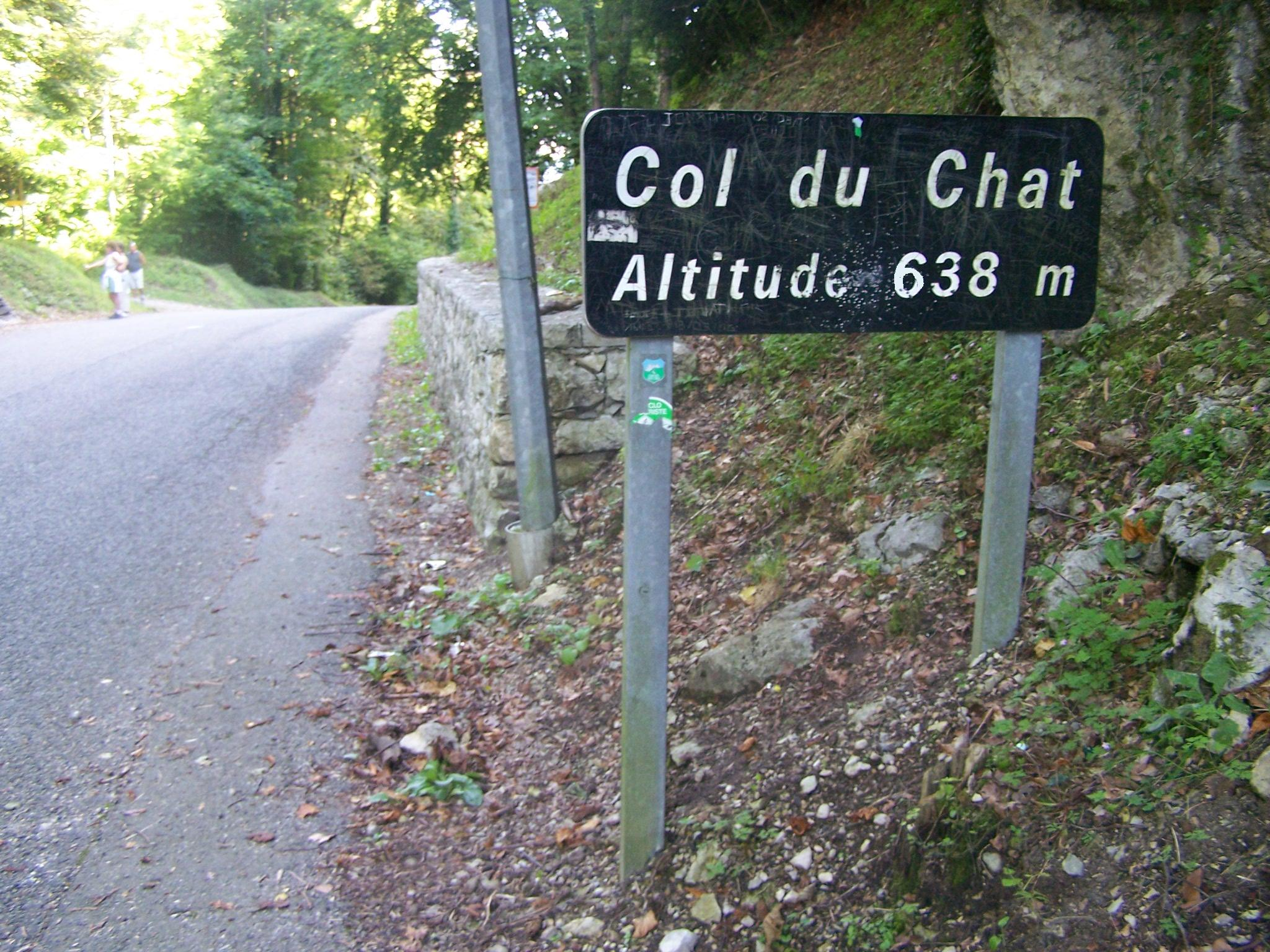
- View of the pass

- Location within France
- Elevation: 638m

Second Approach
- Traversed by: D 914a
- Avg gradient: 5.2 %
- Max gradient: 8 %
- Ascent from: Yenne

Third Approach
- Traversed by: D 914a
- Avg gradient: 5.3 %
- Max gradient: 8 %
- Ascent from: Le Bourget-du-Lac

Location
- Location: Jura Mountains
- Coordinates: 45°41′34″N 5°50′50″E

The Col du Chat is a mountain pass located in France, in the commune of La Chapelle-du-Mont-du-Chat, in the French department of Savoie in the Auvergne-Rhône-Alpes region. It crosses the Mont du Chat in the Jura Mountains, overlooking Lac du Bourget opposite the town of Aix-les-Bains.

Although it has never been crossed by a main transalpine route, the pass has been crossed by a road since ancient times, and its use has often gone beyond the strictly local, at least until the Chat tunnel was opened: Montaigne, for example, used it on his way back from Italy. Today, it is used mainly by tourists, as a climb for cyclists, or as a starting point for hikes to Mont du Chat.

Because of the region's particular flora and fauna, the pass is located within the perimeter of and close to natural zones of ecological, faunal and floristic interest and Natura 2000 reserves. The pass is open all year round, with no winter shutdowns.

== Toponymy ==
The Col du Chat is also known as Col du Mont-du-Chat or Col de Chevelu.

The first known instance of the name Mont du Chat appears in 1209; older texts refer to it as mons munitus or mons Munni. It first appears in the Latin forms mons Catus, mons Catti or montem Cati, then montem du Chat at the end of the 15th century.

In his toponymic study of the Franco-Provençal linguistic zone, G. R. Wipf, after listing a (non-exhaustive) collection of hypotheses on the toponymy of the mountain, the dent and the Col du Chat, tentatively concludes that "the least we can say is that this is a contested toponym". He returns to the subject later in the book, devoting five pages to it.

=== The word "chat" taken literally ===
A first thesis links the name of the range and pass to the legend of the Chapalu, a "well-known Savoyard legend" according to Wipf. Supported in the work of medievalists and folklorists, this interpretation has little support among linguists. Alphonse Gros assumes that the legend "was only invented to provide an explanation for this curious designation." Wipf, without believing in this explanation either, cannot follow it: insofar as the encounter with the chapalu appears in the Arthurian cycle, where it is supposed to take place near "Lac de Lausanne", it is not an ad hoc construction developed around Lac du Bourget.

Dauzat and Rostaing, for their part, explain the name of the mountain's "dent du Chat" by its shape, which they believe evokes that of a cat's canine. Wipf is not convinced either, as his own visual impression of the mountain hardly evokes a feline feature.

=== A Franco-Provençal word ===
For his part, Henri Jaccard considers the Franco-Provençal word sya, meaning saw. He notes the existence of a 1582 source in which the Col du Chat is called "la Sciaz", and links this to the names of places in the Vaud Alps, where the toponymy is explained by the presence of a ridge evoking the teeth of a saw.

=== Personal names ===
The deformation of people's proper names has been suggested. Without dwelling on this possibility, Gros points out that similar-sounding names can be found in charters from the south-east of France: Dominus Rodulfus Cati or even Johannes dictus Chat. André Palluel-Guillard, referring to "other scholars" with no further details, refers to the Catulli, a family name that appears on two inscriptions preserved in the Bourget crypt.

The version supported by Gros is a variant of the previous one: the mountain takes its name from the hamlet of Chevelu (formerly Chavelu), a hamlet whose toponymy he in turn explains by the nickname Capillutis of an inhabitant with a remarkable hair.

=== A Celtic root ===
Two hypotheses refer to Gallic deities: referring to "Joanne", Palluel-Guillard evokes a deformation of Thuat, a spelling of the name of the god Teutates. A second, undoubtedly more serious, is Wipf's mention of the possibility of a common root between "Chat" and "Chambéry", both of which could derive from the name of the legendary king Caturix.

The hypothesis favored by Wipf is derivation from a Celtic root car or cal, designating mountain in pre-Celtic languages. In his view, this root can be found in many Savoyard names, particularly that of Chamonix; this latter connection makes sense, as Wipf also believes he can distinguish a common Celtic root moniz, also designating mountain, in the ancient name of Mont du Chat (mons Munitus) and the name "Chamonix." Gros, for his part, explains mons Munitus by a Latin etymology: a via munita or iter munitum, designating a road or path that required development.

Finally, referring to "Mailland", Palluel-Guillard suggests a derivation from the Celtic root chai, designating a fight or ambush.

== Geography ==
=== Location ===
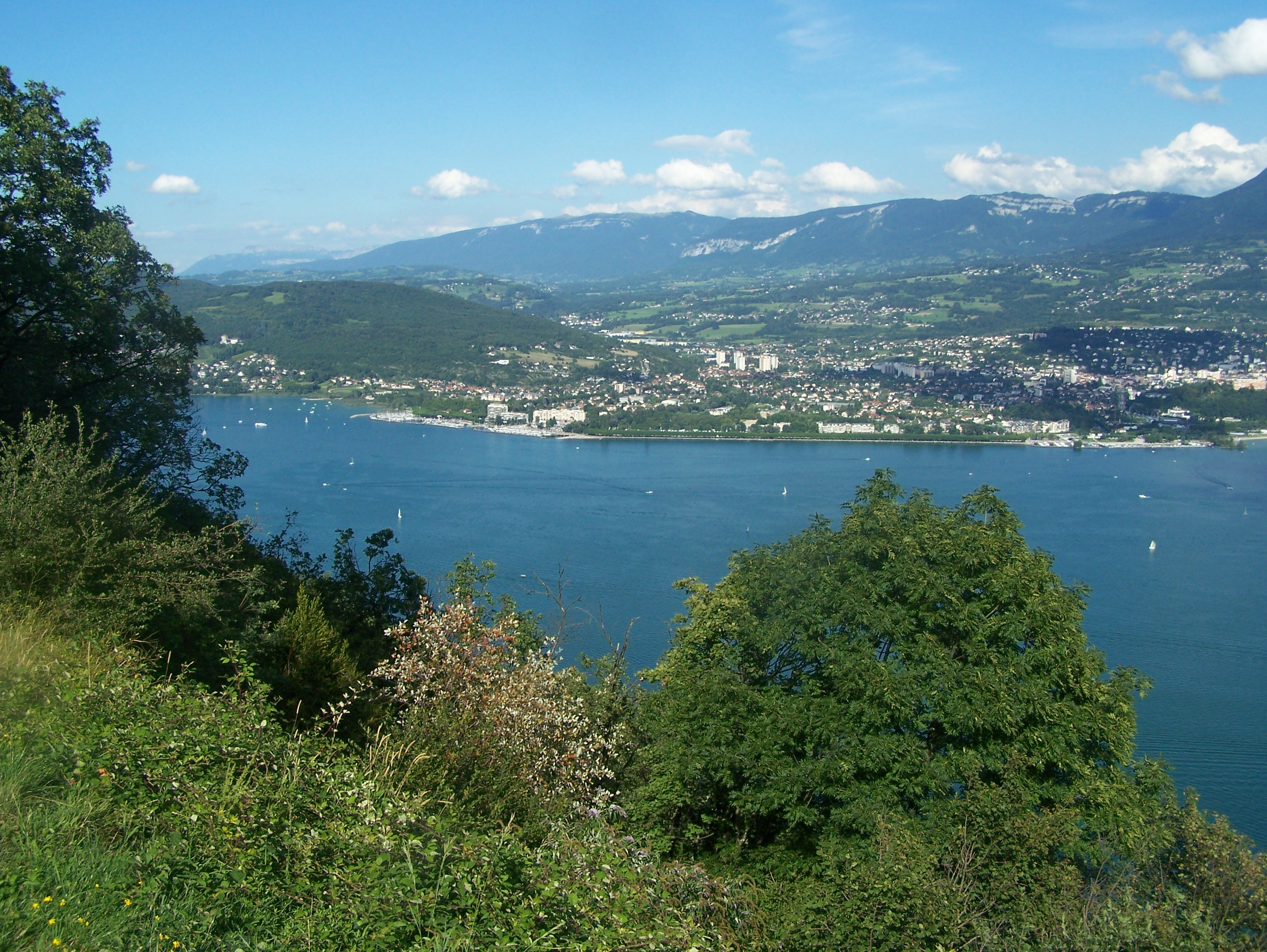
View of Lac du Bourget and the town of Aix-les-Bains from the pass road.

The Col du Chat lies at an altitude of 638 metres. It separates the Mont du Chat, at 1,496 meters above sea level, to the south-southwest, with the Cornillon rock immediately above the pass at around 250 meters, from the Mont de la Charvaz, at 1,158 meters above sea level, to the north. The pass overlooks Lac du Bourget, one kilometer to the east on the Savoie Propre side, by over 400 meters. To the west, it overlooks the Rhône valley by more than 300 meters, on the Savoyard Foreland slope. It lies 1.5 kilometers north-west of Bourdeau, which it overlooks by more than 330 meters, and 2 kilometers south-south-west of La Chapelle-du-Mont-du-Chat, a village set on the edge of the anticline that overlooks Lac du Bourget by more than 400 meters. It lies 1.5 kilometers above the village of Saint-Jean-de-Chevelu, 320 meters below the pass to the west-northwest. The Chat tunnel passes under the mountain 500 metres from the pass, to the south-south-west.

=== Geology ===
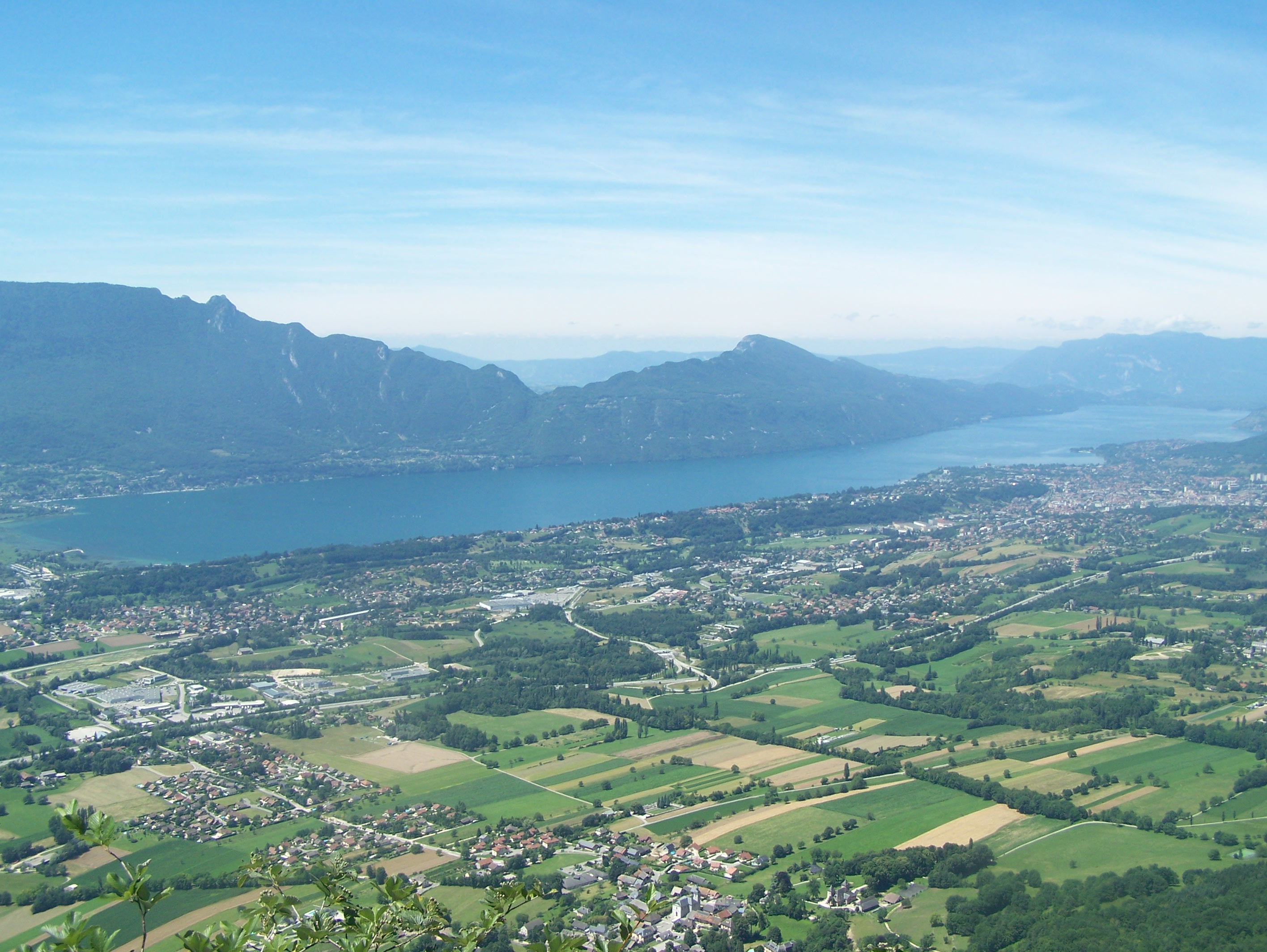
View of Mont du Chat, with the pass visible and easy to spot at the "V", the lowest point.

The pass is cut into the Kimmeridgian limestone of the Mont du Chat. Its bedrock is crossed by a northwest–southeast fault, called the Col du Chat fault, which runs transversely to the anticline. This fault is visible from Saint-Jean-de-Chevelu to Lac du Bourget. It shifts the Cretaceous strata some 500 m to the northeast, suggesting the presence of a detachment. However, cartographic data show no displacement of the Jurassic strata at the level of the fault, and only a very slight displacement at the level of the Mont du Chat fault, crossed by the Col du Chat fault at the western base of the anticline, 1 km north-west of the Col du Chat. The thinness of the Urgonian limestones beneath the first Miocene marine transgression layers at Bourdeau, in contrast to the thicker limestones to the north of the fault at the eastern base of the anticline on the edge of Lac du Bourget, suggests that the fault was formed during the uplift of the Jura at the same period, resulting in a difference in uplift between Mont de la Charvaz and Mont du Chat. The pass was then formed by erosion, before the Miocene marine transgression.

Erosion of the pass was accentuated during glacial periods and its low altitude, compared to that of neighbouring peaks, allowed the Isère glacier to pass through, as did the Col de l'Épine, during the last glaciation and the formation of the Lyon glacial lobe.

=== Climate ===
The mountain climate of the Col du Chat is slightly milder due to the nearby Lac du Bourget, which moderates the Aix region. Two weather stations are located nearby: station no. 73008003 at Aix-les-Bains, 3km to the east, and station no. 73051001 at Mont du Chat, 4km to the south.

=== Fauna and flora ===
The Col du Chat is located in a closed forest zone. The south-facing slope of the pass is populated by beech trees, while the north-facing slope is populated by various deciduous trees associated with conifers in the western part.

The cavities on the western slopes of the pass are home to several different species of bat, including the barbastelle, the grey long-eared and the greater horseshoe, Europe's largest Rhinolophus species. Bird species recorded in the vicinity of the pass include the European nightjar, the Short-toed Eagle, the peregrine falcon, the Woodlark, the European Bee-eater and the Eurasian scops owl. Insects are represented by the great capricorn beetle, southern damselfly and the dusky large blue.

== History and heritage ==
=== Gallo-Roman period ===
The Col du Chat was probably already a passageway in Gallic times, if not earlier. Several scholars, such as Albanis Beaumont, Jean André Deluc and John Antony Cramer around 1800, and later the historian Theodor Mommsen, hypothesized that the pass was used by Hannibal to cross the Alps on his way to Italy; this outdated thesis has now been invalidated.

A network of Roman roads gradually opened up conquered Gaul. The route of the Praetorian road, which linked Vienne to Milan via the Little St Bernard Pass and crossed the Épine-Chat range above a mysterious Labisco about halfway between Augustum (now Aosta, at the confluence of the Rhône and Guiers rivers) and Lemencum (now Lémenc, a district of Chambéry), is not precisely known. However, it is known that it did not cross the range at the Col du Chat, but at a point further south. Although the Col du Chat was not on the transalpine route, it was nevertheless crossed by a "vicinale" road, a more local route for commercial traffic, with a width of around four meters, as opposed to the six meters used by the " Praetorian" roads.

Roman remains were visible on the pass until the mid-19th century; only a few lapidary inscriptions remained, but these have been preserved. These remains are attested to by several travel reports. Alphonse d'Elbène, abbot of Hautecombe, wrote at the end of the 16th century:

The Mont du Chat, situated between the Rhône and Lac du Bourget, is not very difficult to climb, and when you reach the summit and see the walls of an old sanctuary still standing, you will see a stone on which are engraved capital Roman letters, but which, because they are so ancient, no one can understand.

More recently, Albanis Beaumont and Prefect Jean-Joseph de Verneilh-Puyraseau refer to a "temple to Mercury." Contemporary archaeologists are not as assertive as these travelers of two hundred years ago, and the nature of this lost structure is a matter of debate: while it is indeed possible that it was a temple to Mercury (or to Mercury and Mars), others think it was a stopover on the way to the pass. In this second hypothesis, the inscriptions would have come from a simple oratory inside the stopover.

An excavation campaign led by J.-B. Mercier, from 1935 to 1937, uncovered the remains of several small houses near the pass, containing eight skeletons, clearly the victims of assailants, and a few coins from the 4th century. A second campaign, led by Claude Duc in 1939, uncovered a larger treasure trove of 240 coins from the 2nd and 4th centuries, some 100 metres from the hamlet.

=== From the Middle Ages to the early 19th century ===
After the year 1000, the main route over the Épine-Chat chain was the Col Saint-Michel, between Aiguebelette and Cognin, which is almost 300 meters higher than the Col du Chat. Nevertheless, other travellers report crossing the Col du Chat, so the traffic is not just local. In 1395, the Seigneur d'Anglure mentioned it in his Saint Voyage à Jérusalem (Holy Journey to Jerusalem). In 1581, Michel de Montaigne, the most famous tourist ever to cross the Col du Chat, on his return from Italy:

"Already we came to pass the Mont du Chat, high, steep, and stony but by no means dangerous or uneasy, at the foot of which sits a large lake, and along it a castle named Bordeau."

In 1588, Seigneur de Villamont, who had used the Col Saint-Michel on his outward journey, also returned from Italy via the Col du Chat. In 1595, he published his travel memories, which were to be reprinted ten times. Like Montaigne, he recognized that the route was not too difficult, but was not entirely reassuring:

"Well, it's true that it's not at all so rough and nasty, but it's a perilous passage because of the woods it's filled with, and a large lake at the foot, to which easily from the top of the mountain you would throw those you would like to kill to get their money."

At this time, the road from the pass to Chambéry did not follow the contemporary route along the lake, but descended more gradually, passing La Serraz Castle, Bissy Castle and Cognin.

Around 1670, King Charles Emmanuel II had a new road built between France and Savoie Propre, via Les Échelles and the Col de Couz. The concurrent passes, Col Saint-Michel and Col du Chat, were no longer properly maintained and were deteriorating. In 1807, Verneilh, Prefect of Mont-Blanc, reported that the route via the Col du Chat had become "impassable for driving in several places."

=== Modern route ===
It was in 1823 that the construction of a real road through the pass was initiated, to become "route provinciale no 5". The engineers Ernesto Melano and Negretti were entrusted with the management of this project, and they did more than simply renovate the existing road: they created a new road with gentler slopes, supported by remarkable raw stone retaining walls with no cement joints.

By 1848, the new road was up and running. A stagecoach service via the Col du Chat left Chambéry at 2 p.m. and reached La Balme at 6.30 p.m.: a four-and-a-half-hour journey covering less than thirty kilometers. By replacing the light stagecoaches with thirteen-seater carriages pulled by four horses, the journey time was reduced to three hours, but this innovation only remained in service for ten months. On the eve of the First World War, road service over the Col du Chat was still provided by a four-seater patache pulled by a single horse.

After the annexation of Savoie in 1861, the integration of the range's different routes into the French road network reflected their hierarchy: while the Col de Couz, the main route to Lyon, became an "imperial road", the Col du Chat became a "departmental road", while the other crossings of the mountains that remained passable (Col de l'Épine, Col du Crucifix) were only " medium communication roads", of local interest.

At the end of the 19th century, there was already mention of further modernization of the route. In 1881, Victor Barlet, mayor of Saint-Jean-de-Chevelu and general councillor for Yenne, proposed digging a tunnel. At the same time, engineer Maurice Mollard proposed the construction of a rack railway. A law passed in 1907 declared the construction of a funicular railway between the port of Bourdeau and the Col du Chat to be of public interest. In the end, it was the road project that came to fruition: funds were voted in 1928, work began and the Col du Chat tunnel was inaugurated in 1932, relieving the pass of traffic other than tourist or very local traffic.

From the mid-19th century to the Second World War, the proximity of the Aix-les-Bains Spa town made the Col du Chat a popular excursion destination. Several hotels and restaurants offered views of Lac du Bourget and excursions were organized for tourists. On July 11, 1937, President Albert Lebrun, who was on an official trip to Savoie, paid a "private escapade" visit - he had breakfast on the terrace of the Col du Chat hotel - and in July 1943, Jean Giono stayed at the same hotel, where he wrote the play Le Voyage en calèche.

=== Heritage ===
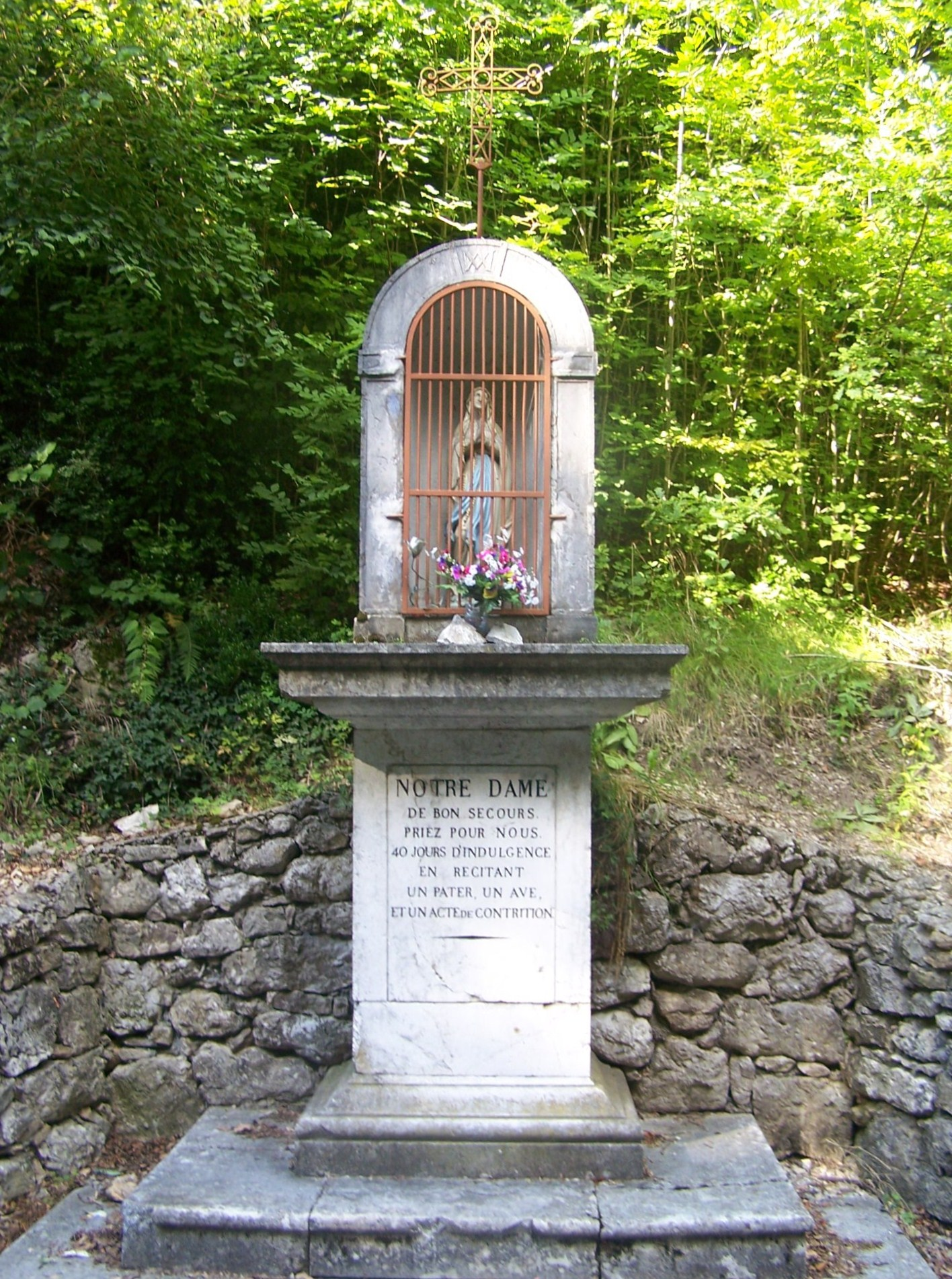
Oratory of N.-D. de Bon Secours.

An oratory dedicated to Notre-Dame de Bon Secours stands on the roadside at the pass. It is built of ashlar and comprises a parallelepiped-shaped pedestal topped by a cornice on which is placed the grilled niche housing the statue of Notre-Dame de Bon Secours, itself topped by a small iron cross. The whole is preceded by three steps.

Between 1830 and 1944, a cement stone quarry, the remains of which can be seen 50 m east of the summit, was operated on the Col du Chat.

== Activities ==
=== Tourism ===
Nowadays, the Col du Chat is used more for tourism, with a parking lot built 100 m along the road to Le Bourget-du-Lac at the start of hikes to the Dent du Chat and trails to the via ferrata and climbing site. Many hikers use it to reach the summit of the Dent du Chat via the normal route, of which the col is the start.

At least until the late 1980s, the Col du Chat was on the route of the GR 9 long-distance hiking trail, which followed the crest of the Charve, Chat and Épine ranges. It was the southern starting point of the GR 59, which split off from the GR 9 at this point.

300 m south of the pass, beneath the Cornillon rock, is a via ferrata, inaugurated on November 17, 2007, whose difficulty ranges from PD+ to AD+. Climbing is also possible on a cliff 400 m to the south-east below the pass, rated very difficult with levels ranging from 6b to 8b+. The pass provides access to a number of nearby villages and hamlets in the Mont du Chat heights.

=== Cycling ===
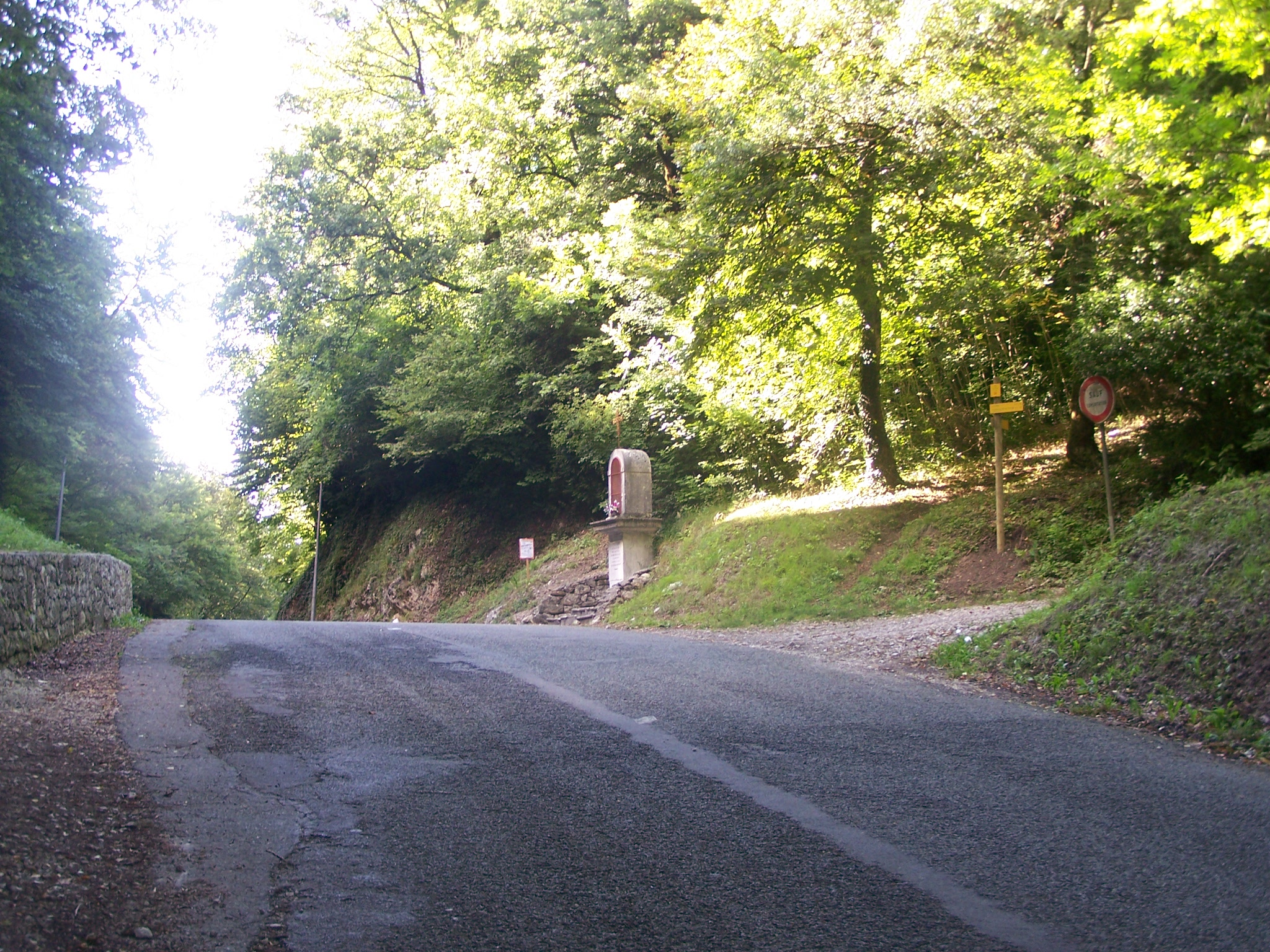
View from the Col du Chat towards Yenne.

The 2011 Critérium du Dauphiné passed over the Col du Chat, then classified as a 2nd category climb from Le Bourget-du-Lac, on stage 4 La Motte-Servolex-Mâcon. French rider Jérémy Roy was the first to reach the summit, just a few weeks before winning the Combativity Award at the 2011 Tour de France. The pass was again on the Critérium program in 2015, on stage 2, which started from Bourget-du-Lac. Eritrean rider Daniel Teklehaimanot (MTN-Qhubeka), the event's future best climber, took the lead.

It is crossed by four Savoie cycle tourism routes: cyclo route 53 Tour du lac du Bourget from Aix-les-Bains to Bourget-du-Lac, 50km long and classified as an athletic route; cyclo route 56 Tour de l'Épine, an 88km loop around the Épine anticline, starting and finishing in Chambéry, classified as an athletic route; cyclo route 57 Traversée de l'Épine, starting and finishing in Chambéry via the Col de l'Épine and the Col du Chat, 54km long, classified as an athletic course; and cyclo route 58 Mont du Chat, starting in Chambéry and finishing in Bourget-du-Lac passing through the Mont du Chat ascent and the Col du Chat, 62km long, also classified as an athletic course.

=== Environmental protection ===
The Col du Chat lies at the heart of the Montagne de l'Épine and Mont du Chat type II Zone naturelle d'intérêt écologique, faunistique et floristique (ZNIEFF) (no. 7303), which encompasses the entire anticline complex. This zone is of great botanical interest due to the presence of forest habitats such as neutrophilous beech forests, one of which is located a few hundred meters north of the pass. Mediterranean-type species are also found here, such as dyer's sumach, and other species of great interest such as anthora, which forms on exposed scree slopes. The area is also characterized by the presence of mountain species at particularly low altitudes, as well as Alpine and Jura species at the limits of their range. It is a breeding and feeding ground for a variety of species and forms an ecological corridor linking the Jura massif with the sub-alpine massifs.

The pass is also located at the southern end of the ZNIEFF type I Haut de la Charvaz (no. 73030005), which encompasses the summit and the entire western slope of the Charvaz mountain. The exposure of this slope has led to the development of drought-adapted environments, the protection of which is a European issue in the 21st century. 400 m west of the pass, on the edge of the road leading down to the Rhône valley, lie the former Pommaret quarries, also classified as a type I ZNIEFF (no. 73030006). Covering an area of 1.35 ha, the cavities are home to numerous bat species.

400 m north of the pass lies the southern end of the site of Community interest known as the Avant-Pays Savoyard network of wetlands, grasslands, moors and cliffs, proposed for creation in April 2002 over an area of 3,156 ha, and the Avant-Pays Savoyard special protection area, classified since April 2006 over an area of 3,125 ha. These two classified areas are part of the Natura 2000 network. Their perimeters are virtually identical, and some areas extend to the foot of the pass, 2 km west of the summit.

== Popular culture ==
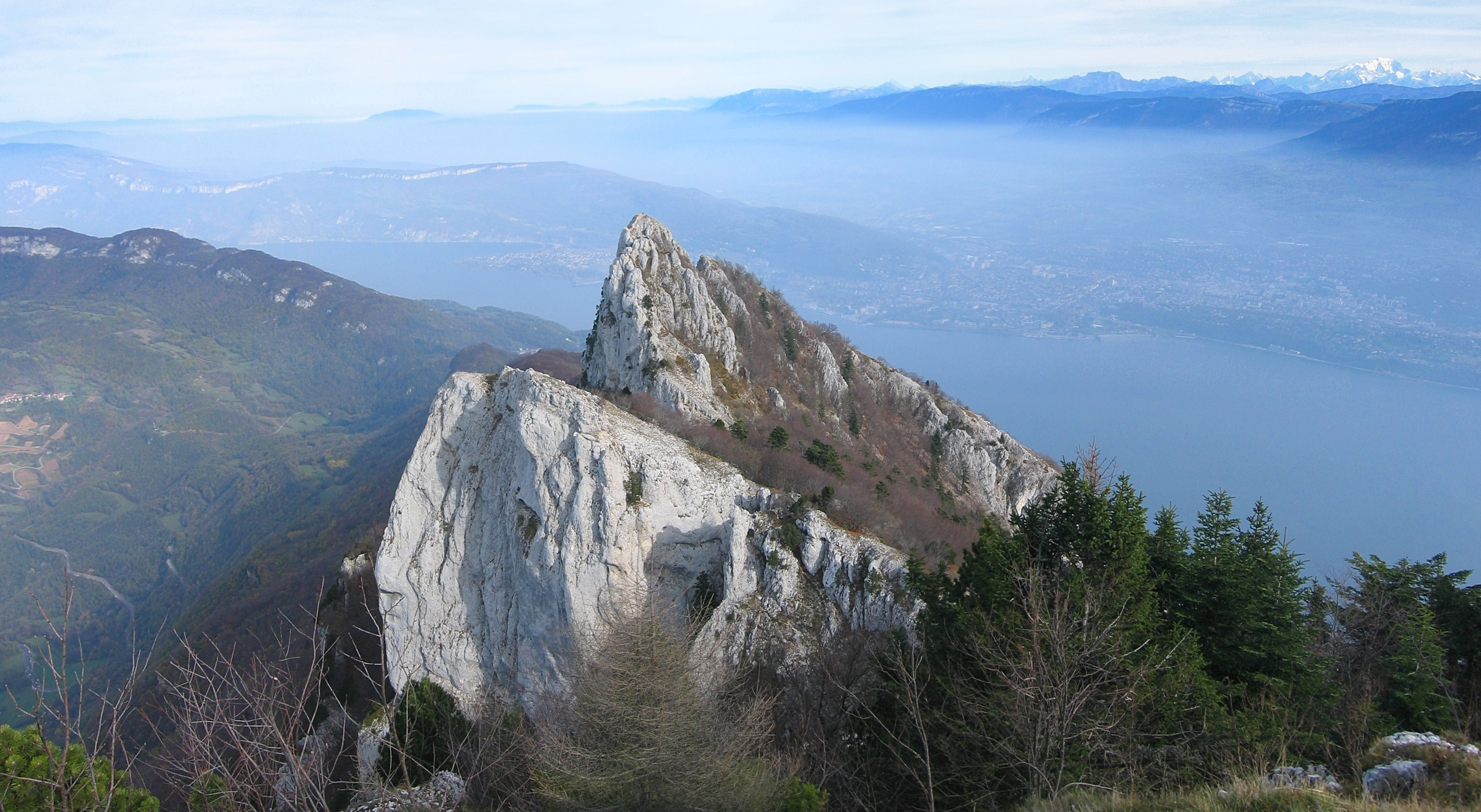
View of the Dent du Chat, with part of the winding road leading to the Col du Chat on the left of the Dent.

The Cat's Tooth is attached to a popular legend originating in L'Estoire de Merlin, part of the Vulgate cycle of Arthurian legend, which features the monstrous feline Chapalu. A fisherman on Lake Geneva who fails to catch a single fish promises to offer his first catch to God, and breaks his word. He reels in a small black cat on the third catch, and offers it to his children. The animal becomes monstrous, and he releases it into the mountains. The cat then devours the fisherman's entire family, and attacks the travellers. It is finally killed by Arthur, who provokes it with Merlin's help. Pouncing on the king, the Chapalu is slaughtered.

Local folklore has variations on this story, in which the cat's death is attributed to two brothers who attack him with a war machine and finish him off with a cutlass, or to a soldier from Le Bourget, who kills him with an arquebus. Similarly, the Lac du Bourget replaces the old location. From the 14th century onwards, the creature was described as entrenched in a large cave, and from the 16th century onwards, King Arthur's legendary battle was moved to Mont du Chat. The name of the mountain, known since 1232, would attest to the fixation of the legend. In 1619, the Franciscan Jacques Fodéré recopied the legend as a cat the size of a tiger, and introduced Arthur's two brother knights, Berius and Melianus. At the end of the nineteenth century, Émile Freymond collected popular traditions relating to this legend. He was told by the elders of the Savoyard region that the cat devoured one in ten or one in twenty travellers from a cave near the pass, and that a knight or soldier who was the tenth to pass killed it. The mention of this "big cat" in Savoy may have been popularized by the actual presence of the lynx until recently.
