= La Chapelle-du-Mont-du-Chat =

Commune in Auvergne-Rhône-Alpes, France

- Commune
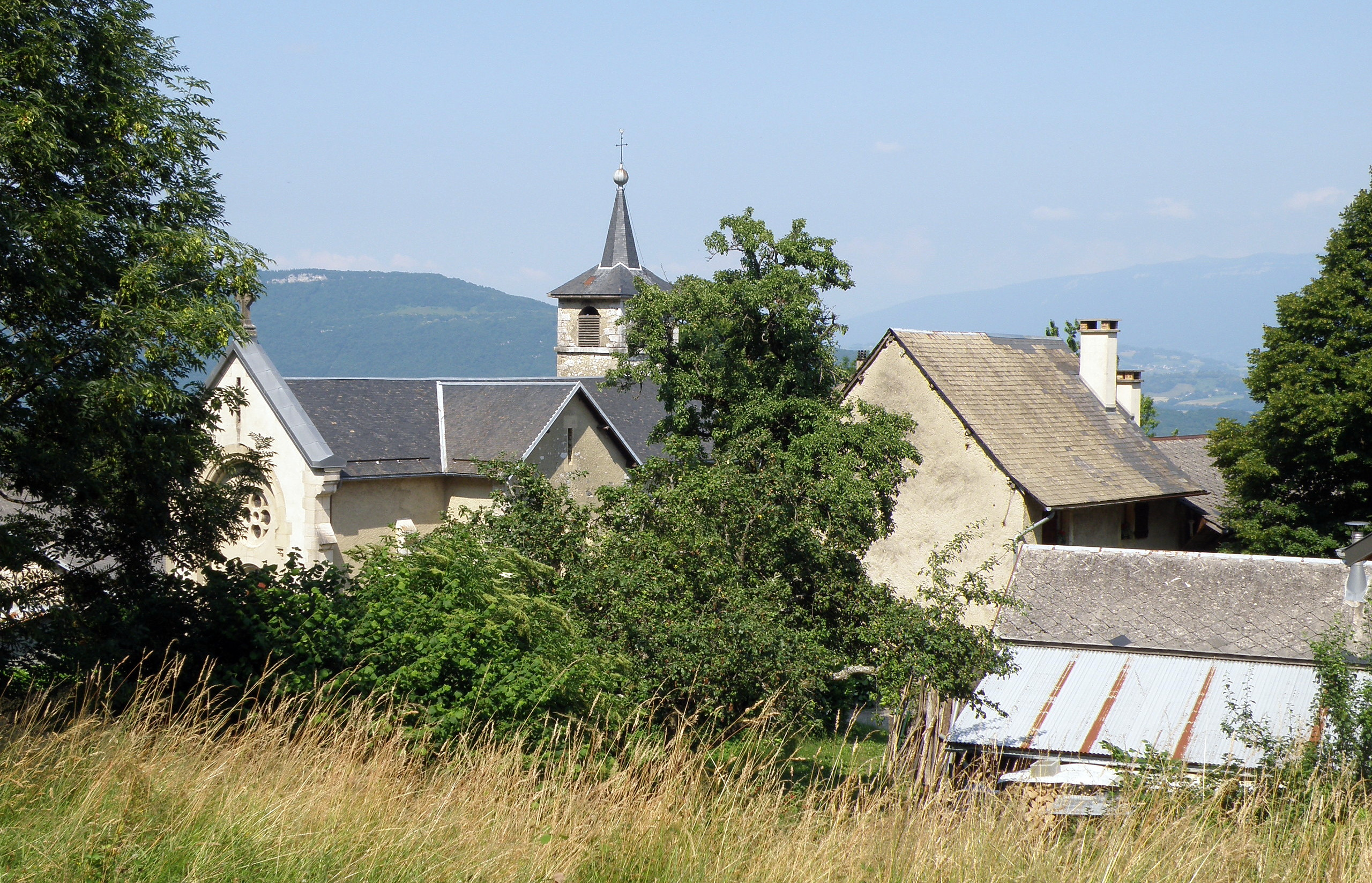
- A general view of La Chapelle-du-Mont-du-Chat
- Location of La Chapelle-du-Mont-du-Chat
- Location within France Location within Auvergne-Rhône-Alpes
- Coordinates: 45°42′21″N 5°51′17″E
- Country: France
- Region: Auvergne-Rhône-Alpes
- Department: Savoie
- Arrondissement: Chambéry
- Canton: La Motte-Servolex
- Intercommunality: CA Grand Lac

Government
  - Mayor (2026–32): Bruno Morin
- Area^{1}: 7.08 km^{2} (2.73 sq mi)
- Highest elevation: 1,005 m (3,297 ft)
- Lowest elevation: 231 m (758 ft)
- Population (2023): 269
  - Density: 38.0/km^{2} (98.4/sq mi)
- Time zone: UTC+01:00 (CET)
  - Summer (DST): UTC+02:00 (CEST)
- INSEE/Postal code: 73076 /73370
- Website: https://lachapelledumontduchat.fr/
- ^{1} French Land Register data, which excludes lakes, ponds, glaciers > 1 km^{2} (0.386 sq mi or 247 acres) and river estuaries.

La Chapelle-du-Mont-du-Chat (French pronunciation: [la ʃapɛl dy mɔ̃ dy ʃa]; Arpitan: La Shapèla) is a commune in the Savoie department in the Auvergne-Rhône-Alpes region in south-eastern France. It lies on the western side of Lac du Bourget, on the eastern slopes of the Mont du Chat range, opposite the spa town of Aix-les-Bains.

The commune is part of the arrondissement of Chambéry, the canton of La Motte-Servolex and the intercommunal authority Grand Lac.

== Geography ==
La Chapelle-du-Mont-du-Chat occupies a narrow mountain-and-lakeside territory on the west shore of Lac du Bourget. The village and its hamlets are set above the lake on the flank of the Mont du Chat, with elevations ranging from 231 m to 1,005 m. The settlement overlooks the lake and faces Aix-les-Bains and the Bauges massif on the opposite shore.

The commune covers 7.08 km^{2} (2.73 sq mi). Its traditional settlement pattern is dispersed, with several hamlets historically grouped around La Chapelle, including Gratteloup, Le Grand Villard, Le Petit Villard and Communal; the former hamlet of Le Puys has disappeared.

The area is crossed by local roads linking the lake shore and the Col du Chat, a pass historically used to cross the Mont du Chat range. The commune's position between lake, forest and upland pastures also makes it a starting point for walking routes and viewpoints over Lac du Bourget.

=== Neighbouring communes ===
La Chapelle-du-Mont-du-Chat borders Bourdeau, Saint-Jean-de-Chevelu, Billième, Ontex and Saint-Pierre-de-Curtille. Across Lac du Bourget it faces the communes on the Aix-les-Bains side of the lake.

== Toponymy ==
The place-name is attested in medieval Latin forms such as Parrochia Capelle in 1344, Parrochia capellae montis Cati in 1437 and Capella montis Cati in the 17th century. Later forms include La Chapelle-Mont-du-Chat and Mont-du-Chat.

The name refers to a chapel associated with the Mont du Chat area. Local history distinguishes this medieval origin from the present Notre-Dame-de-l'Étoile chapel, which occupies the choir of an older parish church rather than the building that gave the commune its name.

== History ==
The slopes above Lac du Bourget were long less densely settled than the more accessible lowlands of the surrounding region. The Col du Chat formed an important passage across the mountain, and local historical accounts record that an ancient route crossed the pass and that a sanctuary, probably dedicated to Mercury, existed there in the Roman period.

Permanent rural settlement developed in the Middle Ages. According to the commune's local history, the area was cleared and organised from the 12th century under the influence of the priors of Le Bourget-du-Lac, who were lords of the locality. The community was traditionally composed of small hamlets on the slope above the lake. Agriculture, forest use and the exploitation of difficult mountain land shaped local life for several centuries.

Like the rest of historic Savoy, La Chapelle-du-Mont-du-Chat belonged to the Savoyard states before the annexation of Savoy by France in 1860. During the French Revolution, the commune was known as Mont-du-Chat before the older name was restored.

The population reached a historical high in the 19th century before a long rural decline. Local records cite 230 inhabitants in 1560 and 357 inhabitants in 1848; by 1975, the population had fallen to 61. The trend later reversed, helped by new construction, renovation of older housing and the conversion of a former holiday colony into residential accommodation.

In 2002, the village church and former presbytery were used as filming locations for the French television miniseries L'Été rouge.

== Administration ==
La Chapelle-du-Mont-du-Chat is administered from the mairie at 192 rue du Solan. It belongs to the arrondissement of Chambéry and to the canton of La Motte-Servolex. It is a member commune of Grand Lac, the intercommunal community centred on the Lac du Bourget basin.

Bruno Morin was re-elected in the 2026 municipal election; his list won the commune's 11 municipal council seats in the first round.

== Population and society ==
In 2022, INSEE recorded a population of 267 inhabitants, a density of 37.7 inhabitants per square kilometre and 112 households in the commune. The same source recorded 145 dwellings in 2022, of which 77.1% were principal residences and 18.6% were second homes or occasional dwellings.

The commune's population decline in the 19th and 20th centuries was followed by renewed growth from the late 20th century. The recovery has been linked to residential development and to the commune's proximity to the Chambéry and Aix-les-Bains urban areas, as well as to the Savoie Technolac technology and university site at Le Bourget-du-Lac.

== Economy ==
La Chapelle-du-Mont-du-Chat has a small local economy typical of a rural mountain commune. INSEE recorded 31 jobs at the place of work in 2022 and eight employer establishments at the end of 2024. Most employer establishments were in commerce, transport and miscellaneous services, with smaller shares in construction and in public administration, education, health or social work.

== Culture and heritage ==
=== Notre-Dame-de-l'Étoile ===
The best-known local monument is the Chapelle Notre-Dame-de-l'Étoile, situated on a prominent viewpoint above Lac du Bourget. The chapel is the surviving choir of the old parish church, which was deconsecrated in 1832. The church was built around 1500 by the monks of the priory of Le Bourget, who were then lords of the area. After the nave was demolished, the choir was restored in 1854 under the initiative of the parish priest Perrier; stained-glass windows were installed between 1885 and 1890 by the parish priest Rosset.

Near the chapel are remains associated with a building once used as a refuge by monks of Le Bourget during periods of war or epidemic. The chapel and its belvedere are visited for views over the lake and the surrounding mountains.

=== Col du Chat ===
The Col du Chat lies near the commune and is associated with ancient routes across the Mont du Chat range. Local tradition and historical writing mention ruins at or near the pass that were interpreted as those of a Roman temple to Mercury. The pass is now known for its road access, walking routes and views of Lac du Bourget and the surrounding Savoyard landscape.

=== Walking routes ===
Several walking routes pass through the commune, including routes linking the hamlets, Notre-Dame-de-l'Étoile and viewpoints over Lac du Bourget. Grand Lac describes the commune as a place for hiking from the lake shore to the summits and upland pastures.

== See also ==
- Communes of the Savoie department
- Col du Chat
- Lac du Bourget
- Mont du Chat
