= Cath Palug =

Monstrous cat in Welsh legend

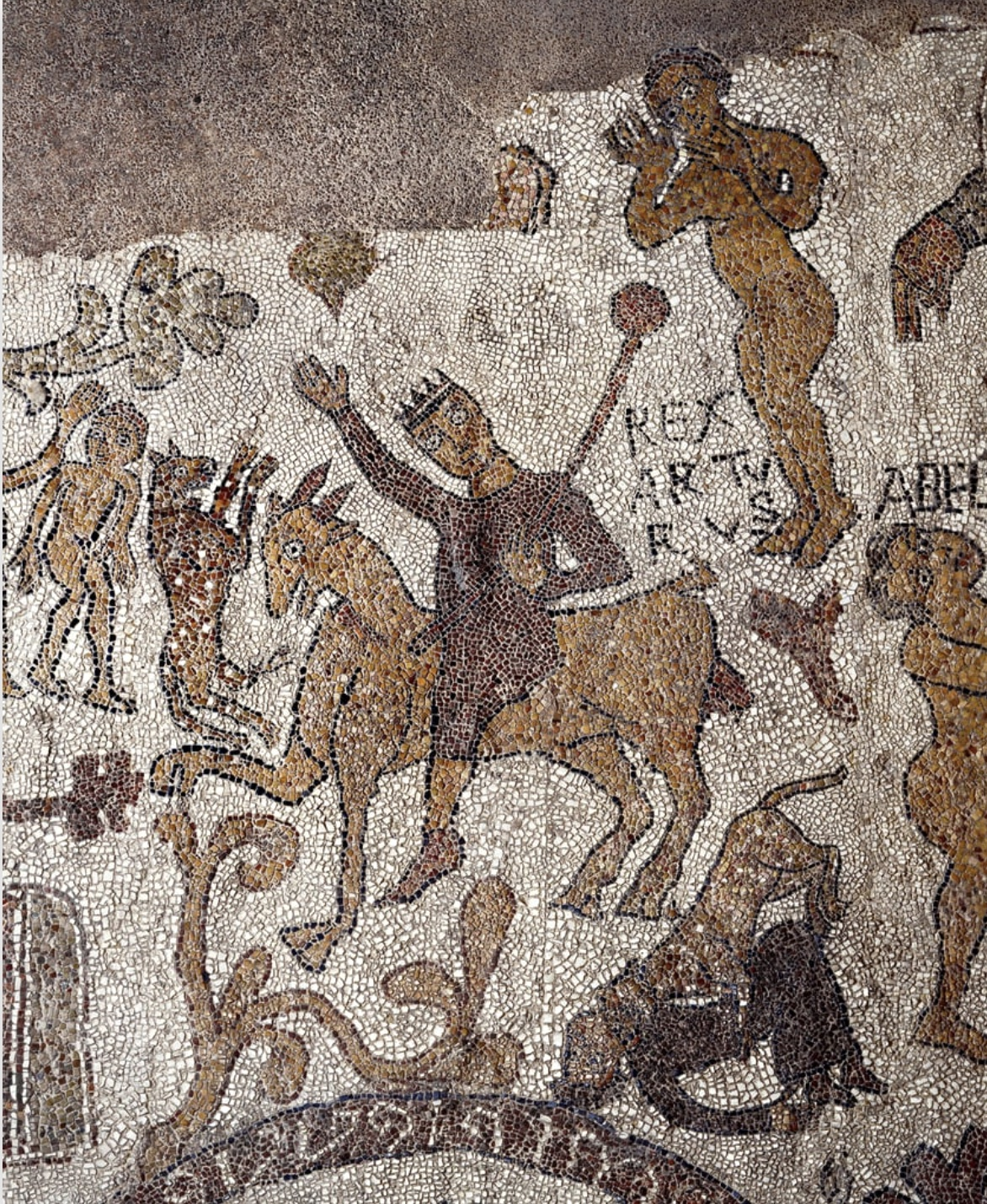
Supposed Capalus in combat with King Arthur (cf. § Iconography) —Otranto Cathedral, floor mosaic dated to c. 1165.

Cath Palug (also Cath Paluc, Cath Balug, Cath Balwg, literally 'Palug's Cat') was a monstrous cat in Welsh mythology associated with Arthurian legend. Given birth to in Gwynedd by the pig Henwen of Cornwall, the cat was to haunt the Isle of Anglesey until Kay went to the island to hunt it down. Outside of Wales, the cat's opponent has been transposed to King Arthur himself or, occasionally, other legendary heroes such as Ogier the Dane. Cath Palug's name in French literature is Chapalu (Old French and variant modern forms: Capalu, Capalus).

== Etymology ==
The Welsh name Cat Palug may mean "scratching cat", but this is just one of a range of possible meanings. The word palug (paluc) is theorized to have a common pal- stem, which may mean: 'hit, strike', 'cut, lop', 'scratch, claw', or even 'dig, pierce'. (Note: Some words in the group are palu 'to dig' and paladr '(spear) shaft'.) (Note: In the group belongs the word palach ('club'; plural pelach glossed in Latin as clavae), which occurs in the nickname Pen-Pelach ('Cudgel-head'), which alongside Cath Palug is listed among Arthur's or Kay's enemies in the poem Pa Gur.)

Chapalu, the French form can be broken down into chat 'cat' + palu 'bog', hence 'the bog cat'. In an Anglo-Norman poem (see §Li Romanz des Franceis), Chapalu and palu are connected in the story (the words are end-rhymed in the couplet). (Note: Bromwich adds this is a case where a Welsh word of an entirely different meaning has been reinterpreted in French in a different meaning. Another example being Caradoc Vreichvras.)

== Aquatic nature ==
Cath Palug is always localised near water, such as the lakes of Lac du Bourget and Lake Geneva in France (cf. also § Local lore), or the sea in Wales. One story describes it as some sort of fish-cat. The monstrous cat of Lausanne, which was the analogue in the Vulgate Merlin started out as a black kitten caught by a fisherman in his net.

== Welsh sources ==
Cath Palug is mentioned in just two works among early Welsh sources, the triads and a fragmentary poem.

=== Triads ===
Cath Palug's birth origins are given in "The Powerful Swineherds" in the Welsh Triads (Trioedd Ynys Prydein, end of the 13th century). According to this source, it started life as a kitten (lit "whelp"), given birth by the great white sow Henwen at the black rock in Llanfair. (Note: Llanfair-is-gaer, a former parish in Arfon (district), Gwynedd) There the kitten was cast into the sea, but it crossed the Menai Strait and was found on Ynys Môn (Anglesey), where the sons of Palug raised it, not realizing the cat was to become one of the three great plagues of the island.

=== Pa Gur ===
Cath Palug was fought and slain by Cai (Kay), or so it is implied, in the incomplete Old Welsh poem Pa Gur yv y Porthaur found in the Llyfr Du Caerfyrddin (The Black Book of Carmarthen, written before 1250). Kay had gone to destroy lleown (possibly meaning 'lions') in Môn (Anglesey). In the encounter, nine scores (180) warriors have been killed by the cat.

The fragmentary poem states that Kay's shield is mynud against the cat, which has been construed in various ways, (Note: Skene translated this as "ready", Bromwich as "a fragment(?) against".) but plausibly interpreted as "polished against Palug's cat". This description coincides with the Middle English story in the Lambeth manuscript, in which Arthur raises a shield (presumably mirrored) causing the cats to attack their own shadows reflected in it.

== Arthurian stories ==
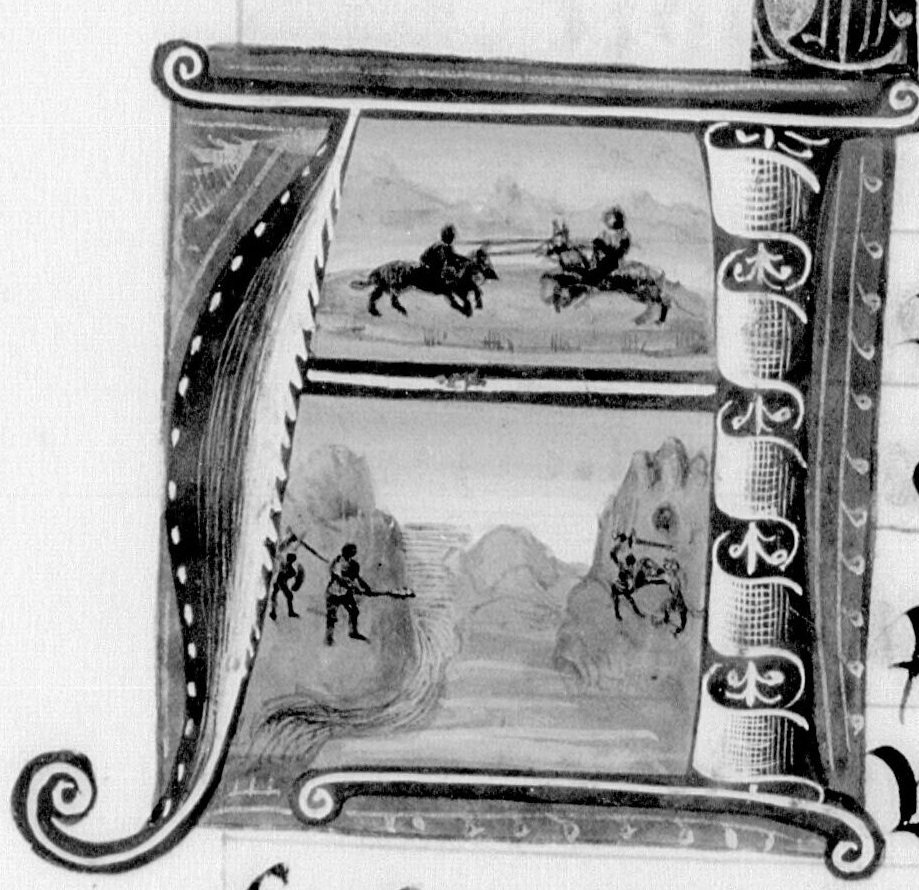
Monstrous cat of Lake Lausanne (chat du lac de Losane) confronting Arthur. — Historiated letter by Guillaume II Le Roy in Pierre Sala Les hardiesses de plusieurs roys, Paris, BNF, fr. 10420

The Chapalu (Capalu) is the equivalent monster in Old French and Anglo-Norman sources. (Note: Gaston Paris made the important connection comparing Manuel und Amande with the Anglo-Norman poem and the prose Merlin (Paris (G.) (1888), pp. 219–220), but did not extend the comparison to the Welsh sources. Connection to the Cath Palug of the Welsh were made by Nutt and by Freymond.) Several works relate a battle between Chapalu (or an anonymous monster cat) with King Arthur himself, rather than with his knight Kay. Sometimes the beast wins, sometimes Arthur wins.

Some of the works only speak of an anonymous cat or cats, but are considered examples of Chapalu encounters by commentators, due to the parallels. (Note: Similarities in the personages involved Arthur and other motifs. A motif analysis is given for example in Freymond (1899), pp. 354–357) The cat of Lausanne (Losan) that Arthur fights in the Vulgate Cycle is a notable example of the cat not being named.

The king is the victor in the Vulgate Merlin and in a Middle-English romance in the Lambert ms. noted above. His defeat is noted in several romances that are essentially non-Arthurian, but can be viewed as a French joke against the English, although some researchers believed some genuine tradition of an alternative death of Arthur.

The oldest chivalric romance in Spanish, The Book of the Knight Zifar speaks of a perilous situation figuratively, as tantamount to King Arthur facing the Gato Paul, which is considered a reference to Arthur fighting the monstrous cat. (Note: Michael Harney (Harney (2003)) credits María Rosa Lida de Malkiel with this observation. Charles Philip Wagner (1903), The Sources of El Cavallero Cifar, pp. 49–50 has noted this also.)

=== Li Romanz des Franceis ===
In the early 13th century, the Anglo-Norman poet André de Coutance rebuked the French for having written a vindictive poem (or poems) describing King Arthur's death by a cat. André indignantly added that this was an utter lie.

This passage in André's work Li Romanz des Franceis (The Romance of the French) has been excerpted and commented in various studies. (Note: The lines in the poem skipped over by the commentators in ellipses explicitly state that the French were motivated patriotism and wished to "exact vengeance on the English" ("S'en volent vengier li Engleis).) André's short résumé of the French work was that Chapalu kicked Arthur into a bog, afterwards killed Arthur, swam to England and became king in his place.

=== Manuel und Amande ===
A French original is thought to have existed to the fragmentary, Middle German poem Manuel und Amande written between 1170 and the beginning of the 13th century. It implies that slain by a sort of a "fish-cat", or strictly according to the text, it was a fish which at the same time "had the form of a cat (katze gestalt)". (Note: Gaston Paris called it a being that was "a cat and fish at the same time".)

This was considered to be a work in the same tradition as the French works that told of Arthur's dishonorable demise, such as polemicized against by André.

=== Vulgate Merlin ===
In the early 13th-century L'Estoire de Merlin (The Story of Merlin), a man fishing in the lake of Lausanne swears that he will dedicate to God the first creature that he catches, but fails to keep his oath. At the third cast of his line he catches a black kitten, which he takes home, only for it to grow to gigantic proportions. The giant cat then kills the fisherman and his entire family, and subsequently any traveller unwise enough to come near the lake. It is finally slain by Arthur.

=== Galeran de Bretagne ===
Galeran de Bretagne (Galeran of Brittany, written in the 13th century) is another work that refers to Arthur's combat with the cat. According to the summary given by Emile Freymond (and by Gaston Paris), Galeran of Brittany beats his German opponent Guynant, and the latter tries to rile up the Breton by repeating the contrueve ('idle lie') that the great cat killed Arthur in a pitched battle.

There is some issue of dissent regarding this interpretation. The text can be read in the converse, so that the German knight says Arthur had killed the cat. Freymond noted that while this was grammatically possible, it was not an allowable interpretation in the context. Paris agreed on this point. However, John Beston (2008) translated the portion at issue as "the proverb about King Arthur killing the cat".

== Other heroes ==
Chapalu is encountered by heroes from the Charlemagne cycle, in either late interpolations or later prose sequels to the original chanson de geste.

=== Rainouart ===
Chapalu is fought by the knight Rainouart in a late version of La Bataille Loquifer in the Guillaume d'Orange cycle (La Geste de Garin de Monglane). The epic originally written c. 1170 did not contain the episode, but a late-13th century interpolation to it introduced Arthurian elements. An extract containing the Chapalu portion was published by Antoine Le Roux de Lincy in 1836; (Note: Le Roux e Lincy identified his manuscript as La Vallière no. 23, now Bibliotheque nationale, Français 24369-24370.) Paulin Paris wrote summaries based on a different manuscript. (Note: P. Paris in the summary in Hist. vol. XXII, relies more on ms. 7535, ca. fol. now BnF Français 1448, 295; he does give ms. 2085, now BnF Français 368, ca. fol. 231, as variant.)

Chapalu here was the son born after the lutin Gringalet (Note: "Rigalez .j. muton" in Le Roux de Lincy (1836), p. 253.) (Note: Gringalet is also the name of the horse of Gauvain. This might explain the description of the chapalus: the body of a horse (Freymond gave notice of this, crediting his friend S. Singer).) raped the fée (fairy) Brunehold (Note: "Brunehold" is given in Paris (P.) (1852), p. 537. "Burneholt" appears as heading in e.g., Walter, Philippe (2015), Dictionnaire de mythologie arthurienne. "Brunehaut" is used in J. Vannérus (1938). "Bruhan" in Le Roux de Lincy (1836), p. 253.) while she bathed in the fountain of Oricon. Although Chapalu was beautiful, his mother could not bear her shame and turned him into a hideously shaped monster, and this curse could only be lifted when he has sucked a few drops of Rainouart's blood. The description of Chapalu after his metamorphosis was that he had a cat's head with red eyes, a horse's body, a griffon's talons (or dragon's feet), and a lion's tail. Rainouart is then brought to Avalon by three fairies, and Arthur the king of Avalon commands Chapalu to fight this newcomer. In the ensuing battle, Chapalu laps some blood from his opponent's heel, and his human form is restored.

An incidental detail is that Sir Gawain, Sir Yvain, and Roland have also been spirited away into Avalon, as chattered by the three fays who abducted Rainouart, and also uttered by Arthur in the welcoming greeting. (Note: Since the subject of Loomis's study is Gawain, it is significant that Gawain figures in Loquifer and Jean d'Outremeuse, but is absent from the Alexandrine romance of Ogier.)

=== Ogier ===
The chanson de geste of Ogier the Dane were reworked into longer remaniements ("reworkings"; Italian: rifacimenti) in decasyllabic form (c. 1310) and alexandrines (c. 1335 ). In the decasyllabic Roman d'Ogier (c. 1310) summarized by Knud Togeby, the Capulu[s] was a knight transformed into a lutin by the fées, and he offers to become Ogier's squire. This is clearly borrowed from the Bataille Loquifer above, where the fays transport Rainouart to Avalon so he can aid Artus enbattling Chapalu a long time. The story is retained also in the Alexandrine version except the spelling is changed to Capulus, and the gist is the same in the prose romance, where Capulus given as the king of the lutins rather than some cat.

Ogier the Dane later appears in Jean d'Outremeuse's works, La Geste d'Ogier (c. 1375) and Ly Myreur des Histors (c. 1385) where he fights Chapalu that turns out to be the metamorphosis of his squire Benoit, or else the monster from which Benoit's soul must be liberated. The narrative is similar to Renoart's Avalon adventure in La Bataille Loquifer, and there is "no doubt" Jean knew the chanson in question.

According to the Myreur, Ogier was traveling in the year 896 to succor Guillaume d'Orange when he was shipwrecked with his horse Passevent on an isle (Ysle de Trist, nine days sailing from Cyprus), and combats with Chapalu (Capalu). A fight ensues between Ogier and beasts, including Chapalu, but this is actually Ogier's squire Benoit (or his soul) trapped in monster form due to enchantment, and Ogier is required to tap the creature between the eyes to lift the curse. Ogier subsequently fights Arthur and Gawain, until Arthur's sister Morgan is summoned by her son Auberon (Alberon) to stop the fight.

A similar narrative is incorporated into late reworked versions of the Ogier romance, except Gawain goes without mention.

== Iconography ==
The fight between Arthur and Cath Palug is figured on a mosaic at Otranto Cathedral in Italy (cf. top image). The creature believed to represent the Cath Palug/Capalus is a "black panther-like" "spotted feline", seeming to attack King Arthur (labeled rex Arturus) mounted on some horned animal (a goat), wearing a crown, and holding a club (or sceptre). The same feline is mauling a man on the ground beneath them. The crown on Arthur and the horns on the mounting beast appear to be artefacts of the restorer, based on preserved drawings of the mosaic from earlier.

== Local lore ==
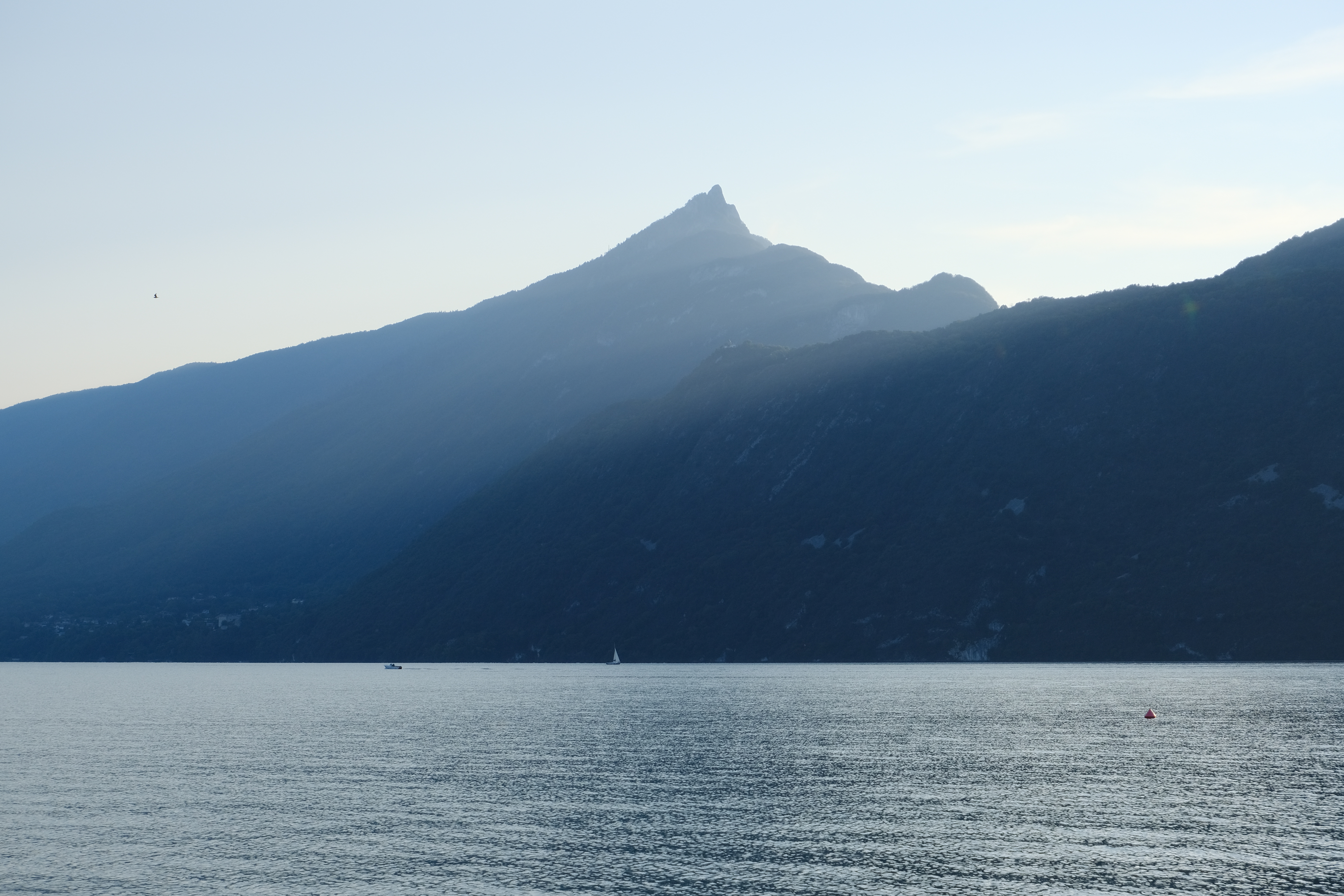
The Dent du Chat ('cat's tooth') peak of the Mont du Chat linked with the legend in popular folklore

The legend's fight between Arthur and the devil cat of the Lake of Lausanne (in present-day Switzerland) is now considered to have been located at the Col du Chat ('cat pass') in the Savoie region of France near Lake Bourget. This conforms with the account in the Estoire de Merlin that Arthur, in order to commemorate his victory over the cat, renamed a place that was called Mont du Lac ('lake mountain') as Mont du Chat ('cat mountain').

The modern rediscovery of the Arthurian lore here is credited to Emile Freymond, who initially searched for local tradition or onomastics around Lausanne, in vain, then crossing the border into France, and found this spot. The community still retained vestigial lore of encounters with the monstrous cat, though Arthur did not figure in them. There was also a piece of 13th-century writing by Etienne de Bourbon saying that King Arthur carried out a hunt at Mont du Chat.
