= Roundabout interchange =

Type of interchange between highways and minor roads

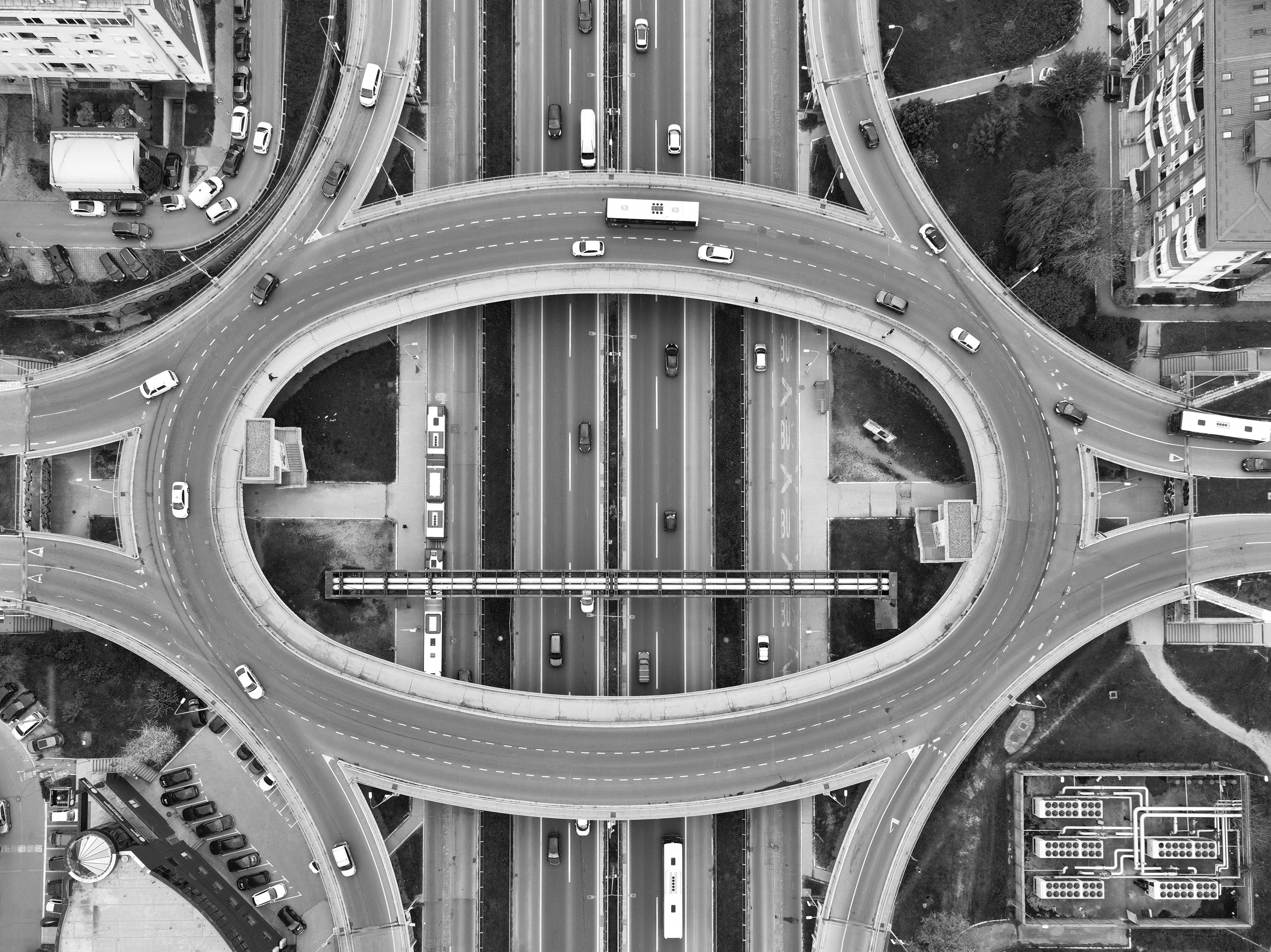
Roundabout interchange in Belgrade, Serbia

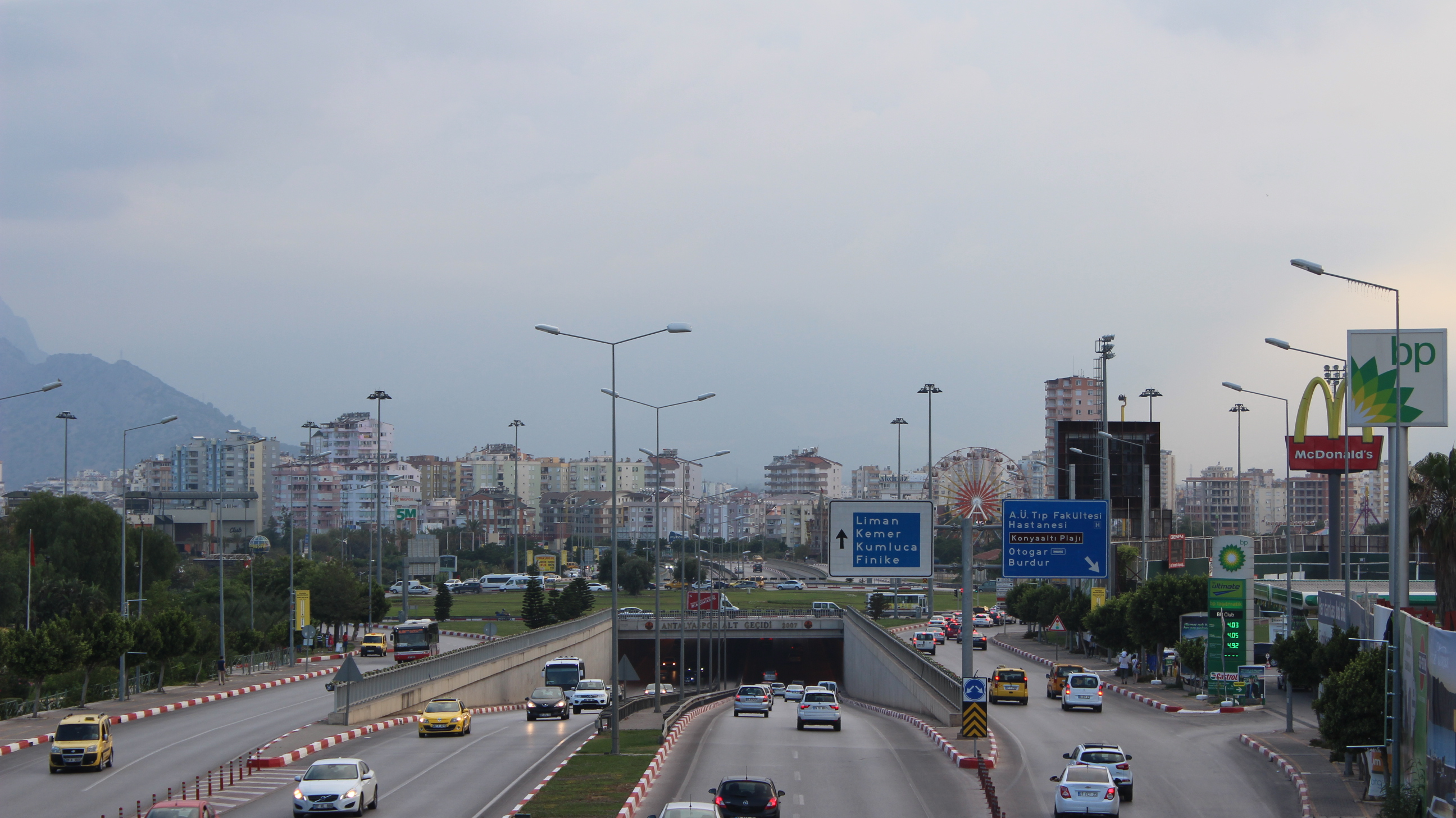
Antalyaspor Interchange of Antalya. The underpass serve the transit traffic of city center to Konyaaltı, while the upper part Dumlupınar Bulvarı and roundabout are maintained by General Directorate of Highways as D-400 Highway.

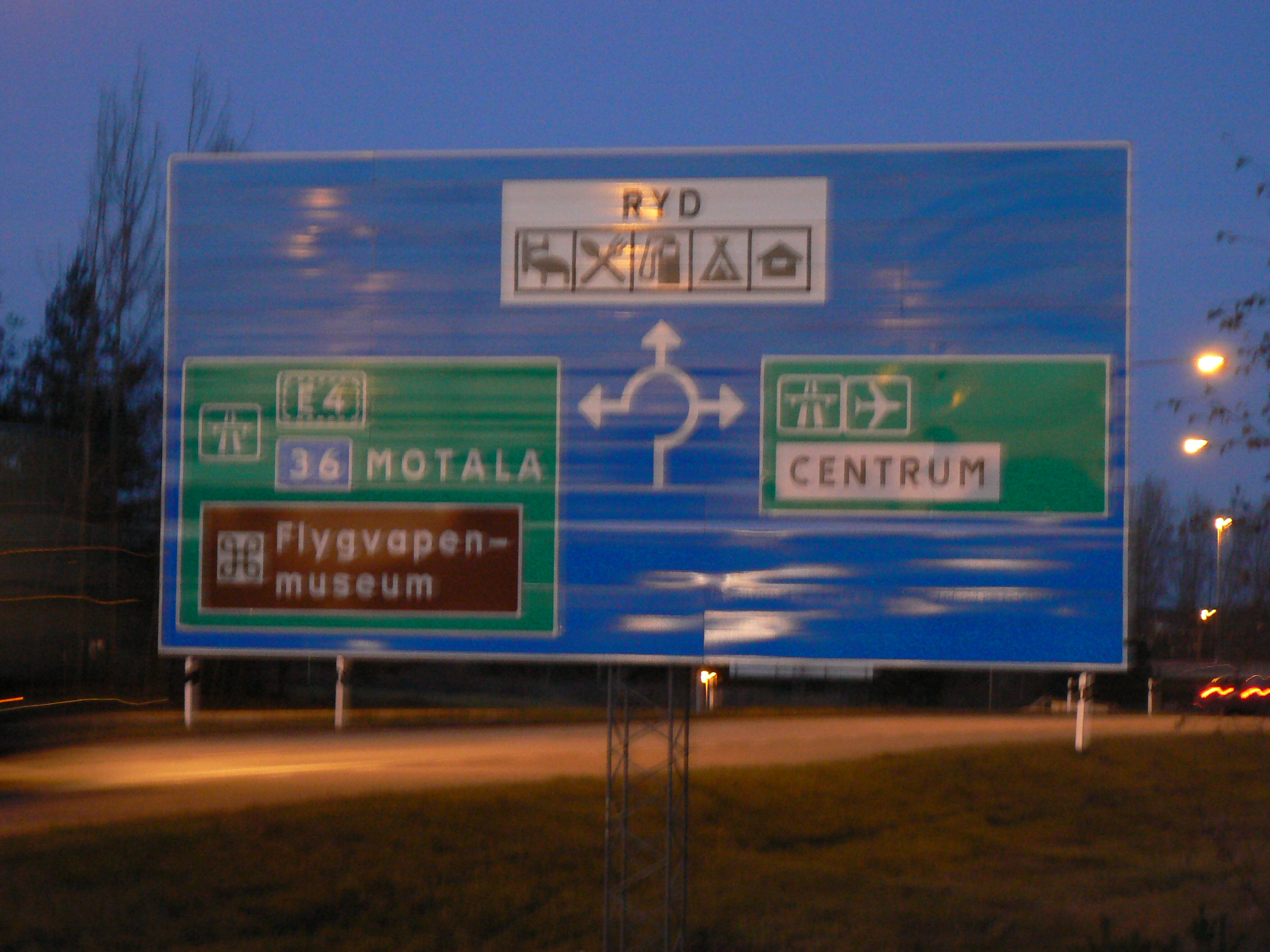
The western entryway into Linköping, Sweden (a branch off the backbone E4 highway) passes on a bridge above this roundabout, which connects a national road and a local road into a residential area with ramps leading up to the free-flowing road (note the green signage denoting that in these directions you are entering a motorway).

A roundabout interchange is a type of interchange between a controlled access highway, such as a motorway or freeway, and a minor road. The slip roads to and from the motorway carriageways converge at a single roundabout, which is grade-separated from the motorway lanes with bridges.

== Design ==
A roundabout interchange is similar to a rotary interchange, which uses a rotary rather than a roundabout. Roundabouts may also be used in conjunction with other interchange types such as a standard or folded diamond interchange, but such use should not be confused with a roundabout interchange.

Roundabout interchanges are extremely common in the United Kingdom and Ireland with hundreds on the motorway network alone. However, recent cost cutting has meant that dumbbell interchanges are increasingly used instead. These are essentially diamond interchanges with roundabouts instead of signals or stop signs where the slip roads meet the minor road. They are cheaper than roundabout interchanges as only one bridge is required instead of two.

Roundabout interchanges are much less common in North America but have been built more frequently since 1995, to improve safety, and to reduce traffic delays and bridge widening costs. However, many of the older and more dangerous rotary-style overpass interchanges have been signalized to improve throughput and safety, such as the former Drum Hill Rotary (now Drum Hill Square) in Chelmsford, Massachusetts, in New England, where such interchanges are unusually common.

A split diamond, in which the minor road is separated into four intersections, rather than two, also acts like a roundabout interchange, but it is more square in shape and, typically, has traffic light control.

== Examples ==
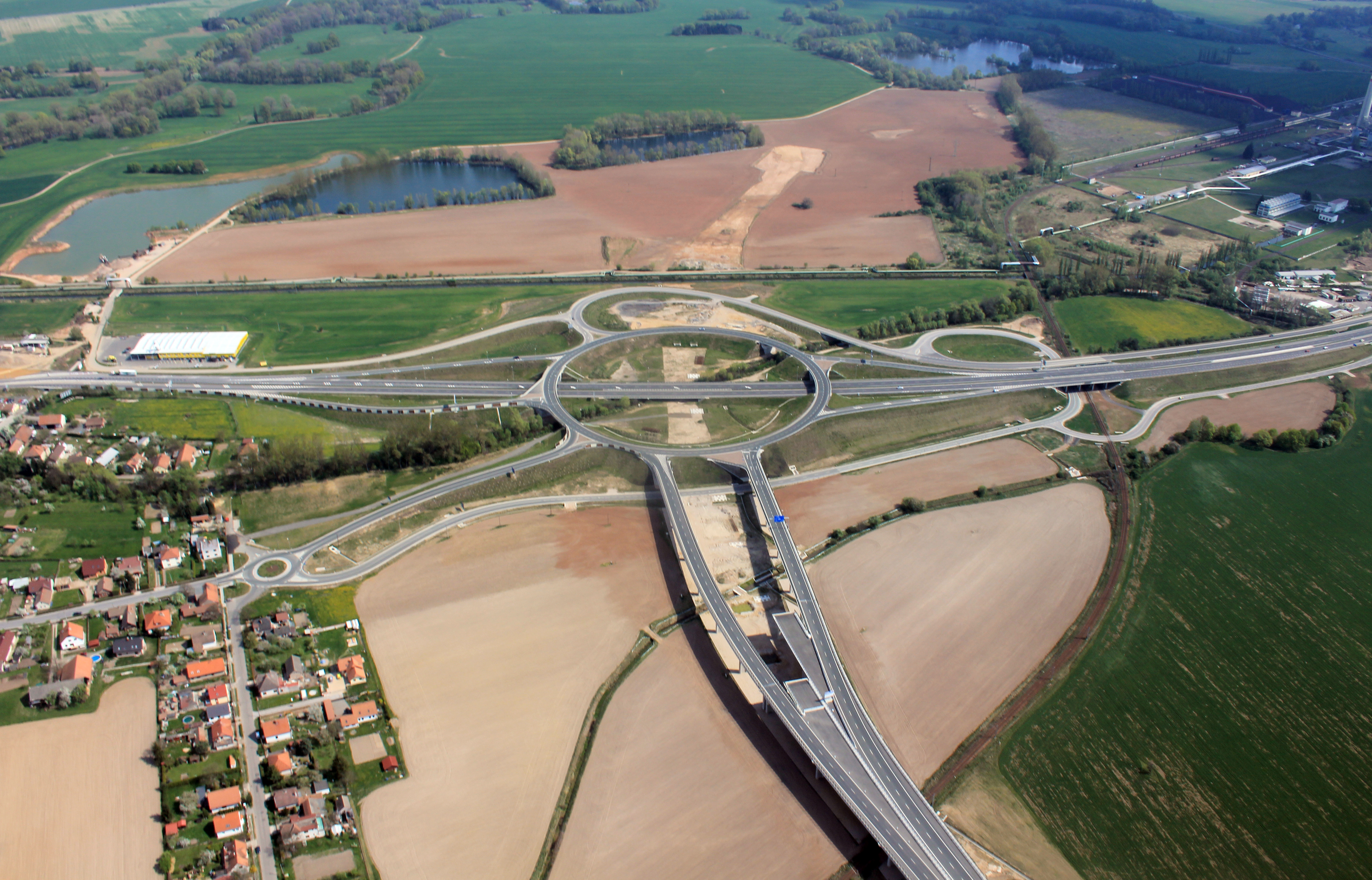
Two-level roundabout interchange between the D35 motorway and I/37 in the Czech Republic. Ramp stubs for a now-built flyover are visible.

- The junction of the M1, M69, and A4560 at Braunstone in England is an example of a British-style (in this case, partially signalized) roundabout interchange. 52.60056°N 1.19500°W
- Kinsale Road Roundabout south of Cork, Ireland, on the N40 South Ring Road at the N27 Airport Road is a signalized roundabout interchange.51.87361°N 8.47000°W
- New York State Route 201 and Riverside Drive, Johnson City, New York, has the roundabout to the side of the freeway with underpasses for the on and off ramps. 42.10694°N 75.96639°W
- Denham Roundabout (M40 and Oxford Road), Denham, Buckinghamshire, connects the motorway ramps to local streets using a large circular roadway containing multiple intersections, several of which are roundabouts. 51.56111°N 0.49583°W
- U.S. Route 9 and New York State Route 2, Latham, New York, is a roundabout interchange with U-turn lanes for the freeway. 42.74806°N 73.76083°W
- Dupont Circle, Washington, D.C., is a roundabout interchange between several local roads including Connecticut Avenue, NW, which passes underneath the roundabout.
- Washington Circle, in Foggy Bottom, Washington, D.C., is another example of a roundabout interchange similar to the one in Dupont Circle. Here, K Street traverses beneath the intersection.
- Échangeur de Villarcher, in Voglans near Chambéry is a rare example of roundabout interchange in France. It links two former national roads (D 1201 and D 1504), where D 1201 passes above the roundabout through a bridge. 45.616333°N 5.884056°E
- A roundabout is used as an interchange between Quebec Autoroute 20 and Quebec Autoroute 520 in Montreal, Quebec. The roundabout is known as the Dorval Circle. Ramps to side streets are added as well. The interchange is being replaced as of 2020.

== Three-level stacked roundabout ==
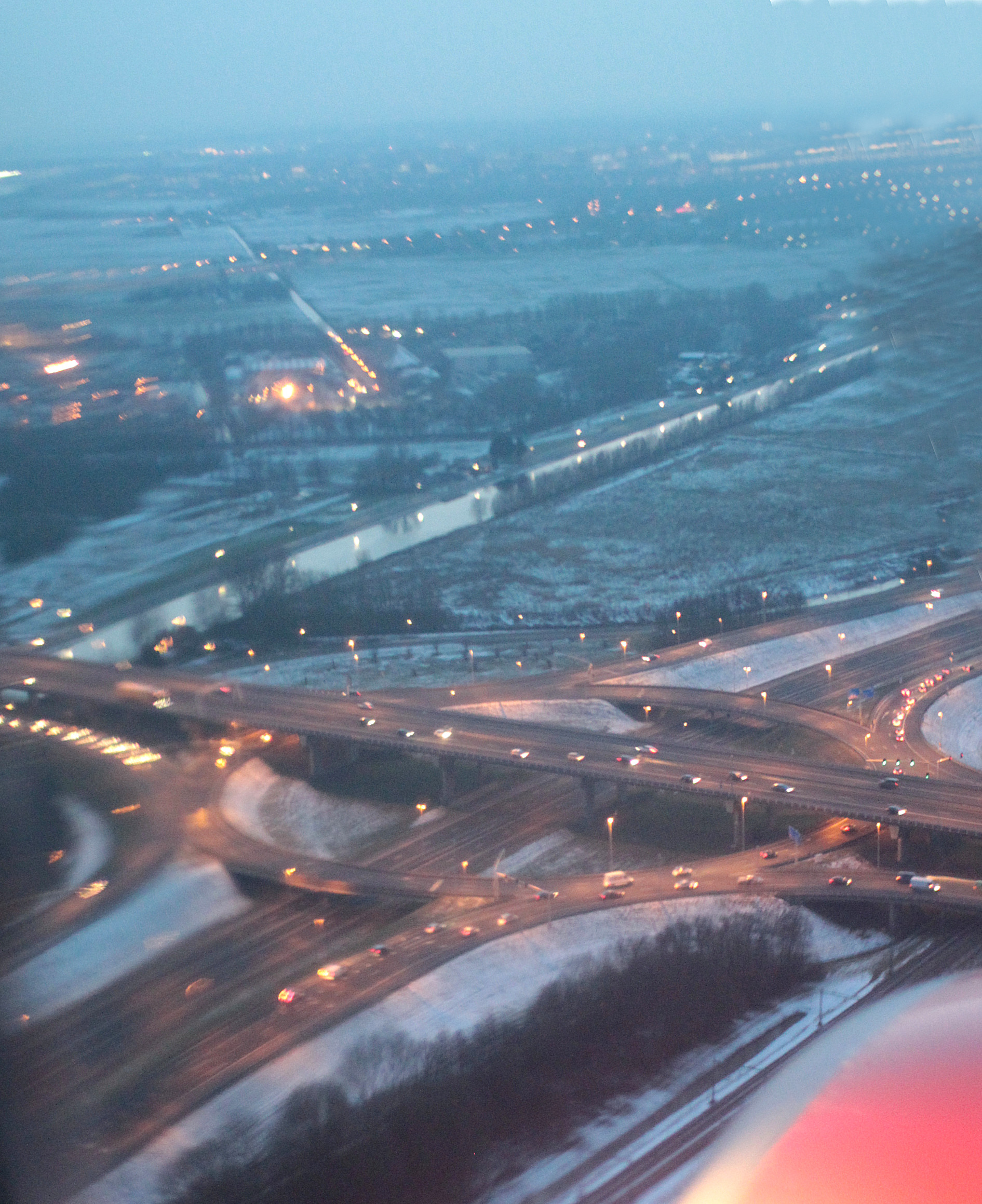
The Rottepolderplein in the Netherlands is a three-level roundabout.

The three-level stacked roundabout is a variation on the roundabout interchange in which both roads are grade-separated. It is similar to the three-level diamond interchange except that the small square of that latter interchange is enlarged to a true roundabout. If the roundabout is sufficiently large, the interchange may require only two levels.

- Causeway Boulevard (LA 3046) and Airline Highway (US 61), Metairie, Louisiana, has the traffic circle between the two roads. 29.97472°N 90.15639°W
- Staples Corner (A406 and A5), Dollis Hill, Greater London, has the roundabout on the ground. 51.57111°N 0.23194°W

Three-level stacked roundabouts are quite common in Britain because they use less land than other four-way junctions where both roads are grade separated. However, they have lower capacity for turning movements – some have had direct-linking slip roads added later in an attempt to solve this problem. Examples of such junctions are found at Lofthouse, West Yorkshire (M1/M62; 53.73194°N 1.51306°W) and Swanley, Kent (M20/M25; 51.38861°N 0.19389°E).
