= Henwen =

Sow in Welsh legend

Henwen, meaning "Old White", is in Welsh legend a sow (female pig) which according to the Welsh Triads gave birth to Cath Palug, a monstrous cat depicted as combating with either Cai (Sir Kay) or King Arthur of Arthurian Legends.

== Triads ==
According to the triad "Three Powerful Swineherds of the Isle of Britain", the sow was kept by one Coll, son of Collfrewy, a pigkeeper for Dallwyr Dallben (also spelt Dallweir). The variant Red Book of Hergest (RBH) and White Book of Rhydderch (WBR) texts add that the Dallwyr held a valley named after him, the Glen of Dallwyr in Cornwall. The sow was ready to give birth, but this boded ill for the Isle of Britain, according to prophecy, so she was chased until she plunged into the sea at Penrhyn Awstin in Cornwall. The sow eventually re-emerges on land at Aber Tarogi in Gwent Is-coed (a subdivision of Gwent).

=== Offspring ===
Subsequently, at various locales, the sow engenders various creatures as offspring, some bountiful, some baneful.

- At Wheat Field (Maes Gwenith) in Gwent, a grain of wheat and a bee
- At Llonion in Pembroke/Dyfed, a grain of barley and a bee (26)/ wheat (26W) / piglet (R=Guest)
- At Lleyn in Arfon, a grain o rye (RBH)
- At the Hill of Cyferthwch in Snowdonia (Eryri); a wolf-cub and eaglet
- At Llanfair in Arfon under the Black Rock (Maen Du), a kitten.

The wolf and eagle were adopted by eminent men but "they were both the worse for them". The swineherd took the kitten and cast in into the Menai Strait. Then on the isle of Anglesey (Welsh: Ynys Môn; or Mona), which is across the strait, the sons of Palug reared the cat which became the Cath Palug.

== Analysis ==
Don Carleton suggests that the tale of Henwen is an allegorical account of the harrying of a female religious leader across south-west Britain by Arthur.

== In popular culture ==
In The Chronicles of Prydain by Lloyd Alexander, Hen Wen is depicted as a clairvoyant pig kept by Dallben and Coll and looked after by Taran, the young protagonist of the series. Hen Wen also appears in The Black Cauldron (1985), the Walt Disney adaptation of the first two books in Alexander's series.

In The Seven Deadly Sins manga and anime there is a character, Hawk Mama, who is based on Henwen.

== See also ==
- Twrch Trwyth
