= Canton of La Motte-Servolex =

Coordinates: 45.60°N 5.87°E

The canton of La Motte-Servolex is an administrative division of the Savoie department, southeastern France. Its borders were modified at the French canton reorganisation which came into effect in March 2015. Its seat is in La Motte-Servolex.

It consists of the following communes:

1. Bourdeau
2. Le Bourget-du-Lac
3. La Chapelle-du-Mont-du-Chat
4. Drumettaz-Clarafond
5. Méry
6. La Motte-Servolex
7. Viviers-du-Lac
8. Voglans
