= Méry =

Méry Mayri (Savoyard)
- Commune
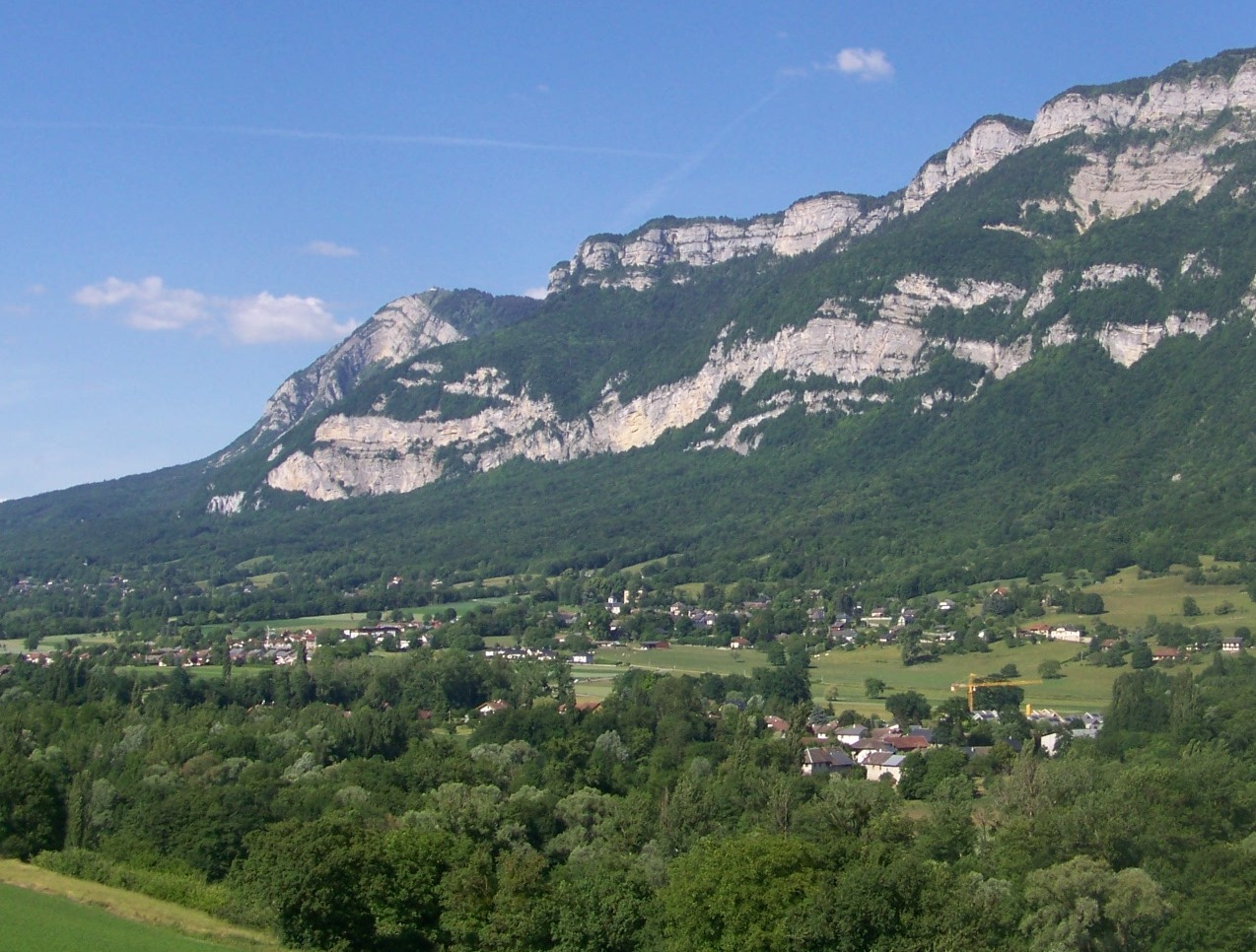
- Hamlets within Méry
- Location of Méry
- Location within France Location within Auvergne-Rhône-Alpes
- Coordinates: 45°38′35″N 5°56′21″E
- Country: France
- Region: Auvergne-Rhône-Alpes
- Department: Savoie
- Arrondissement: Chambéry
- Canton: La Motte-Servolex
- Intercommunality: CA Grand Lac

Government
  - Mayor (2020–2026): Nathalie Fontaine
- Area^{1}: 9.07 km^{2} (3.50 sq mi)
- Highest elevation: 1,000 m (3,300 ft)
- Lowest elevation: 272 m (892 ft)
- Population (2023): 2,150
  - Density: 237/km^{2} (614/sq mi)
- Time zone: UTC+01:00 (CET)
  - Summer (DST): UTC+02:00 (CEST)
- INSEE/Postal code: 73155 /73420
- Website: www.mery73.fr
- ^{1} French Land Register data, which excludes lakes, ponds, glaciers > 1 km^{2} (0.386 sq mi or 247 acres) and river estuaries.

Méry (French pronunciation: [meʁi]; Savoyard: Mayri) is a commune in the Savoie department in the Auvergne-Rhône-Alpes region in south-eastern France. It is part of the urban area of Chambéry.

== Population ==
Historical population
Year	Pop.	±% p.a.
1968	410	—
1975	391	−0.68%
1982	591	+6.08%
1990	666	+1.50%
1999	1,183	+6.59%
2007	1,287	+1.06%
2012	1,539	+3.64%
2017	1,803	+3.22%
2023	2,150	+2.98%
Source: INSEE

== See also ==
- Communes of the Savoie department
