= La Motte-Servolex =

La Motte-Servolex La Mota-Cèrvolê (Arpitan)
- Commune
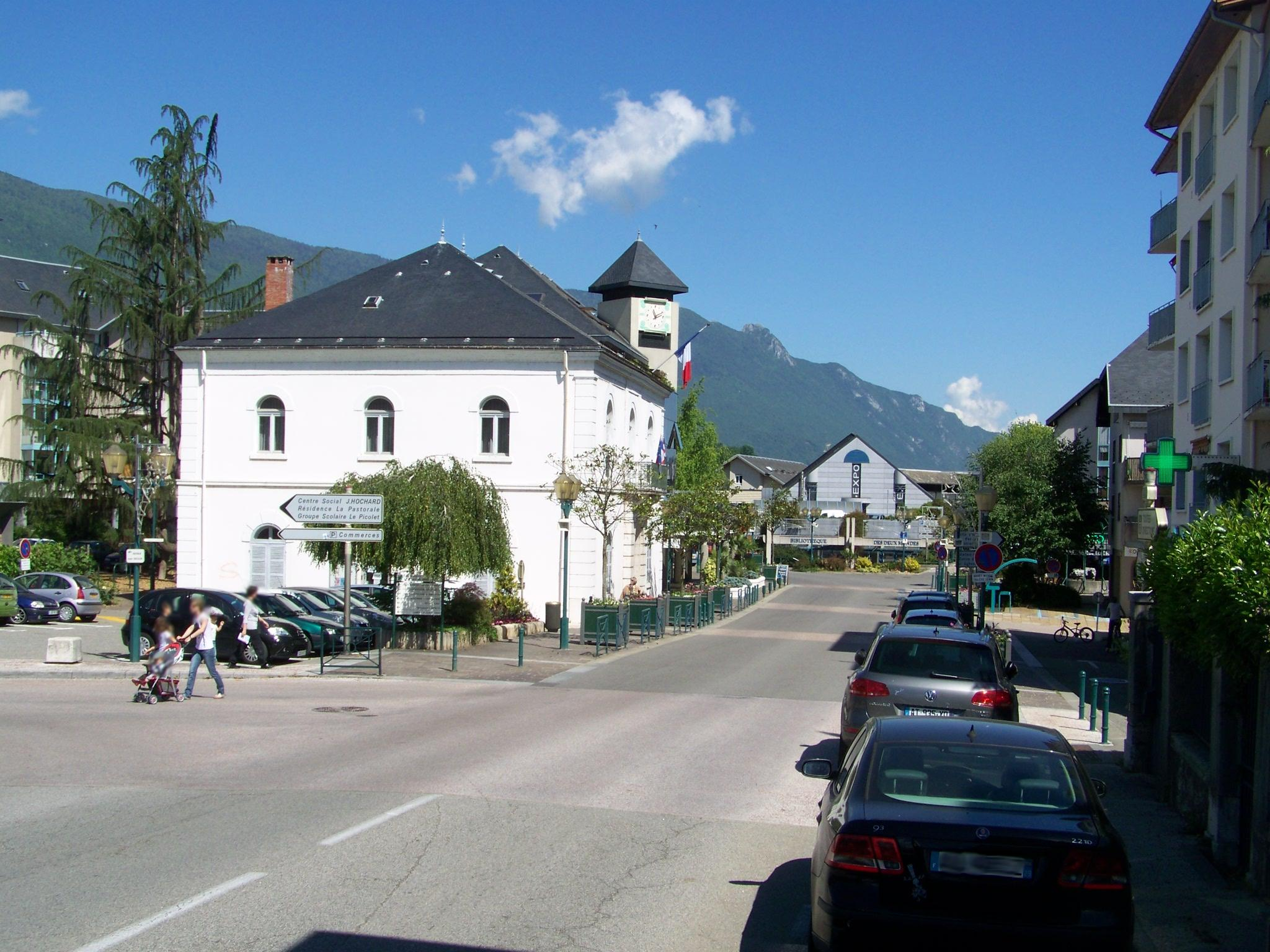
- The centre of La Motte-Servolex

- Coat of arms
- Location of La Motte-Servolex
- Location within France Location within Auvergne-Rhône-Alpes
- Coordinates: 45°35′51″N 5°52′42″E
- Country: France
- Region: Auvergne-Rhône-Alpes
- Department: Savoie
- Arrondissement: Chambéry
- Canton: La Motte-Servolex
- Intercommunality: Grand Chambéry

Government
  - Mayor (2020–2026): Luc Berthoud
- Area^{1}: 29.85 km^{2} (11.53 sq mi)
- Highest elevation: 1,440 m (4,720 ft)
- Lowest elevation: 232 m (761 ft)
- Population (2023): 12,067
  - Density: 404.3/km^{2} (1,047/sq mi)
- Time zone: UTC+01:00 (CET)
  - Summer (DST): UTC+02:00 (CEST)
- INSEE/Postal code: 73179 /73290
- Website: www.mairie-lamotteservolex.fr
- ^{1} French Land Register data, which excludes lakes, ponds, glaciers > 1 km^{2} (0.386 sq mi or 247 acres) and river estuaries.

La Motte-Servolex (French pronunciation: [la mɔt sɛʁvɔlɛks]; Arpitan: La Mota-Cèrvolê) is a commune in the Savoie department in the Auvergne-Rhône-Alpes region in south-eastern France. It is part of the urban area of Chambéry.

== Geography ==
=== Climate ===
La Motte-Servolex has a humid continental climate (Köppen climate classification Cfb) closely bordering on a humid subtropical climate (Cfa). The average annual temperature in La Motte-Servolex is 11.9 °C (53.4 °F). The average annual rainfall is 1,391.8 mm (54.80 in) with October as the wettest month. The temperatures are highest on average in July, at around 21.2 °C (70.2 °F), and lowest in January, at around 2.5 °C (36.5 °F). The highest temperature ever recorded in La Motte-Servolex was 39.7 °C (103.5 °F) on 12 August 2003; the coldest temperature ever recorded was −18.0 °C (−0.4 °F) on 7 January 1985.

Climate data for La Motte-Servolex (1981−2010 normals, extremes 1984−2015)
| Month | Jan | Feb | Mar | Apr | May | Jun | Jul | Aug | Sep | Oct | Nov | Dec | Year |
|---|---|---|---|---|---|---|---|---|---|---|---|---|---|
| Record high °C (°F) | 16.6 (61.9) | 20.6 (69.1) | 26.0 (78.8) | 29.2 (84.6) | 33.1 (91.6) | 36.7 (98.1) | 37.9 (100.2) | 39.7 (103.5) | 31.3 (88.3) | 29.2 (84.6) | 21.8 (71.2) | 21.5 (70.7) | 39.7 (103.5) |
| Mean daily maximum °C (°F) | 5.6 (42.1) | 8.3 (46.9) | 12.9 (55.2) | 16.5 (61.7) | 21.2 (70.2) | 24.7 (76.5) | 27.2 (81.0) | 26.7 (80.1) | 22.1 (71.8) | 16.9 (62.4) | 9.9 (49.8) | 6.0 (42.8) | 16.5 (61.7) |
| Daily mean °C (°F) | 2.5 (36.5) | 4.3 (39.7) | 7.9 (46.2) | 11.1 (52.0) | 15.7 (60.3) | 18.9 (66.0) | 21.2 (70.2) | 20.8 (69.4) | 16.9 (62.4) | 12.7 (54.9) | 6.6 (43.9) | 3.2 (37.8) | 11.9 (53.4) |
| Mean daily minimum °C (°F) | −0.6 (30.9) | 0.3 (32.5) | 2.9 (37.2) | 5.7 (42.3) | 10.1 (50.2) | 13.1 (55.6) | 15.2 (59.4) | 14.9 (58.8) | 11.6 (52.9) | 8.4 (47.1) | 3.4 (38.1) | 0.4 (32.7) | 7.2 (45.0) |
| Record low °C (°F) | −18.0 (−0.4) | −13.5 (7.7) | −9.0 (15.8) | −4.0 (24.8) | 0.5 (32.9) | 4.0 (39.2) | 7.0 (44.6) | 6.2 (43.2) | 2.6 (36.7) | −2.6 (27.3) | −9.0 (15.8) | −11.3 (11.7) | −18.0 (−0.4) |
| Average precipitation mm (inches) | 124.0 (4.88) | 111.1 (4.37) | 112.4 (4.43) | 110.1 (4.33) | 111.7 (4.40) | 111.2 (4.38) | 97.3 (3.83) | 106.6 (4.20) | 124.0 (4.88) | 129.5 (5.10) | 125.3 (4.93) | 128.6 (5.06) | 1,391.8 (54.80) |
| Average precipitation days (≥ 1.0 mm) | 10.5 | 9.3 | 10.6 | 10.9 | 11.6 | 10.3 | 8.2 | 9.5 | 8.8 | 11.0 | 11.0 | 10.6 | 122.3 |
Source: Météo-France

== Population ==
Historical population
| Year | Pop. | ±% p.a. |
|---|---|---|
| 1968 | 3,281 | — |
| 1975 | 5,253 | +6.95% |
| 1982 | 7,182 | +4.57% |
| 1990 | 9,349 | +3.35% |
| 1999 | 10,912 | +1.73% |
| 2007 | 11,423 | +0.57% |
| 2012 | 11,452 | +0.05% |
| 2017 | 11,826 | +0.64% |
| 2023 | 12,067 | +0.34% |
Source: INSEE

== See also ==
- Communes of the Savoie department
