= Dent du Chat =

Mountain in Savoie, France

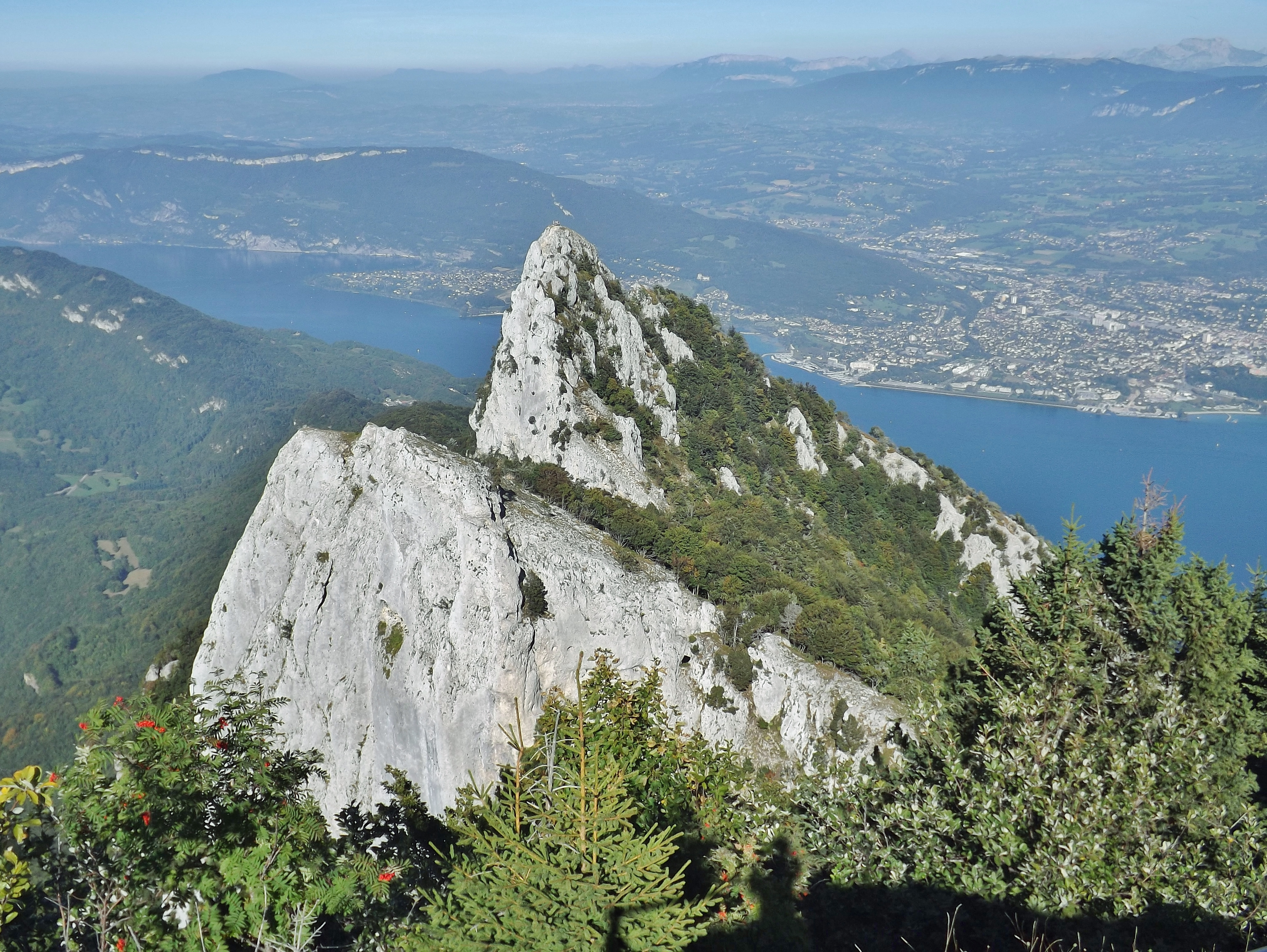
- View of dent du Chat from Molard Noir mountain, with lac du Bourget and Aix-les-Bains in the background.

Highest point
- Elevation: 1,390 m (4,560 ft)
- Coordinates: 45°40′28″N 05°50′04″E

Geography
- Location within France
- Location: Savoie, France
- Parent range: Jura

Dent du Chat (cat's tooth) is a mountain of Savoie, France. It lies in the Jura range. It has an elevation of 1,390 metres (4,560 ft) above sea level.
