= Voglans =

Voglans Voglyan (Savoyard)
- Commune
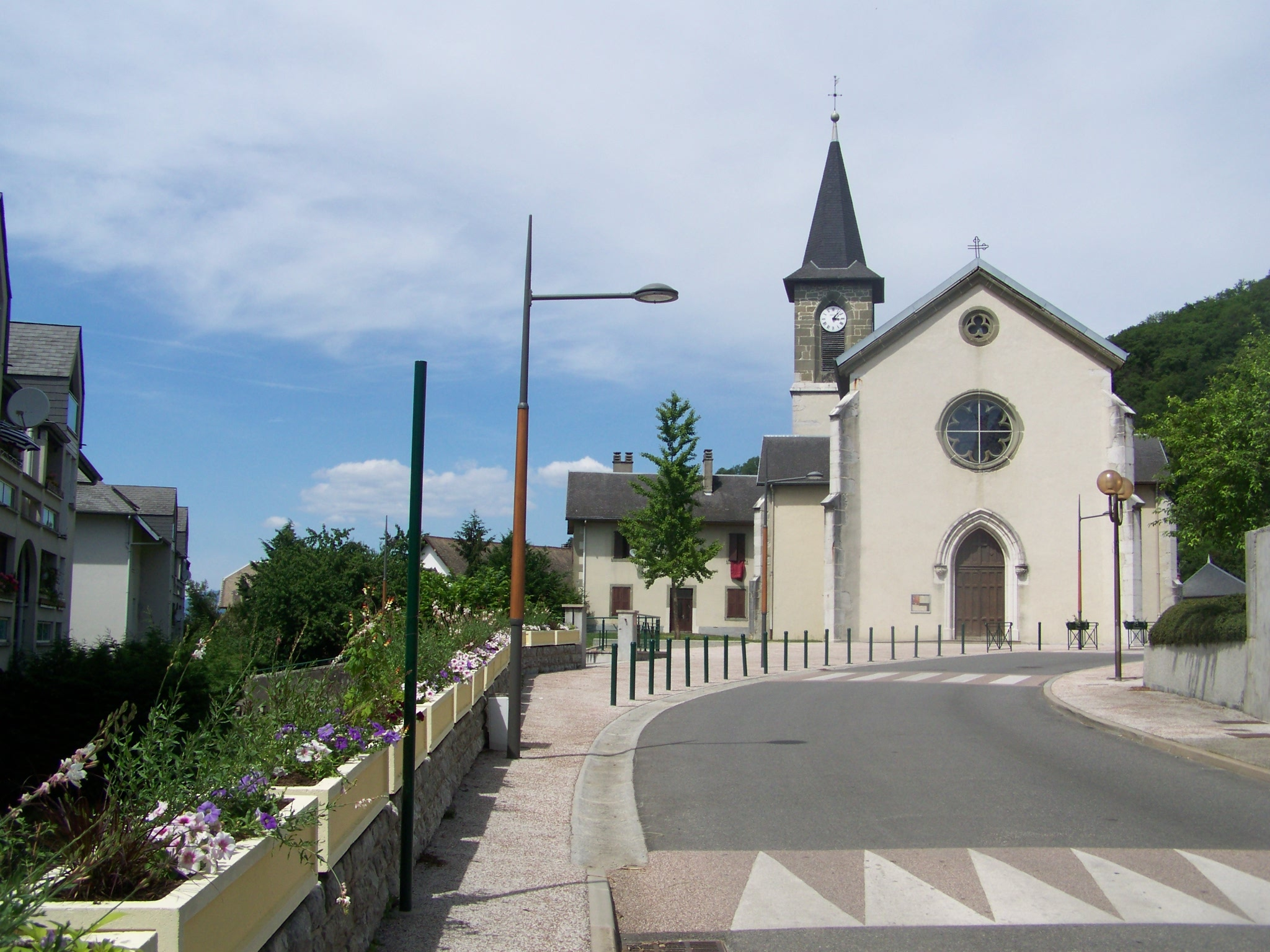
- The church in Voglans
- Location of Voglans
- Location within France Location within Auvergne-Rhône-Alpes
- Coordinates: 45°38′01″N 5°53′47″E
- Country: France
- Region: Auvergne-Rhône-Alpes
- Department: Savoie
- Arrondissement: Chambéry
- Canton: La Motte-Servolex
- Intercommunality: CA Grand Lac

Government
  - Mayor (2020–2026): Yves Mercier
- Area^{1}: 4.62 km^{2} (1.78 sq mi)
- Highest elevation: 392 m (1,286 ft)
- Lowest elevation: 231 m (758 ft)
- Population (2023): 2,021
  - Density: 437/km^{2} (1,130/sq mi)
- Time zone: UTC+01:00 (CET)
  - Summer (DST): UTC+02:00 (CEST)
- INSEE/Postal code: 73329 /73420
- Website: www.mairie-voglans.fr
- ^{1} French Land Register data, which excludes lakes, ponds, glaciers > 1 km^{2} (0.386 sq mi or 247 acres) and river estuaries.

Voglans (French pronunciation: [vɔɡlɑ̃]; Savoyard: Voglyan) is a commune in the French department of Savoie, Auvergne-Rhône-Alpes, southeastern France. It is part of the urban area of Chambéry.

== Population ==
Historical population
Year	Pop.	±% p.a.
1968	824	—
1975	831	+0.12%
1982	898	+1.11%
1990	1,015	+1.54%
1999	1,447	+4.02%
2007	1,650	+1.65%
2012	1,724	+0.88%
2017	1,897	+1.93%
2023	2,021	+1.06%
Source: INSEE

== Presidential election results ==
French presidential election 2022 in voglans
Candidate	Round 1		Round 2		Party
Presidential	Votes	%	Votes	%	
Emmanuel Macron	362	32.94%	614	59.67%	LREM)
Marine Le Pen	282	25.66%	415	40.33%	RN
Jean-Luc Mélenchon	183	16.65%			LFI
Éric Zemmour	86	7.83%			Reconquête
Valérie Pécresse	46	4.19%			LR
Yannick Jadot	40	3.64%			The Ecologists
Jean Lassalle	35	3.18%			Résistons
Nicolas Dupont-Aignan	20	1.82%			Debout la France
Anne Hidalgo	19	1.73%			PS
Fabien Roussel	16	1.46%			PCF
Philippe Poutou	8	0.73%			New Anticapitalist Party
Nathalie Arthaud	2	0.18%			Lutte Ouvrière

== See also ==
- Communes of the Savoie department
