= Molard Noir =

Mountain in Savoie, France

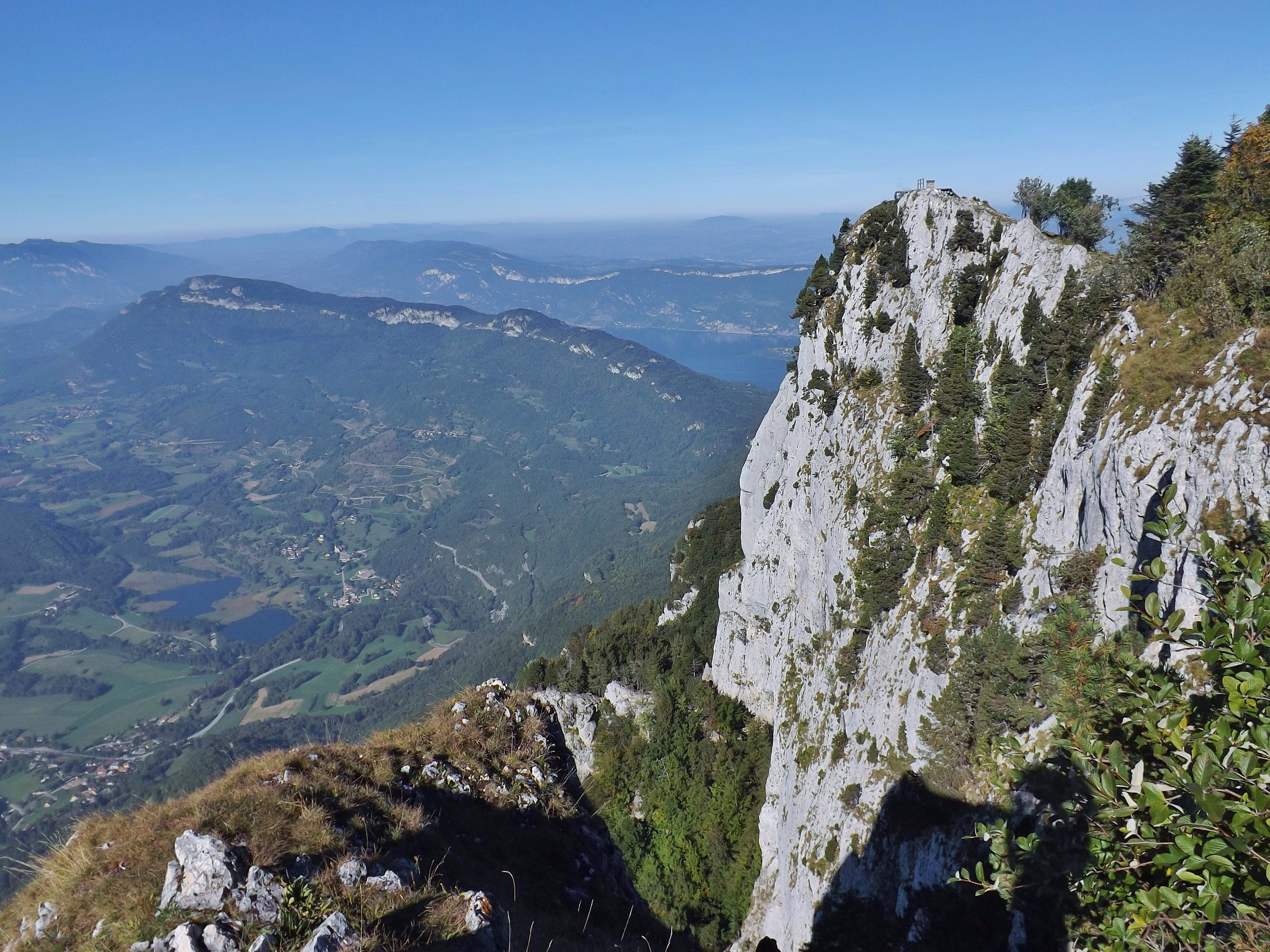

Highest point
- Elevation: 1,452 m (4,764 ft)
- Coordinates: 45°40′20″N 05°49′56″E

Geography
- Location within Savoie Location within France
- Country: France
- Region: Rhône-Alpes
- Department: Savoie
- Parent range: Jura

Molard Noir is a mountain of Savoie, France. It lies in the Jura range. It has an elevation of 1,452 metres (4,764 ft) above sea level.
