= Signal du Mont du Chat =

Mountain in France

Coordinates: 45.661°N 5.821°E

The Signal du Mont du Chat is a mountain in the Jura Mountains with an altitude of 1,504 metres, in France. It is situated in Savoie, west of Le Bourget-du-Lac.

== Tour de France ==
The climb of the Mont du Chat is rarely used in the Tour de France, so far only in 1974 and 2017. In 2017 it was classified as an hors catégorie climb, with a length of 8.7 km à 10.3%.

During the 2017 Critérium du Dauphiné the Mont du Chat was included in stage 6. Fabio Aru was the first over the top, while Jakob Fuglsang won the stage before Richie Porte who kept his lead in the general classification. A month later, during the 2017 Tour de France, Warren Barguil was the first rider over the top of the col. In the descent, there was a heavy crash by Porte who broke his clavicle and pelvis and had to withdraw from the race. Rigoberto Urán won the stage, with Chris Froome keeping the yellow jersey.

Year	Stage	Start of stage	Distance (km)	Category	First over the top	Stage winner	Yellow jersey
2017	9	Nantua	181.5	HC	Warren Barguil (FRA)	Rigoberto Urán (COL)	Chris Froome (GBR)
1974	10	Aix-les-Bains	131	2	Gonzalo Aja (ESP)	Eddy Merckx (BEL)	Eddy Merckx (BEL)
