= Bourdeau =

Bourdeau Bordyô (Savoyard)
- Commune
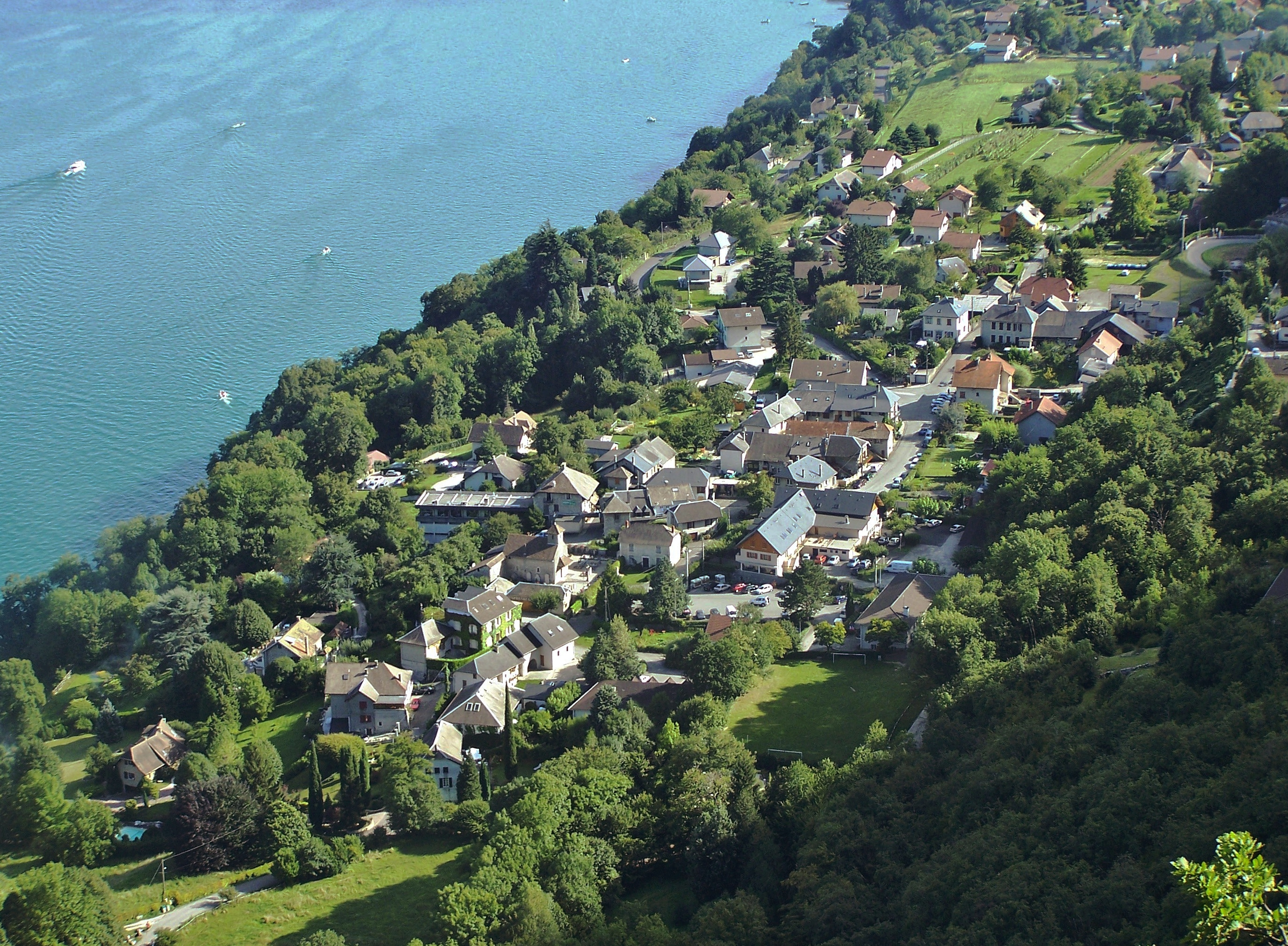
- Bourdeau seen from the road to col du Chat pass.
- Location of Bourdeau
- Location within France Location within Auvergne-Rhône-Alpes
- Coordinates: 45°40′49″N 5°51′19″E
- Country: France
- Region: Auvergne-Rhône-Alpes
- Department: Savoie
- Arrondissement: Chambéry
- Canton: La Motte-Servolex
- Intercommunality: CA Grand Lac

Government
  - Mayor (2020–2026): Jean-Marc Drivet
- Area^{1}: 4.83 km^{2} (1.86 sq mi)
- Highest elevation: 1,460 m (4,790 ft)
- Lowest elevation: 228 m (748 ft)
- Population (2023): 572
  - Density: 118/km^{2} (307/sq mi)
- Demonym: Bourdelais / Bourdelaises
- Time zone: UTC+01:00 (CET)
  - Summer (DST): UTC+02:00 (CEST)
- INSEE/Postal code: 73050 /73370
- ^{1} French Land Register data, which excludes lakes, ponds, glaciers > 1 km^{2} (0.386 sq mi or 247 acres) and river estuaries.

Bourdeau (French pronunciation: [buʁdo]; Arpitan: Bordyô) is a commune situated in the Savoie department and in the Auvergne-Rhône-Alpes region, in south-eastern France. It is part of the urban area of Chambéry.

== See also ==
- Communes of the Savoie department

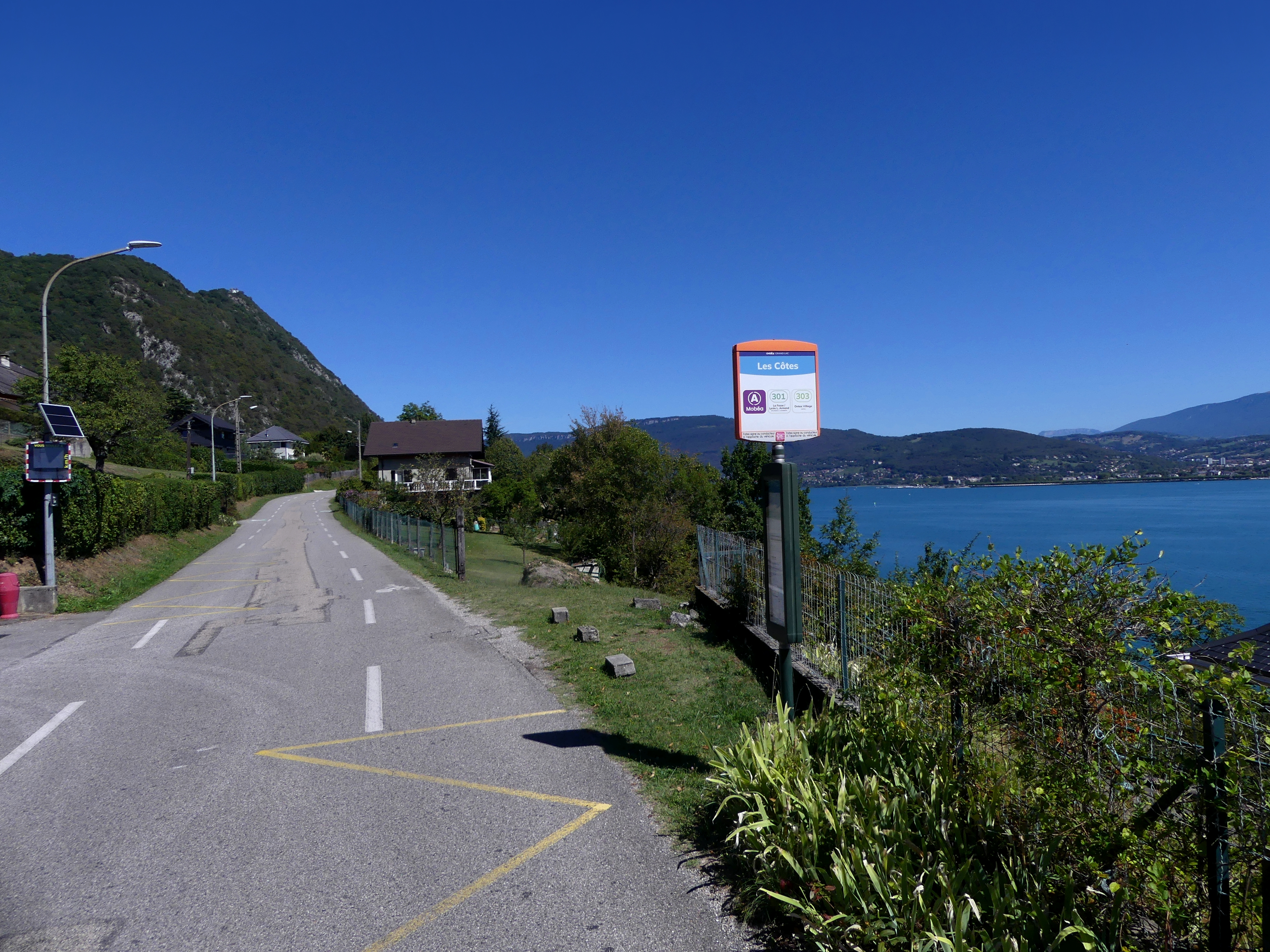
Sight of the road leading to Bourdeau.
