= Saint-Jean-de-Chevelu =

Saint-Jean-de-Chevelu Shvèlu (Savoyard)
- Commune
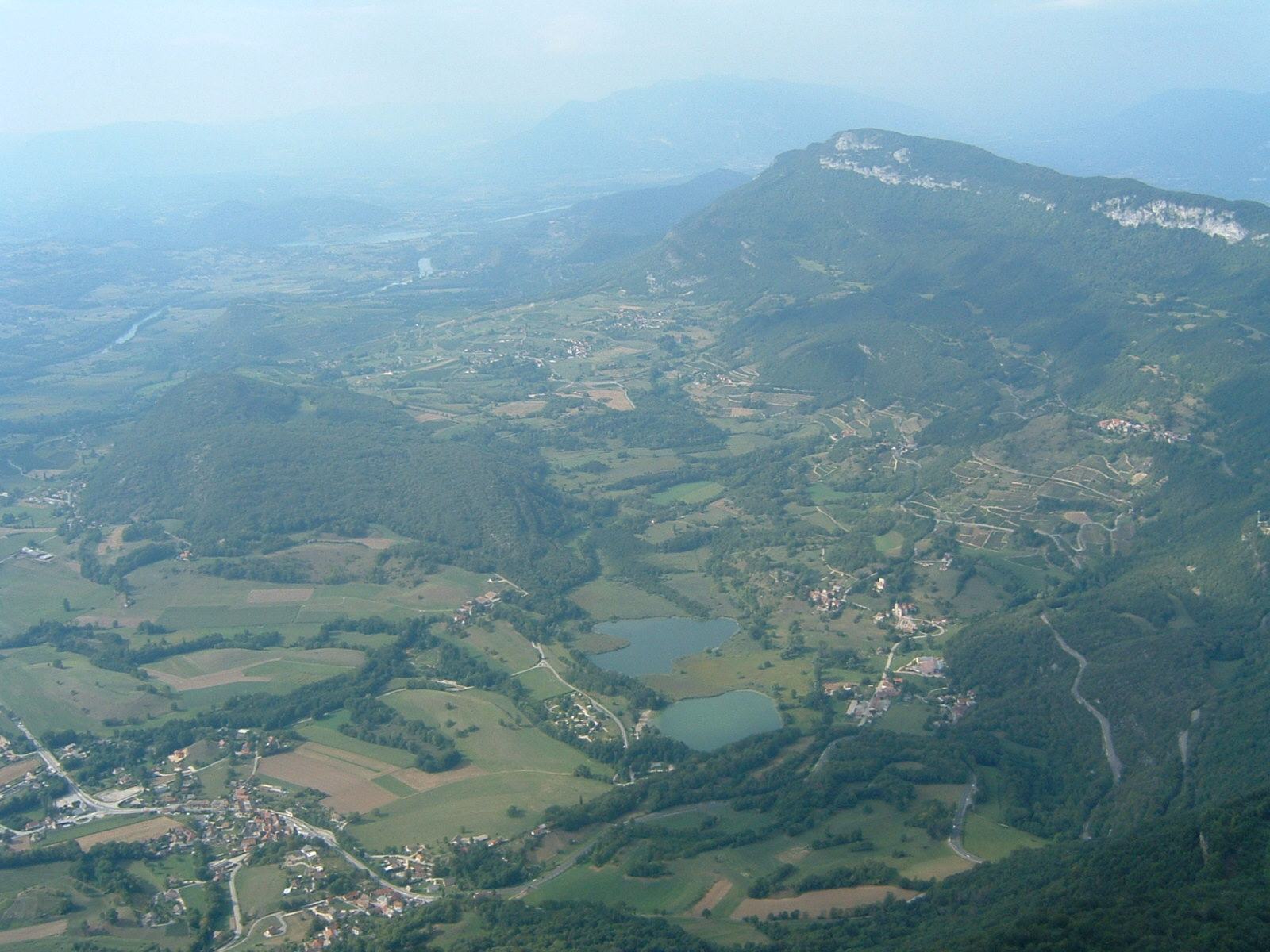
- Saint-Jean-de-Chevelu seen from the nearby mountainside
- Location of Saint-Jean-de-Chevelu
- Location within France Location within Auvergne-Rhône-Alpes
- Coordinates: 45°41′48″N 5°49′52″E
- Country: France
- Region: Auvergne-Rhône-Alpes
- Department: Savoie
- Arrondissement: Chambéry
- Canton: Bugey savoyard
- Intercommunality: Yenne

Government
  - Mayor (2020–2026): Virginie Girod
- Area^{1}: 12.72 km^{2} (4.91 sq mi)
- Highest elevation: 1,443 m (4,734 ft)
- Lowest elevation: 295 m (968 ft)
- Population (2023): 834
  - Density: 65.6/km^{2} (170/sq mi)
- Time zone: UTC+01:00 (CET)
  - Summer (DST): UTC+02:00 (CEST)
- INSEE/Postal code: 73245 /73170
- ^{1} French Land Register data, which excludes lakes, ponds, glaciers > 1 km^{2} (0.386 sq mi or 247 acres) and river estuaries.

Saint-Jean-de-Chevelu (French pronunciation: [sɛ̃ ʒɑ̃ də ʃəvly]; Savoyard: Shvèlu) is a commune in the Savoie department in the Auvergne-Rhône-Alpes region in south-eastern France.

== See also ==
- Communes of the Savoie department
