= Musée des Beaux-Arts de Chambéry =

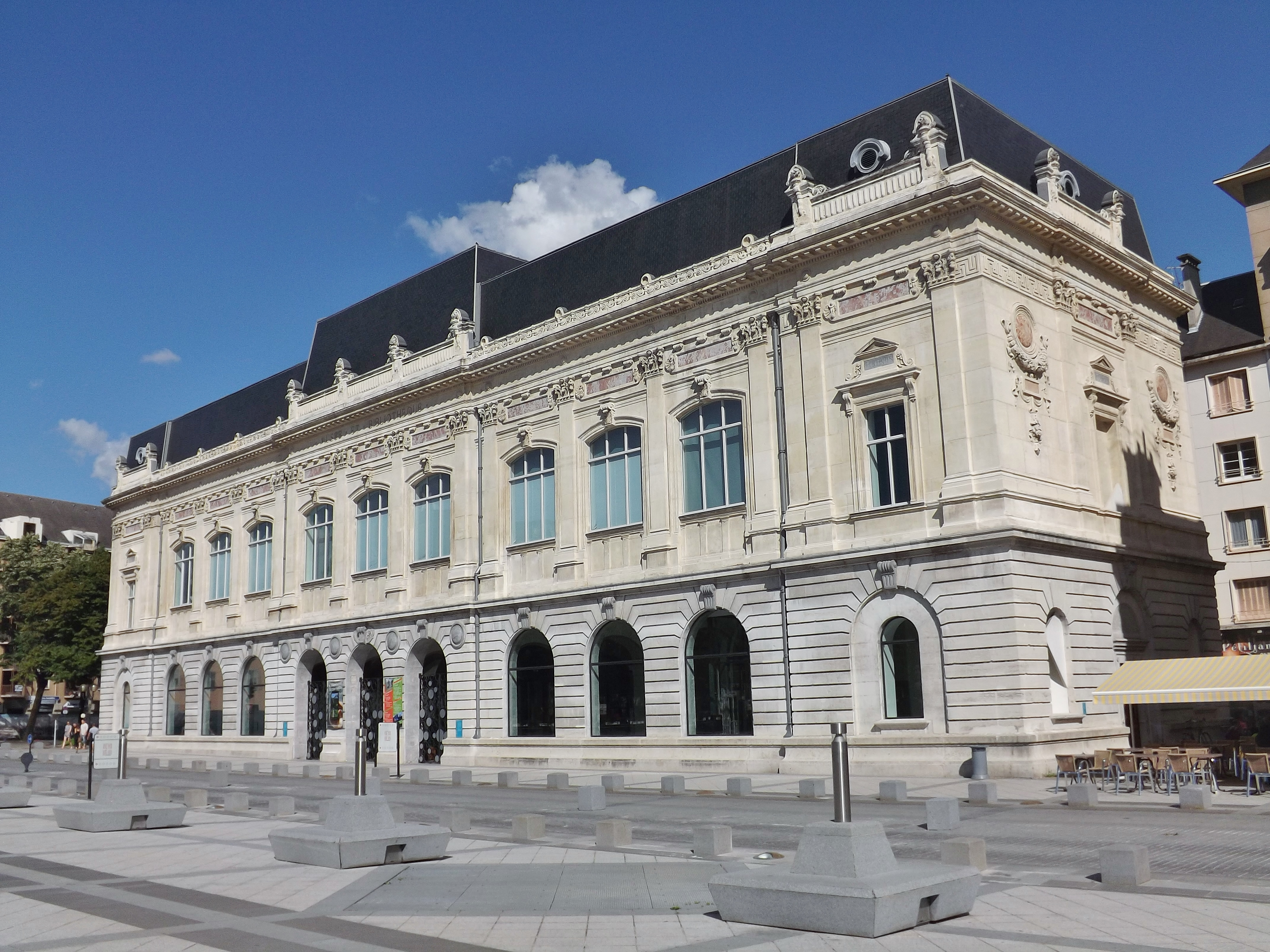
- Musée des Beaux-Arts de Chambéry in July 2013

- Location within France
- Location: Chambéry, Savoie, France
- Coordinates: 45.568248°N 5.919623°E
- Type: Art museum
- Website: musees.chambery.fr/387-musee-des-beaux-arts.htm

The Musée des Beaux-Arts de Chambéry is an art museum in Chambéry, Savoie, France.

== Foundation ==
The town of Chambéry had a collection of art in one of the rooms of the Hôtel de Ville (city hall), open to the public in 1783. This first collection was expanded during the 19th century. Hector Garriod Baron (1803–1883) gave 104 paintings to the town between 1863 and 1878. When he died, 140 works from his collection were bequeathed on condition that they be assembled in a museum. The municipality charged the architect François Pelaz with converting the former granary at the entrance to the town into the new museum. The people of Chambéry had been invited to talk about the annexation of Savoy to France (1860 Treaty of Turin) on the ground floor of this building. The library was inaugurated on 14 July 1889 to celebrate the 100th anniversary of the founding of the department in the French Revolution.

== History ==
From this starting point, the municipality continued to collect and safeguard works of art. In 1905 it bought the domain of Charmettes, the childhood home of Jean-Jacques Rousseau. In 1911 the Musée Savoisien was established in the buildings of the bishop's palace, awarded to the city following the law of separation of Church and State. In 1958 some work was undertaken by the conservator Pierre Amiet. The library was relocated in 1992 to make more space for exhibiting the collections, but the building had deteriorated over the years. The municipality decided to renovate the museum, with the work completed by the start of 2012. The cost was mostly covered by the town with some funding from the state. The renovated museum was open in March 2012, and officially opened on 23 November 2012.

== Today ==
The main focus of the collections is Italian painting of the 14th to 18th centuries. Of note is an outstanding altarpiece of the Trinity by Bartolo di Fredi, a Sienese artist of the fourteenth century. There is also a good presentation of trends in Mannerism, the Caravaggisti and the Baroque. Florentine art predominates, including the triptych of the Passion by Domenico di Michelino and the famous Portrait of a Young Man by Paolo Uccello, as well as several works by Santi di Tito and Ghirlandaio. The Venetian, Neapolitan and Bolognese schools are also represented. The museum has one of the richest collections in France of Italian works from such schools as those of Venice, Florence, Naples and Siena, which may be explained by the history of Savoy, lying between France and Italy. There is also a good collection of classical French works and some mountain landscapes of the 19th century. There is a large open space for temporary exhibitions.

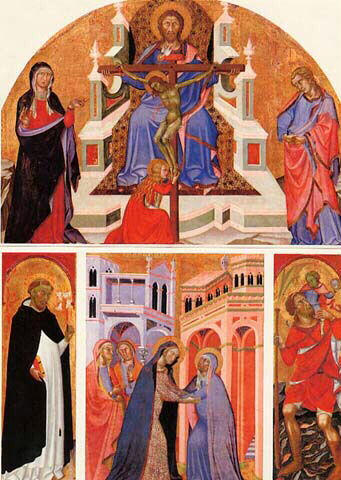
Altarpiece of the Trinity by Bartolo di Fredi

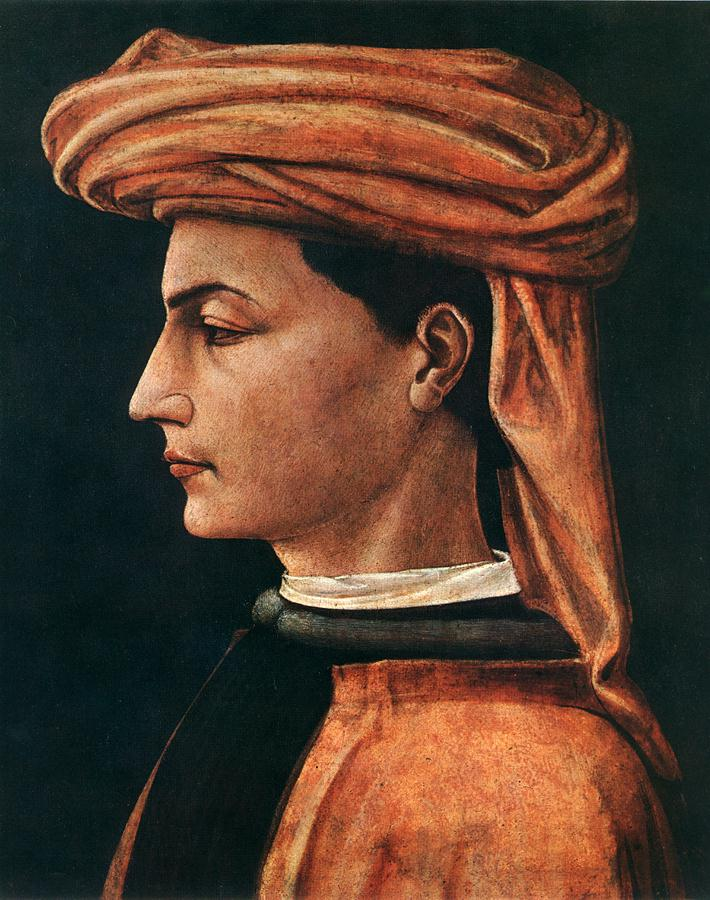
Portrait of a Young Man by Paolo Uccello

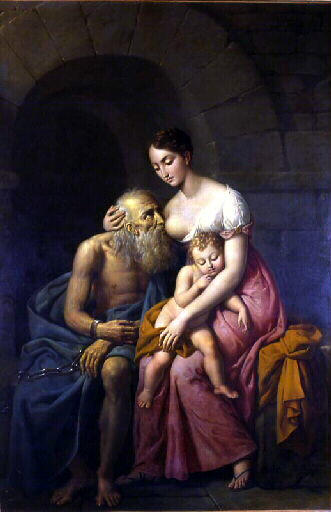
Roman Charity by Gioacchino Giuseppe Serangeli
