= Chambéry =

Prefecture and city in Savoie, France

Chambéry Chambèri (Arpitan)
- Prefecture and commune
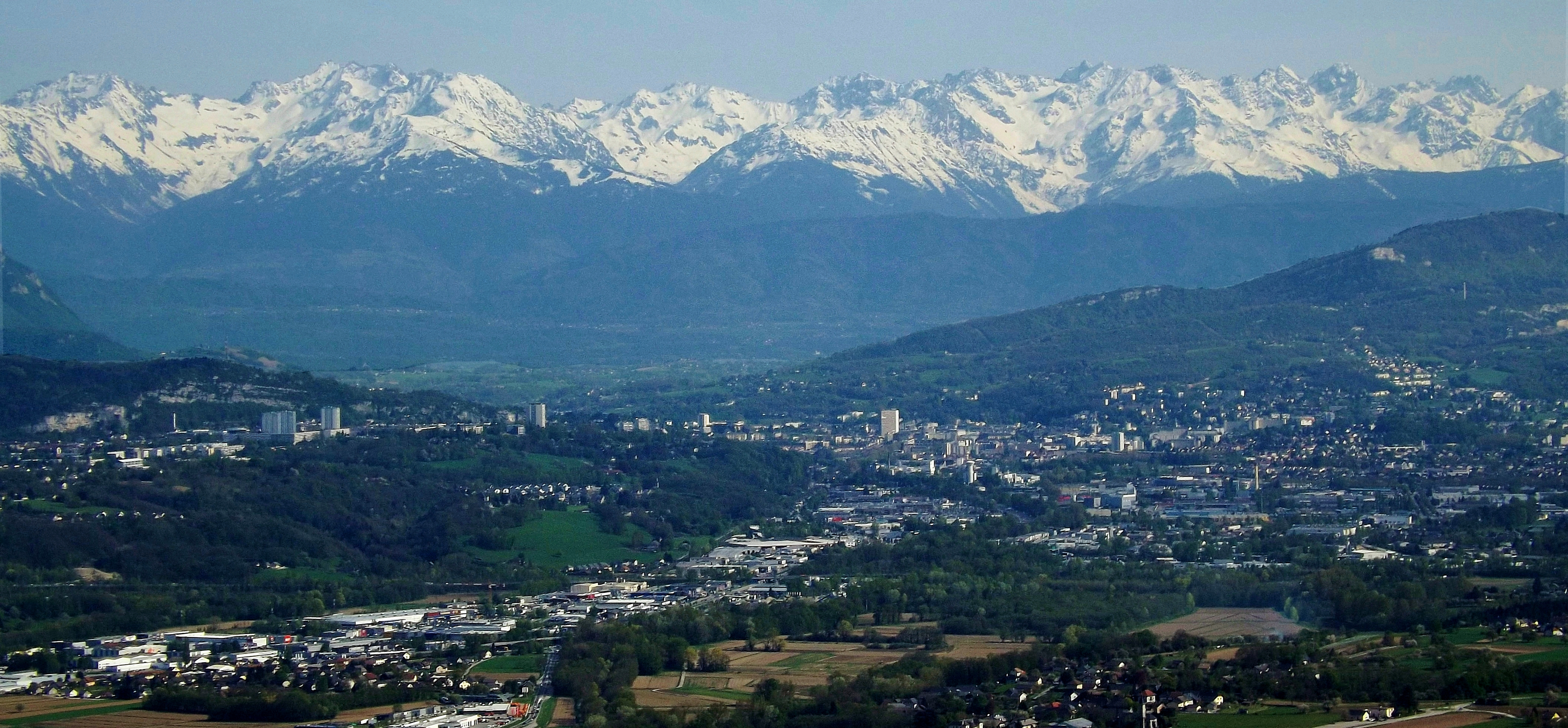
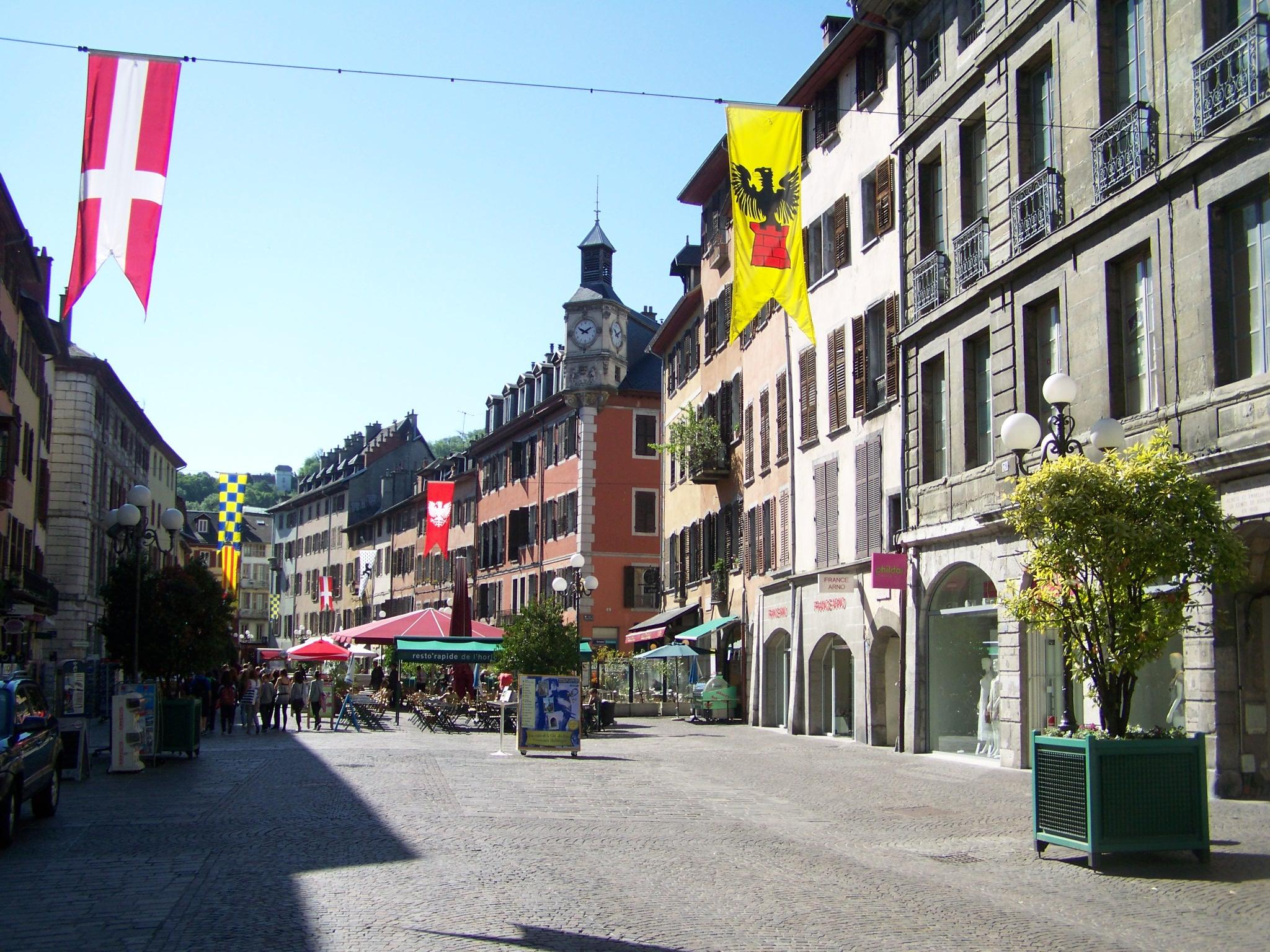
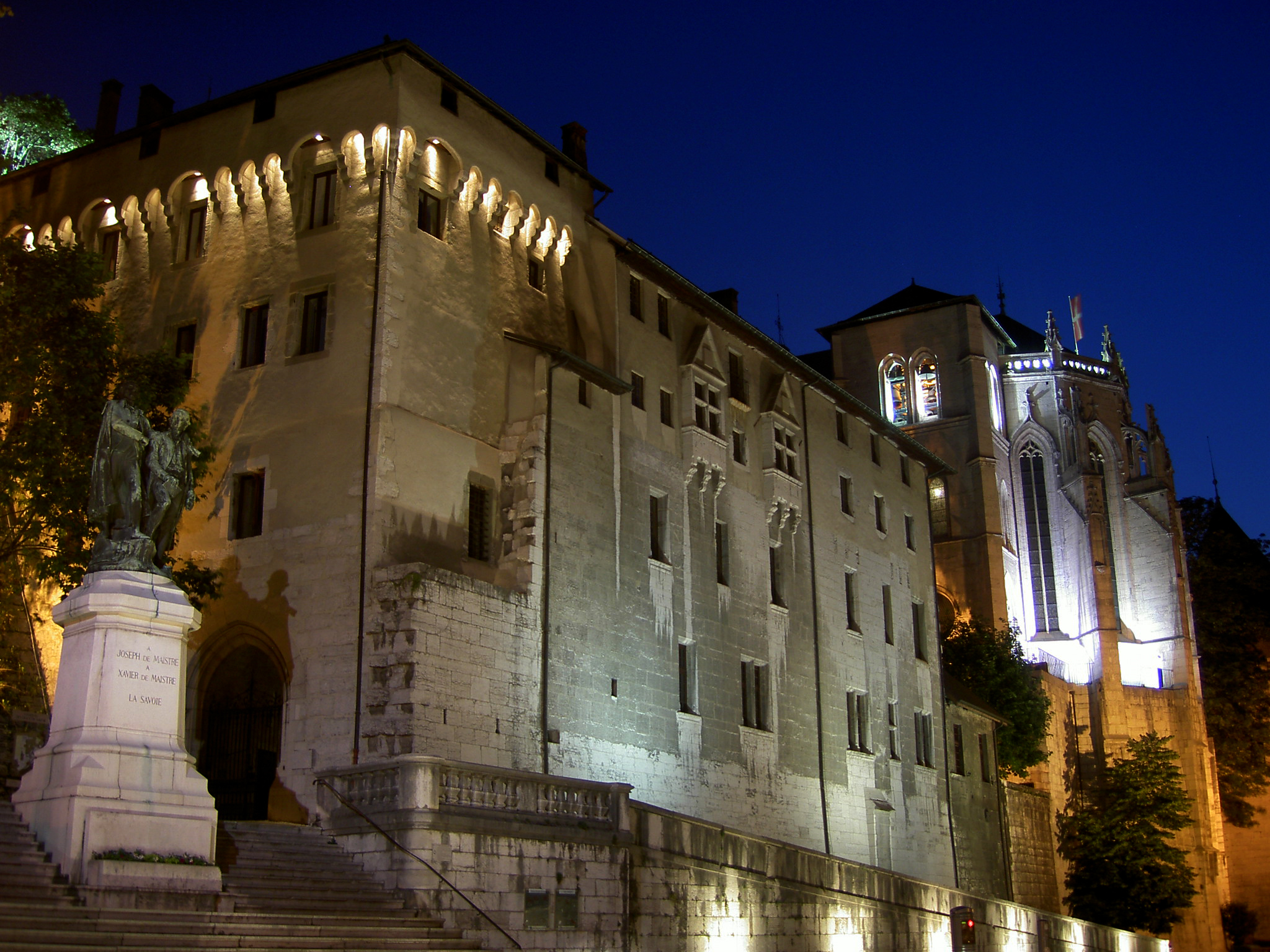
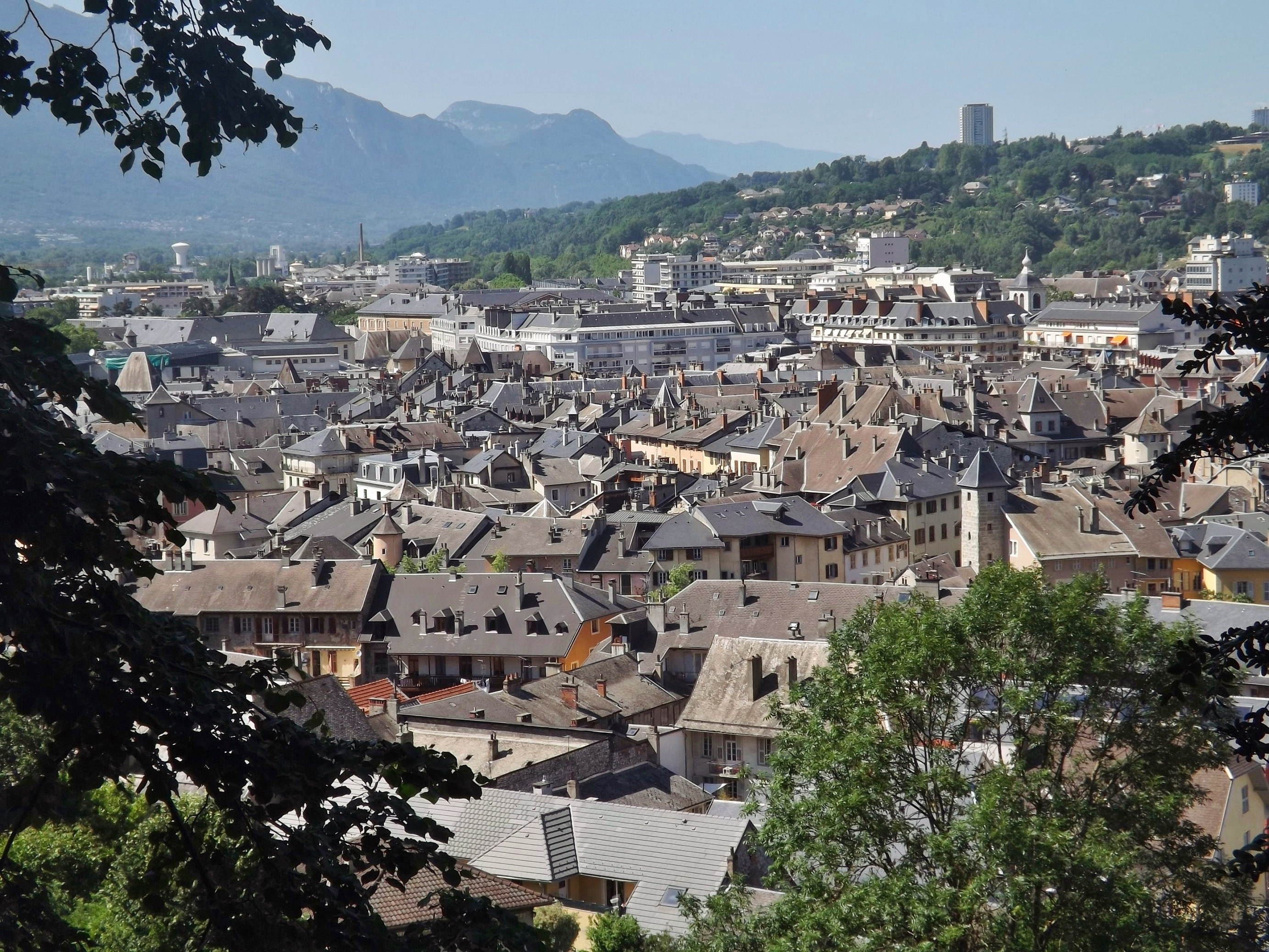
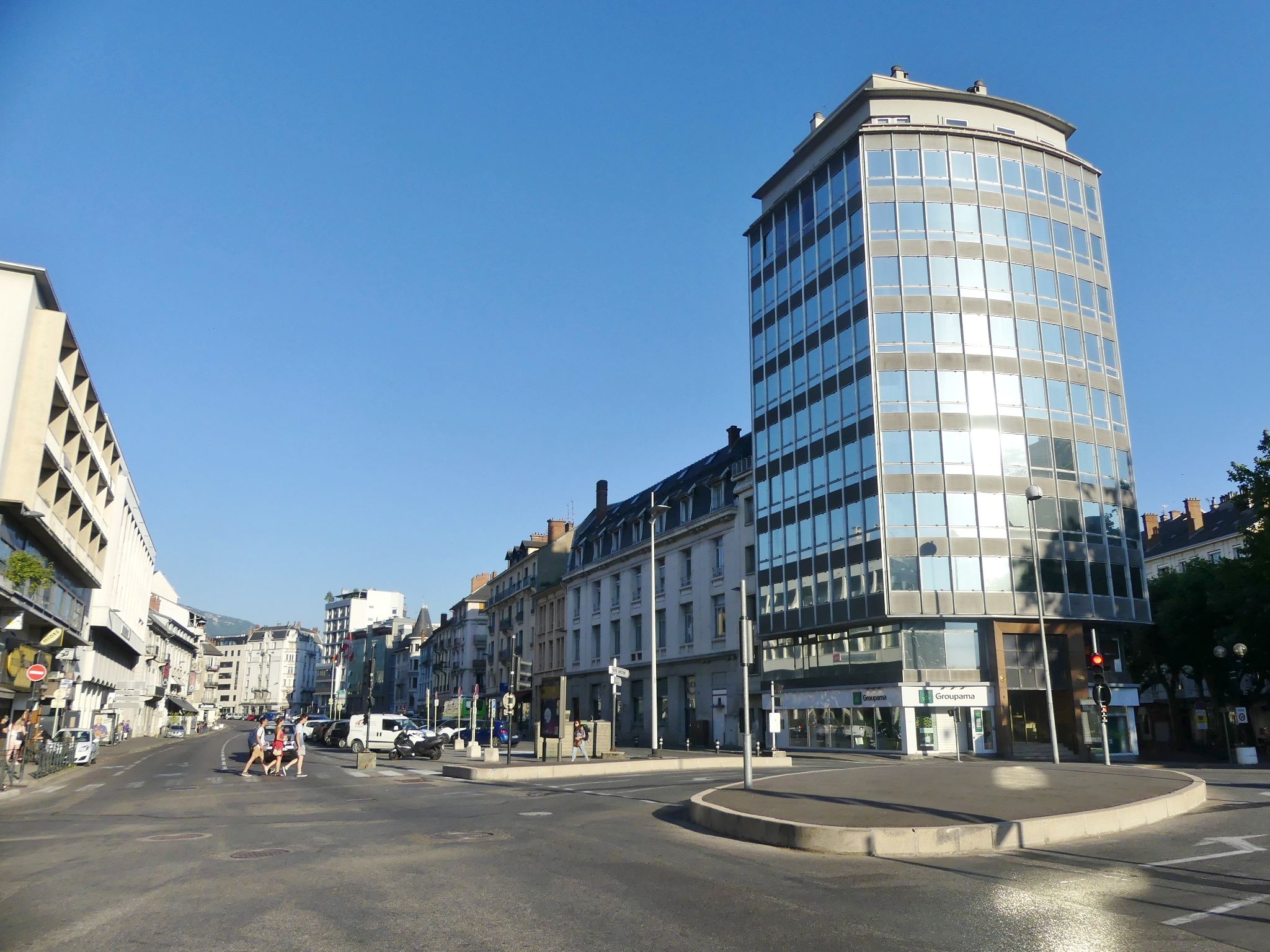
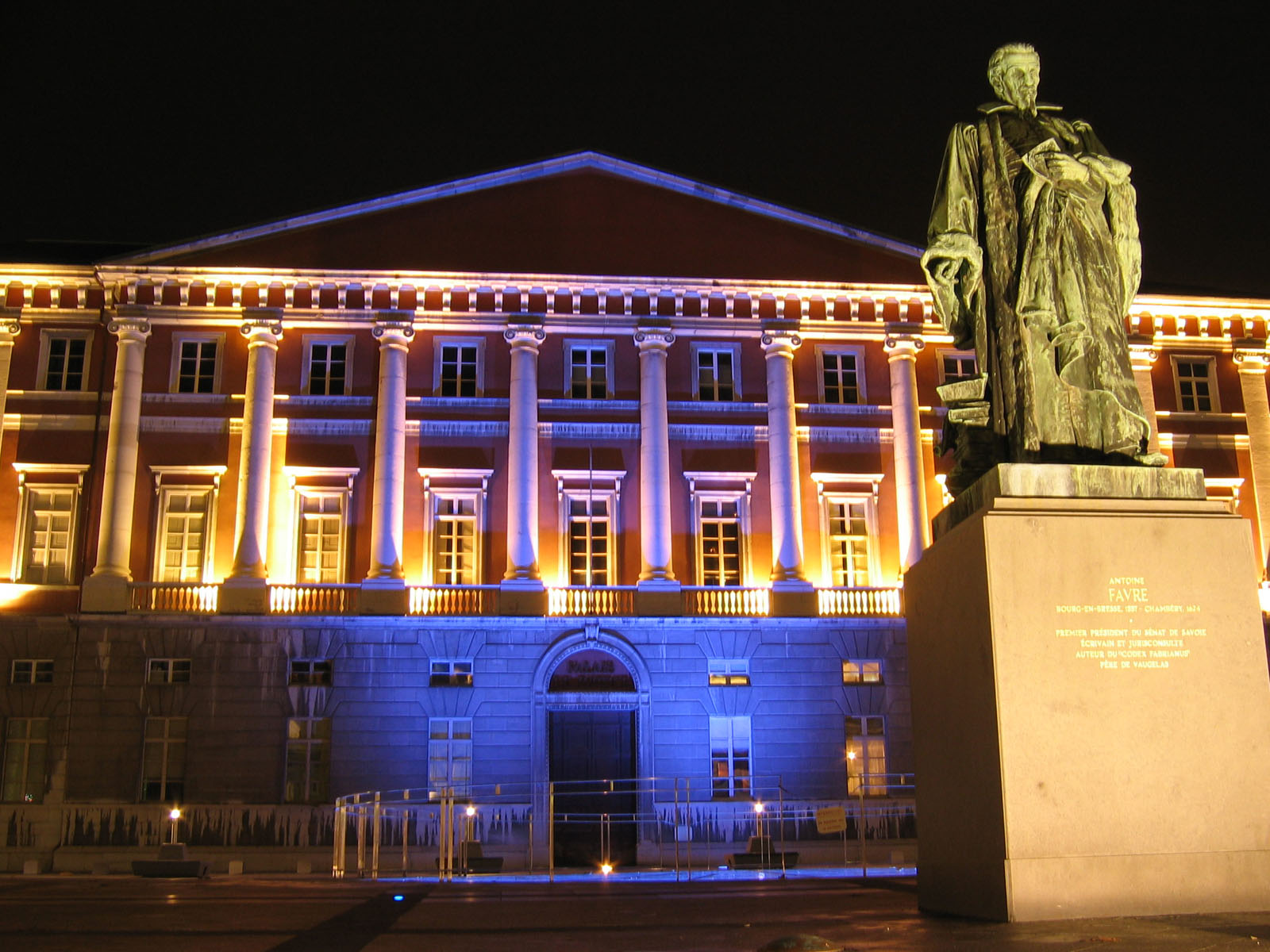
- From top to bottom, left to right: Panorama of Chambéry with Belledonne mountain range at the background, place St-Léger in the old town, the castle of the Dukes of Savoy, panoramic sight on the roofs of the Chambéry historical center, the Place du Centenaire and Chambéry Courthouse.

- Flag Coat of arms
- Location of Chambéry
- Location within France Location within Auvergne-Rhône-Alpes
- Coordinates: 45°34′12″N 5°54′42″E
- Country: France
- Region: Auvergne-Rhône-Alpes
- Department: Savoie
- Arrondissement: Chambéry
- Canton: Chambéry-1, 2 and 3
- Intercommunality: Grand Chambéry

Government
  - Mayor (2020–2026): Thierry Repentin (DVG)
- Area^{1}: 20.99 km^{2} (8.10 sq mi)
  - Urban: 327.5 km^{2} (126.4 sq mi)
  - Metro: 1,147 km^{2} (443 sq mi)
- Elevation: 270 m (890 ft)
- Highest elevation: 560 m (1,840 ft)
- Lowest elevation: 245 m (804 ft)
- Population (2023): 59,964
  - Rank: 94th in France
  - Density: 2,857/km^{2} (7,399/sq mi)
  - Urban (2022): 200,867
  - Urban density: 613.3/km^{2} (1,589/sq mi)
  - Metro (2022): 263,919
  - Metro density: 230.1/km^{2} (595.9/sq mi)
- Time zone: UTC+01:00 (CET)
  - Summer (DST): UTC+02:00 (CEST)
- INSEE/Postal code: 73065 /73000
- Website: www.chambery.fr
- ^{1} French Land Register data, which excludes lakes, ponds, glaciers > 1 km^{2} (0.386 sq mi or 247 acres) and river estuaries.

Chambéry (UK: /ˈʃɒ̃bəri/, US: /ˌʃɒ̃beɪˈriː/, French: [ʃɑ̃beʁi]; Savoyard: Chambèri; outdated Italian: Ciamberì or Sciamberì) is the prefecture and largest city of the Savoie department in the southeastern Auvergne-Rhône-Alpes region of France.

The population of the commune of Chambéry was 60,251 as of 2022, while the population of the Chambéry metropolitan area was 263,919. The city is located at the foot of the French Alps between Bauges and Chartreuse mountains, and is a railway and highway crossroads.

Chambéry was the capital of Savoy from the 13th century, when Amadeus V made the city his seat of power, to the 16th century. The annexation of Savoy merged the city to France in 1860. Together with other alpine towns, Chambéry engages in the Alpine Town of the Year Association for the implementation of the Alpine Convention to achieve sustainable development in the Alpine Arc. It was awarded Alpine Town of the Year 2006.

== Geography ==
Chambéry was founded at a crossroads of ancient routes through the Dauphiné (Dôfenât) region of France, Switzerland, and Italy, in a wide valley between the Bauges and the Chartreuse Mountains on the Leysse River. The metropolitan area has more than 125,000 residents, extending from the vineyard slopes of the Combe de Savoie almost to the shores of the Lac du Bourget, the largest natural lake in France. The city is a major railway hub at the midpoint of the Franco-Italian Turin–Lyon high-speed railway (TGV).

Chambéry is situated in southeast France, 523 kilometres (325 miles) from Paris, 326 kilometres (203 miles) from Marseille, 214 km (133 mi) from Turin, 100 kilometres (62 miles) from Lyon and 85 kilometres (53 miles) from Geneva. It is found in a large valley, surrounded by the Massif des Bauges to the east (dominated by Le Nivolet, upon which La Croix du Nivolet is found), Mont Granier (Chartreuse) and the Chaîne de Belledonne to the south, the Chaîne de l'Épine (the most southern mountain of the Jura) to the west and the Lac du Bourget to the north. If seen as the meeting point of the Jura and the Alps, it is the westernmost point of the Swiss Plateau which lies between them.

The towns surrounding Chambéry are Barberaz, Bassens, Cognin, Jacob-Bellecombette, La Motte-Servolex, La Ravoire, Saint-Alban-Leysse and Sonnaz.

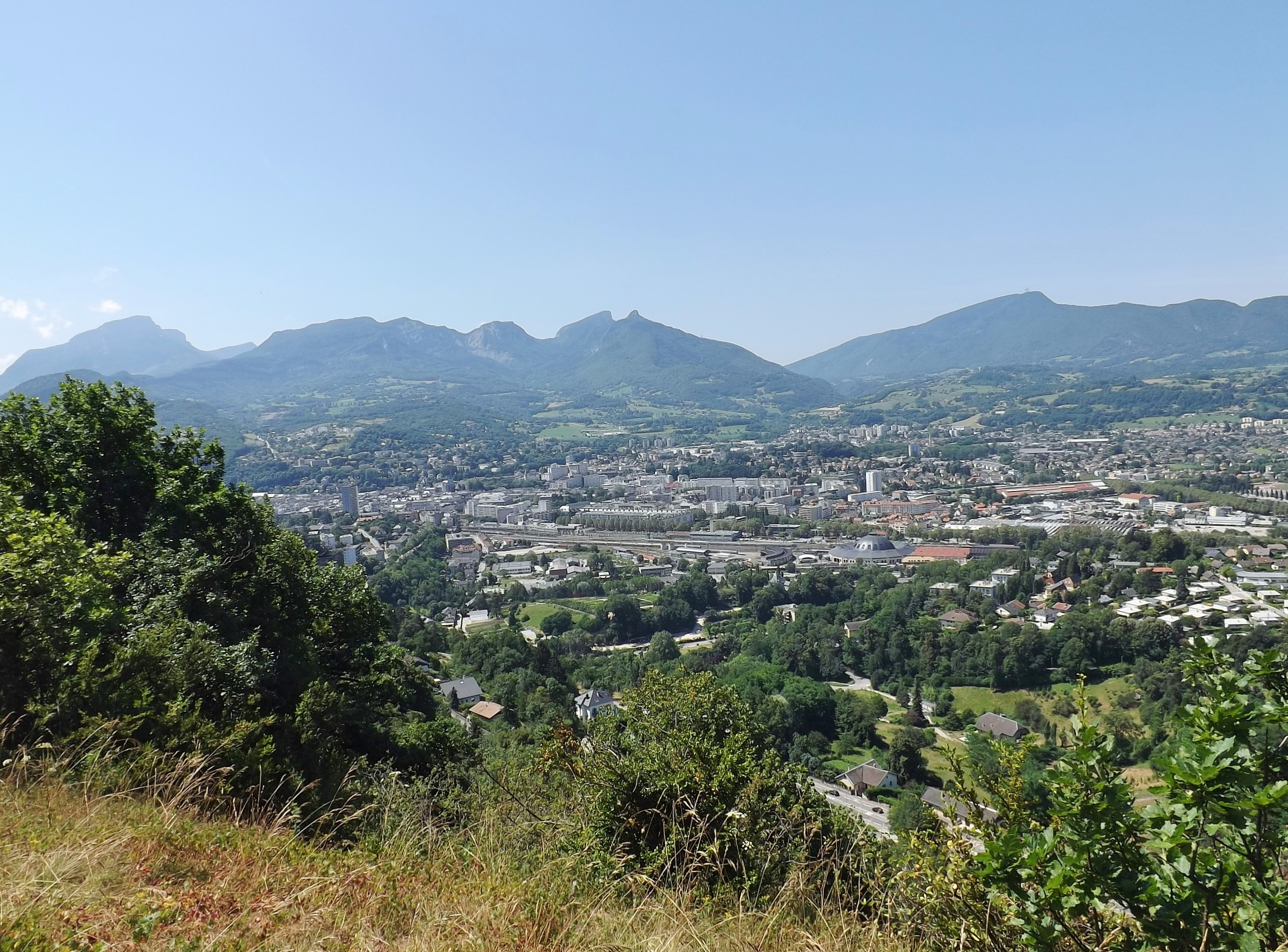
Panorama of Chambéry.

== History ==
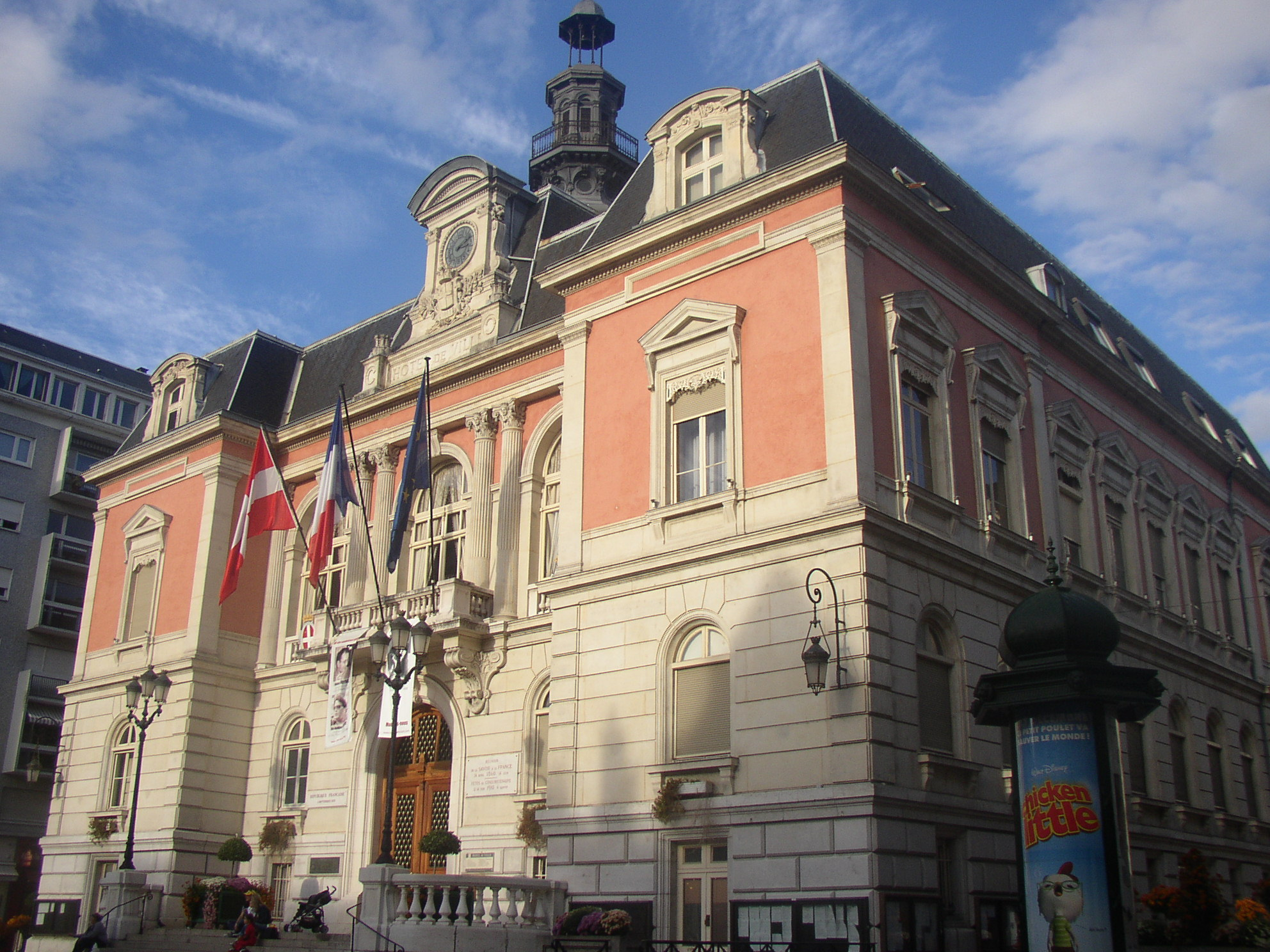
The Hôtel de Ville

The history of Chambéry is closely linked to the House of Savoy and was the Savoyard capital from 1295 to 1563. During this time, Savoy encompassed a region that stretched from Bourg-en-Bresse in the west, across the Alps to Turin, north to Geneva, and south to Nice. Chambéry declined after Emmanuel Philibert, Duke of Savoy moved his capital to Turin in 1563.

France annexed the regions that formerly constituted the Duchy of Savoy west of the Alps in 1792; however, the former duchy and Chambéry were returned to the rulers of the House of Savoy in Turin in 1815 following the defeat of Napoleon Bonaparte. The need for urban revitalization was met by the establishment of the Société Académique de Savoie in 1820, which was devoted to material and ethical progress, now housed in an apartment of the ducal château. Chambéry and lands of the former duchy, as well as the County of Nice, were ceded to France by Piedmont in 1860, under the reign of Napoleon III. The Hôtel de Ville was officially opened in 1867.

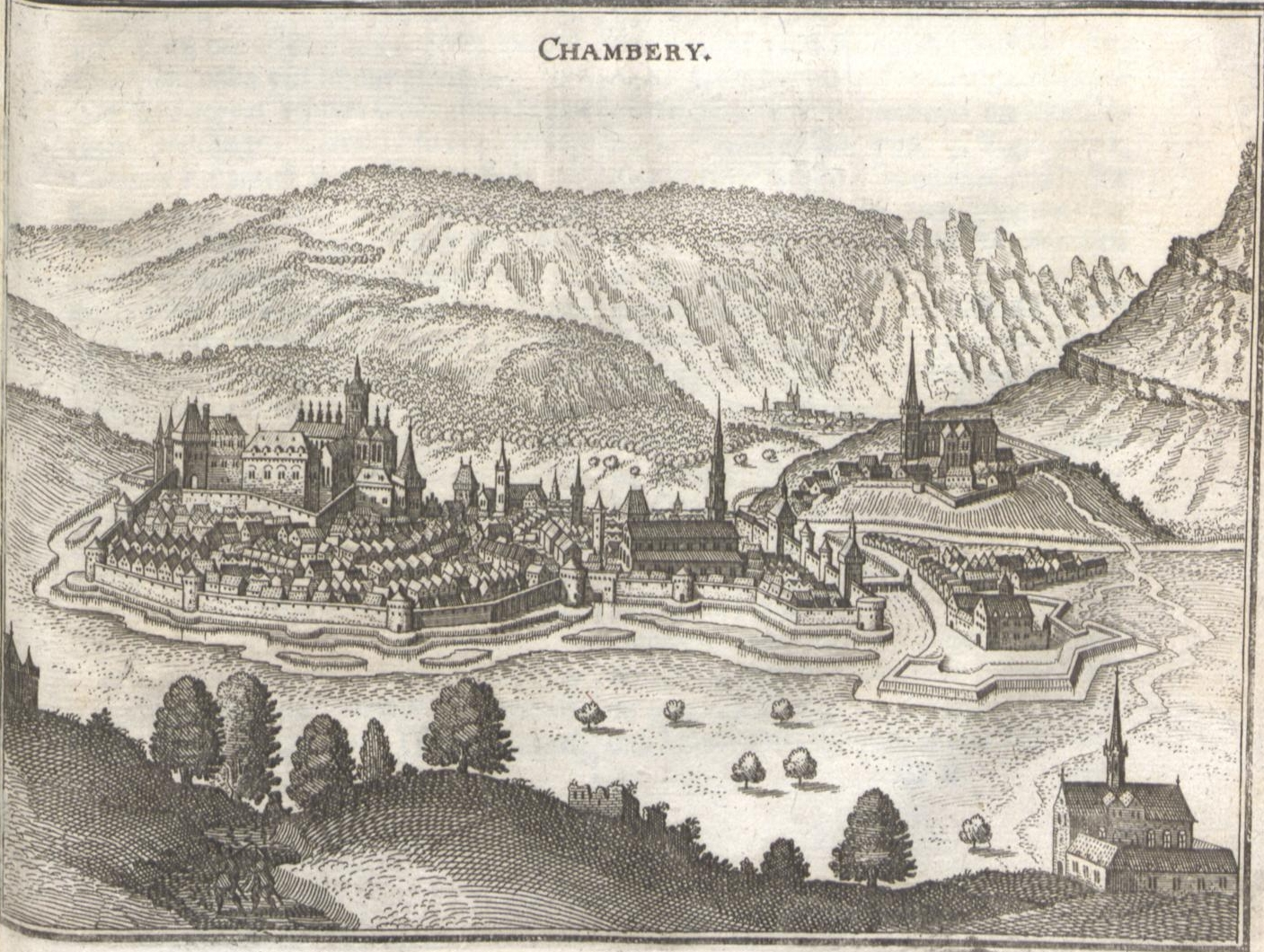
Chambéry in 1645.

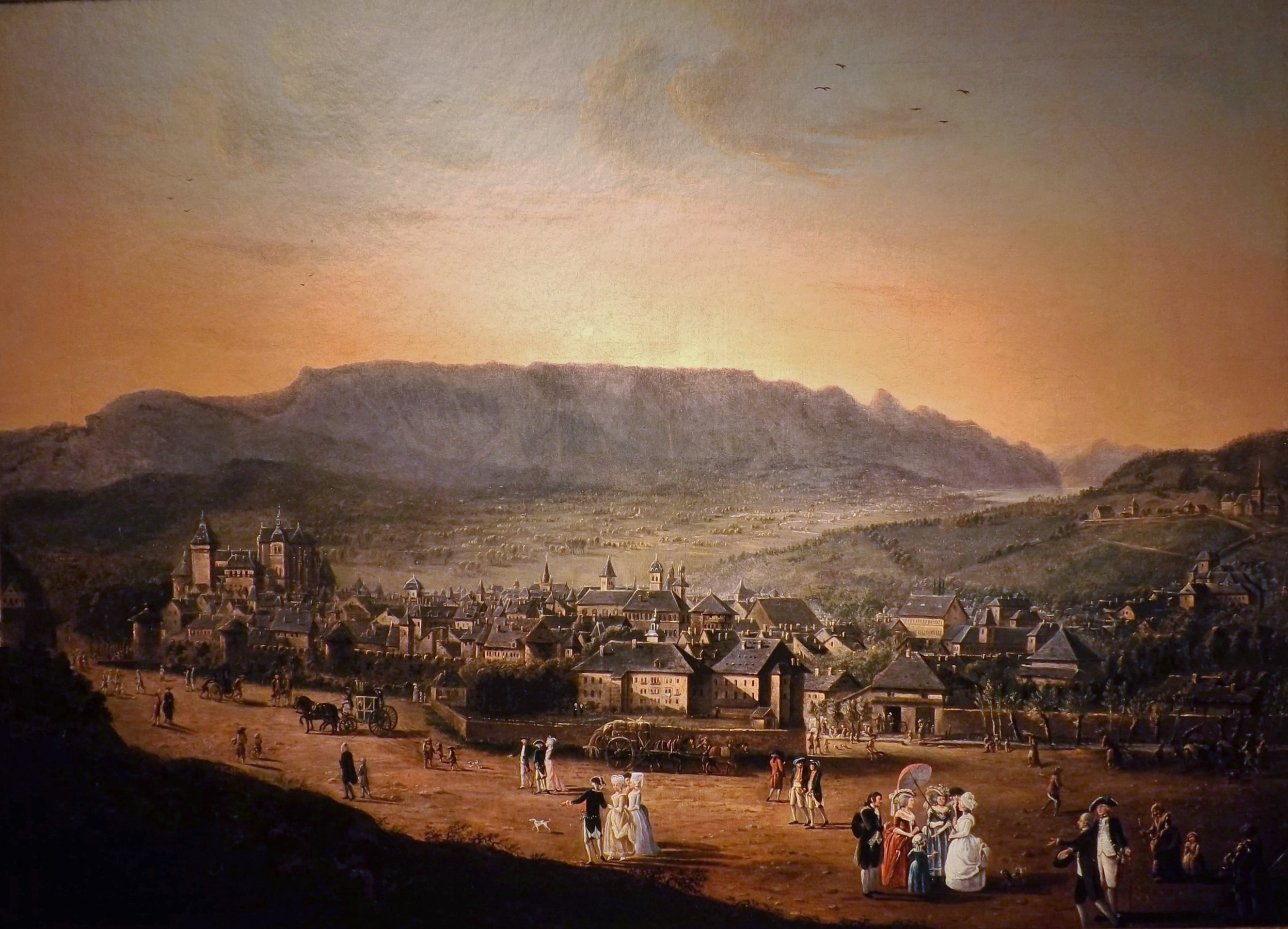
Around 1780.

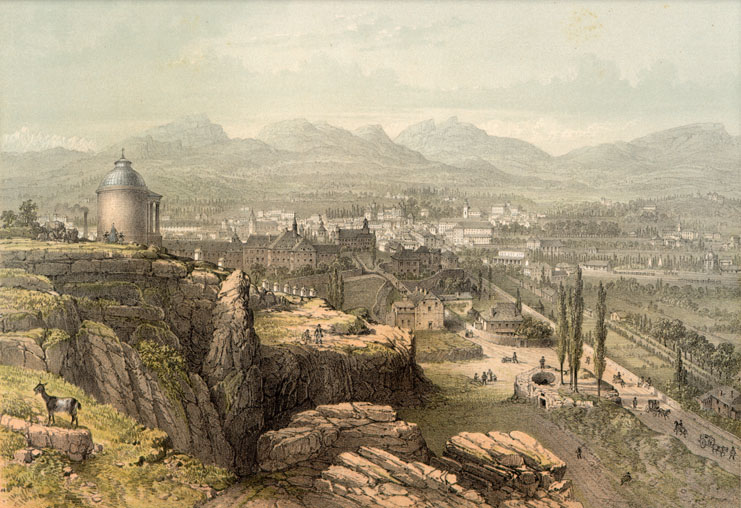
In 1864.

== Climate ==
Chambéry is right on the boundary between the humid subtropical (Cfa) and oceanic climates (Cfb) under the Köppen system. In spite of this it is highly influenced by its interior position within France, resulting in quite hot summers and winters with frequent temperatures below freezing, especially at night. Convective rainfall is frequent for much of the year, rendering high precipitation/day quotas.

Climate data for Chambéry Airport (1991–2020 averages)
Month	Jan	Feb	Mar	Apr	May	Jun	Jul	Aug	Sep	Oct	Nov	Dec	Year
Record high °C (°F)	20.3 (68.5)	20.7 (69.3)	25.1 (77.2)	29.5 (85.1)	32.7 (90.9)	36.7 (98.1)	38.8 (101.8)	38.8 (101.8)	32.3 (90.1)	29.0 (84.2)	23.3 (73.9)	22.7 (72.9)	38.8 (101.8)
Mean daily maximum °C (°F)	6.4 (43.5)	8.5 (47.3)	13.4 (56.1)	17.3 (63.1)	21.3 (70.3)	25.3 (77.5)	27.8 (82.0)	27.1 (80.8)	22.3 (72.1)	17.0 (62.6)	10.6 (51.1)	6.9 (44.4)	17.0 (62.6)
Daily mean °C (°F)	2.9 (37.2)	4.1 (39.4)	8.0 (46.4)	11.4 (52.5)	15.6 (60.1)	19.4 (66.9)	21.4 (70.5)	20.9 (69.6)	16.8 (62.2)	12.3 (54.1)	6.9 (44.4)	3.4 (38.1)	11.9 (53.4)
Mean daily minimum °C (°F)	−0.7 (30.7)	−0.4 (31.3)	2.5 (36.5)	5.6 (42.1)	10.0 (50.0)	13.5 (56.3)	15.0 (59.0)	14.6 (58.3)	11.3 (52.3)	7.7 (45.9)	3.1 (37.6)	0.0 (32.0)	6.8 (44.2)
Record low °C (°F)	−19.0 (−2.2)	−14.4 (6.1)	−10.3 (13.5)	−4.6 (23.7)	−1.4 (29.5)	2.8 (37.0)	5.4 (41.7)	5.0 (41.0)	1.0 (33.8)	−4.3 (24.3)	−10.8 (12.6)	−13.5 (7.7)	−19.0 (−2.2)
Average precipitation mm (inches)	102.6 (4.04)	79.1 (3.11)	93.1 (3.67)	87.9 (3.46)	101.0 (3.98)	94.5 (3.72)	91.7 (3.61)	97.6 (3.84)	104.3 (4.11)	113.3 (4.46)	114.6 (4.51)	124.2 (4.89)	1,203.9 (47.40)
Average precipitation days	9.7	8.1	9.7	9.6	11.1	9.9	8.2	8.5	8.8	10.3	10.1	10.6	114.6
Average snowy days	5.4	4.6	2.2	1.2	0.0	0.0	0.0	0.0	0.0	0.0	1.7	3.2	18.3
Mean monthly sunshine hours	76.6	101.8	157.8	176.2	202.3	236.3	261.6	237.1	180.7	123.8	74.5	66.3	1,894.9
Source: Météo France

== Main sights ==
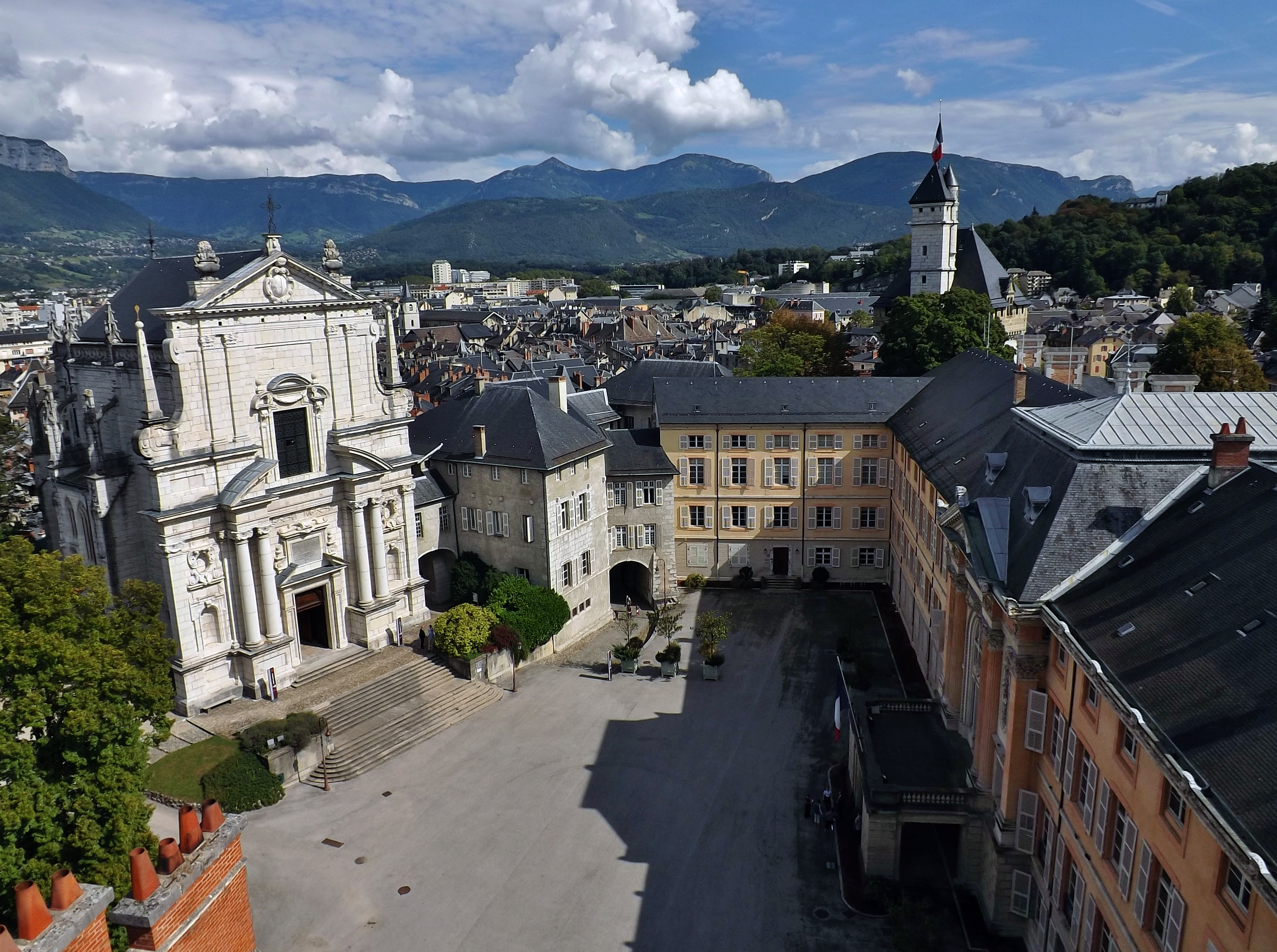
Cour du Château in central Chambéry : Sainte-Chapelle (left) and Aile du Midi (right).

=== Château des ducs de Savoie ===
The Château des ducs de Savoie, also known as Château de Chambéry, is a fortified castle dating from the 11th century. The first counts of Savoy settled into an existing fortress in 1285 and expanded it in the early-14th century to serve as a residence, seat of power and administration, and as stronghold for the House of Savoy. However, it quickly became obsolete as a serious fortification genuinely capable of resisting a siege. Due to constant French hostilities, Duke Emmanuel Philibert decided to move his capital to Turin.

The château remained purely an administrative centre until Christine Marie of France, Duchess of Savoy, returned to hold court in 1640. It was the site of the 1684 marriage between Victor Amadeus II and Anne Marie d'Orléans, niece of Louis XIV. Victor Amadeus II, having abdicated, lived here with his second wife Anna Canalis di Cumiana before they were imprisoned at the Castle of Rivoli for trying to reclaim the throne.

In 1786, Victor Amadeus III enlarged it, adding a Royal Wing.

Under Napoleon Bonaparte, the Aile du Midi ("South Wing") was rebuilt and redecorated to house the imperial prefecture of the department of Mont-Blanc. Elaborate modification to the structure were made again after Savoy was annexed by France in 1860.

Today, the political administration of the department of Savoie is located in the castle, and it is open for tours and concerts.

The most famous landmark in Chambéry: the Elephants Fountain.

=== Fontaine des Éléphants ===
The Fontaine des Éléphants ("Elephants Fountain") is the most famous landmark in Chambéry. It was built in 1838 to honour Benoît de Boigne's feats when he was in India. The monumental fountain has realistic sculptures of the head and forelimbs of four lifesize elephants truncated into the base of a tall column in the shape of the savoyan (savoyarde) cross, topped by a statue of de Boigne. At first, the landmark was mocked by the local residents who were annoyed by it, but it now is accepted as one of the city's symbols.

Since the early controversy, the statue kept its nickname of les quatre sans culs, ("the four without arses", which sounds in French similar to the title of the best-known movie by nouvelle vague director François Truffaut: Les quatre cents coups, "The 400 Blows"). A total restoration was done between December 2014 and July 2015.

=== Others ===
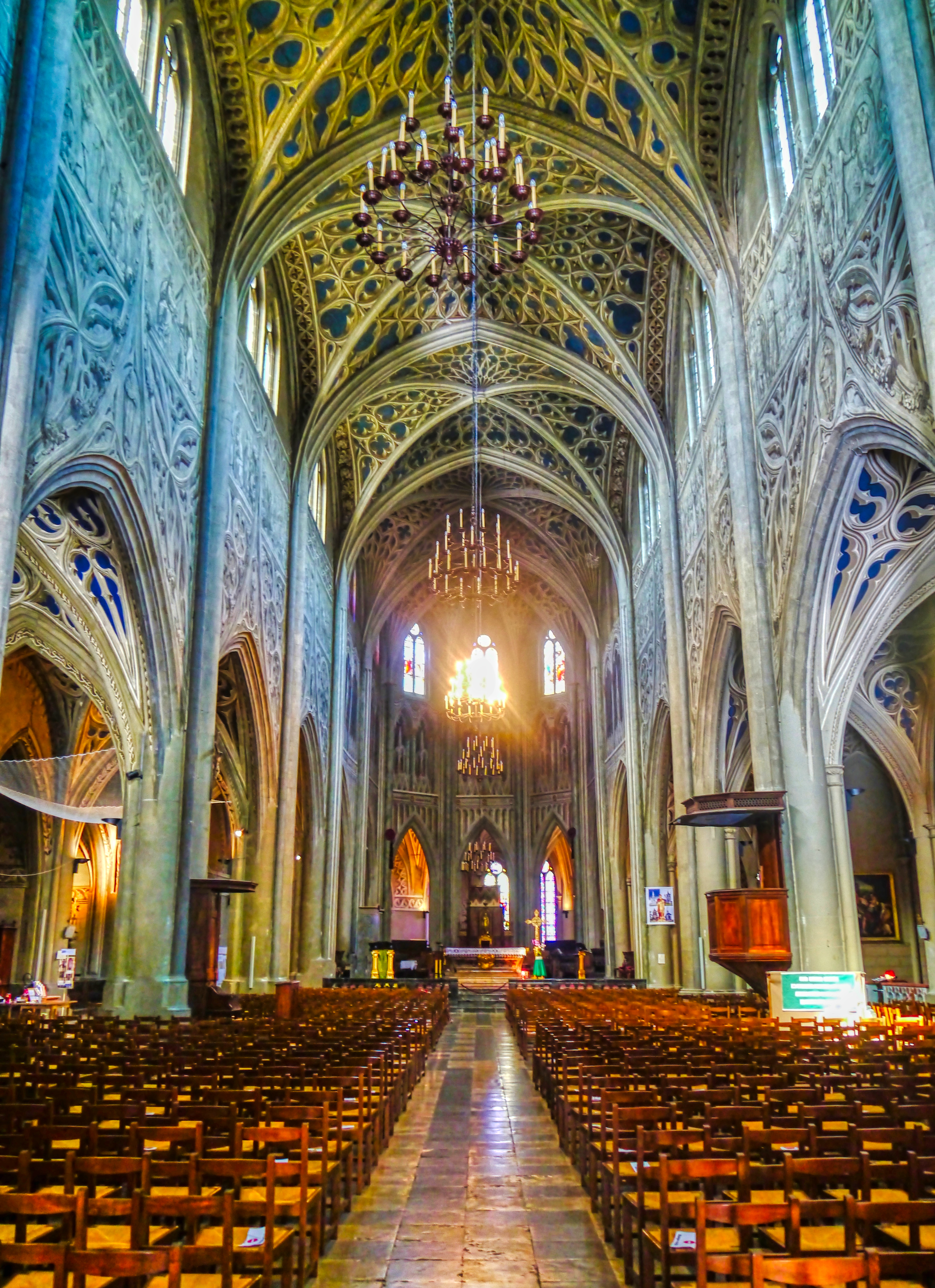
Chambéry Cathedral

The Cistercian Abbey of Hautecombe, founded in 1135, is one of the burial places of the rulers of the House of Savoy. Saint Francis de Sales officiated at Notre-Dame de Myans (established before the 12th century). Francis I of France went to Notre-Dame de l'Aumône at Rumilly in the 13th century as a pilgrim. The Sisters of St Joseph, an order founded at Chambéry in 1812, devotes itself to teaching and charitable work, and today, its members are now spread worldwide.

The cathedral of Saint Francis of Sales in Chambéry presents one of the best examples of Savoyard trompe-l’oeil paintings and the largest in Europe. It also houses an organ listed as a historic monument, as well as an identical replica of the Holy Shroud gifted by the Archbishop of Turin. The original had resided in the ducal chapel in Chambéry between 1466 and 1578.

Chambéry is also the administrative headquarters of the Orchestre des Pays de Savoie.

== Education ==
The Savoy Mont Blanc University (a.k.a. Chambéry University) is a university founded in 1979 with one campus in Annecy and two around Chambéry. It has about 15,000 students.

Chambéry has a campus of the Arts et Métiers ParisTech (ENSAM) engineering graduate school, which created a research institute in 1994 there. It offers doctoral and master programs in the field of mechanical and industrial engineering.

Chambéry is also home to the INSEEC Business School, a French business school which offers Master in Management – Grande école program educational system.

== Transport ==
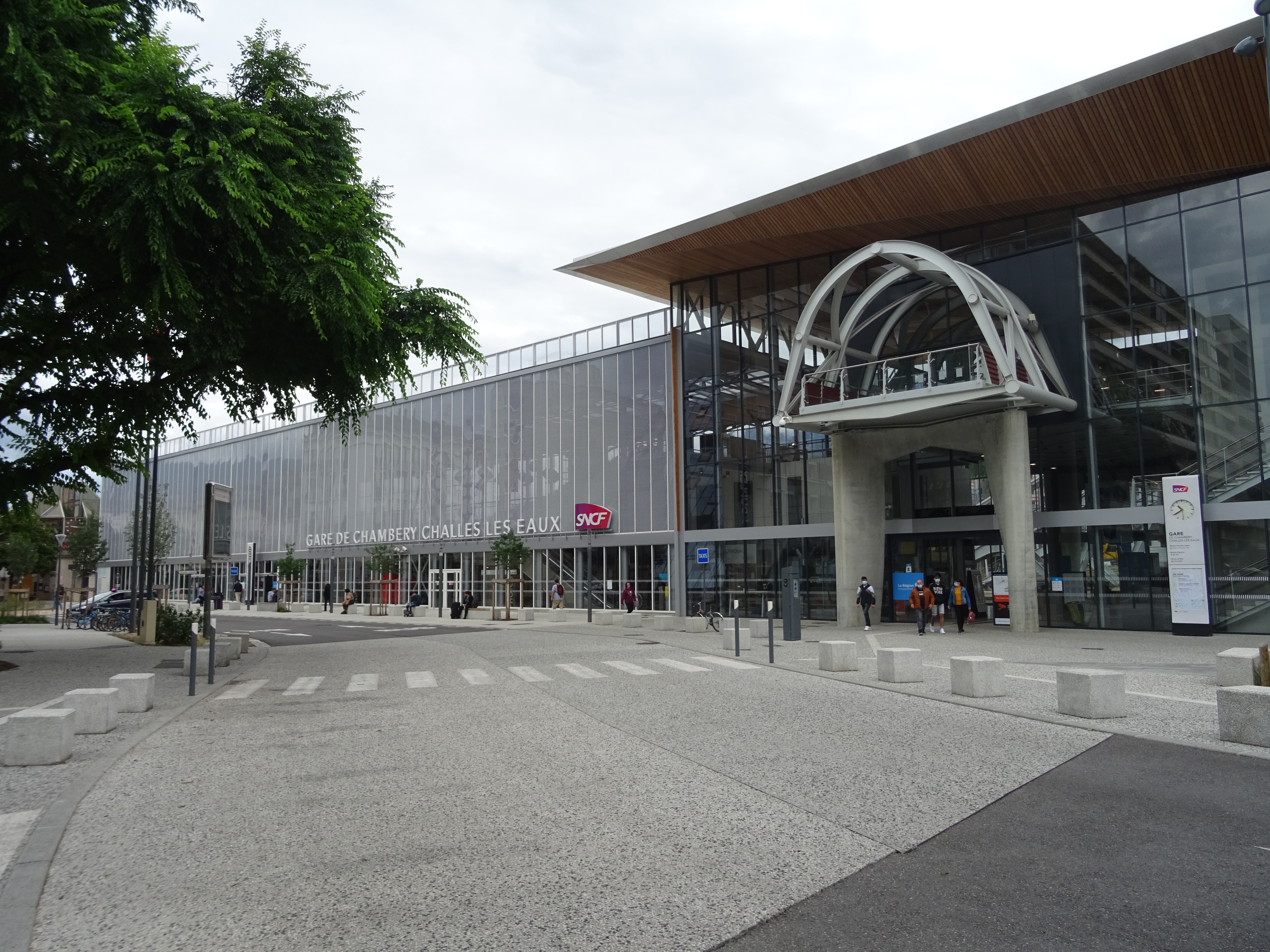
Chambéry-Challes-les-Eaux station

The city is served by Chambéry Airport, located 10 km (6 mi) north of the city centre. The airport only provides direct routes to the United Kingdom. Other nearby airports are Lyon-Saint Exupéry Airport, located 87 km (54 mi) south east and Geneva Airport, located 88 km (55 mi) north of Chambéry.

The Chambéry-Challes-les-Eaux station provides rail connections.

From 1892 to 1932, the Chambéry tramway, a narrow-gauge steam tram network, connected the town with its surroundings.

== Military ==
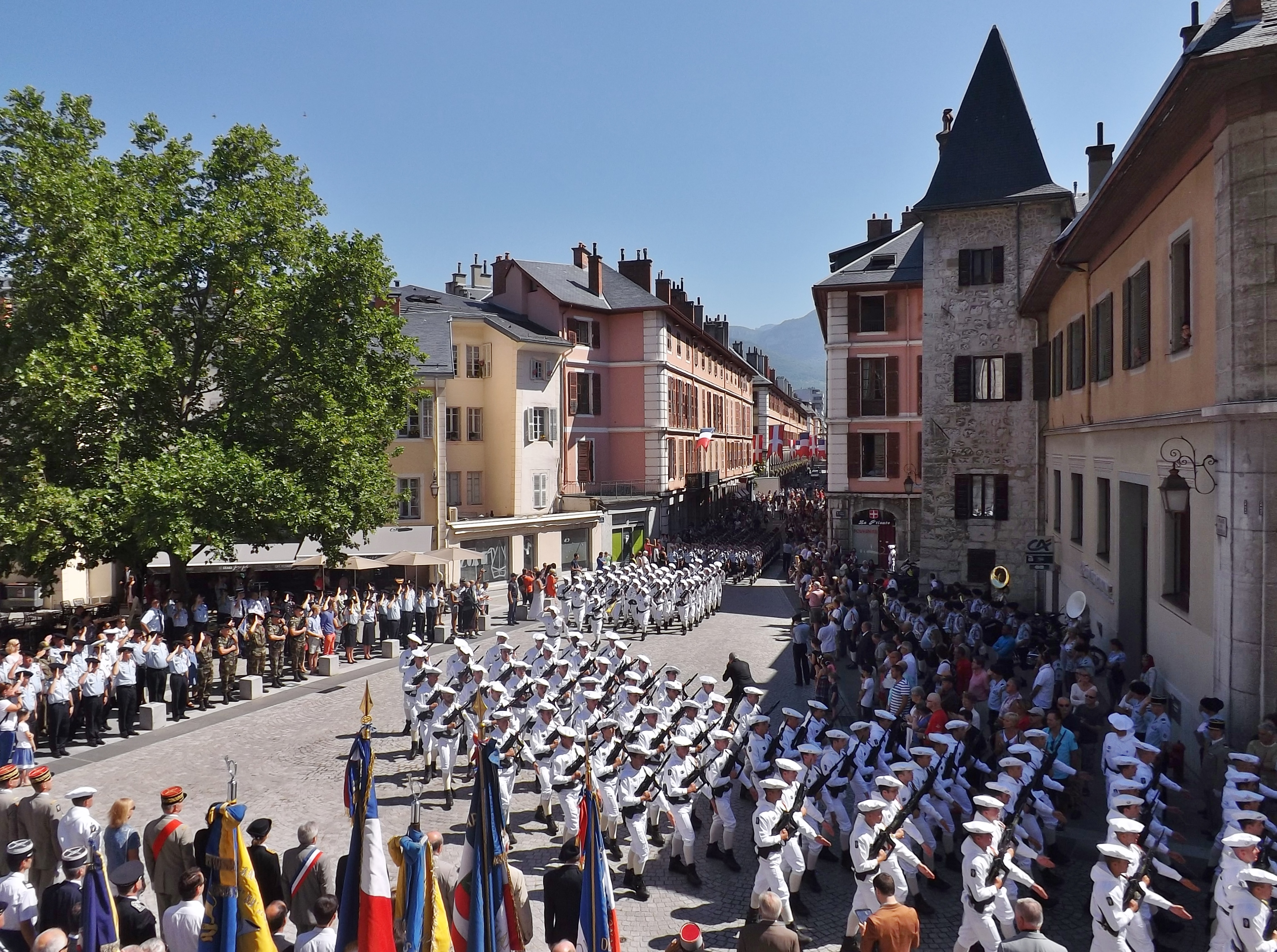
13th Battalion of Chasseurs Alpins on parade in downtown Chambéry.

Chambéry is home to the 13th Battalion of the Chasseurs Alpins.

== Demographics ==
In 2022, 60,251 people lived in the city, while its metropolitan area had a population of 263,919.

Historical population

Year	Pop.	±% p.a.
1793	11,425	—
1800	10,800	−0.80%
1806	11,991	+1.76%
1822	11,236	−0.41%
1838	15,916	+2.20%
1858	19,035	+0.90%
1861	19,953	+1.58%
1866	18,835	−1.15%
1872	19,144	+0.27%
1876	18,545	−0.79%
1881	19,622	+1.14%
1886	20,916	+1.29%
1891	20,922	+0.01%
1896	21,762	+0.79%
1901	22,108	+0.32%
1906	23,027	+0.82%
1911	22,958	−0.06%

Year	Pop.	±% p.a.
1921	20,617	−1.07%
1926	23,400	+2.56%
1931	25,407	+1.66%
1936	28,073	+2.02%
1946	29,975	+0.66%
1954	32,139	+0.88%
1962	44,246	+4.08%
1968	51,056	+2.41%
1975	54,415	+0.91%
1982	53,427	−0.26%
1990	54,120	+0.16%
1999	55,786	+0.34%
2007	57,420	+0.36%
2012	58,039	+0.21%
2017	58,919	+0.30%
2023	59,964	+0.29%

Source: EHESS and INSEE

== Vermouth ==
Chambéry is an AOC region for Chambéry vermouth, where the Dolin and Routin brands are made.

== Sports ==
- Chambéry Savoie Mont-Blanc Handball
- Chambéry SF
- Stade Olympique Chambérien Rugby.

== Notable people ==
Chambéry was the birthplace of (chronological order):

- Thomas, Count of Savoy (1178–1233), who buys the city, with the exception of the castle, to Viscount Berlion de Chambéry, 15 March 1230
- Amadeus V, Count of Savoy (ca.1252 - 1323), who buys in 1295 the castle of Chambéry, which will become the main county residence of the House of Savoy
- François de Candie (ca.1314–1360), 1st Viscount of Geneva, nobleman and military commander of the Royal Guard of Savoy, Lord of the Chateau of Rumilly, and Salagine
- Amadeus VIII, Duke of Savoy (1383–1451), Pope Felix V from 1439 to 1449
- Joseph Colon Trabotto (c. 1420–1480), Jewish scholar, talmudist, and rabbi
- César Vichard de Saint-Réal (1639–1692), novelist
- Amédée-François Frézier (1682–1773), engineer, mathematician, spy, and explorer
- Benoît de Boigne (1751–1830), military adventurer in India
- Joseph de Maistre (1753–1821), conservative political philosopher and critic of the French Revolution
- Xavier de Maistre (1763–1852), soldier and author
- Luigi Federico, conte Menabrea (1809–1896), Italian prime minister and general
- Simone Antonio Saint-Bon (1828–1892), admiral of the Italian Regia Marina (Royal Navy)
- Pierre Lanfrey (1828–1877), historian and politician
- Pierre Pendaries (1893–??), World War I flying ace
- Michel de Certeau (1925–1986), Jesuit and scholar
- Louis Besson (1937-2026), mayor of Chambéry and French minister for housing
- Jean-Michel Roddaz (born 1948), historian
- brothers Renaud Capuçon (born 1976) and Gautier Capuçon (born 1981); violinist & cellist
- Grégory Lemarchal (1983–2007), French singer and winner from the reality TV programme Star Academy in 2004
- Olivier Giroud (born 1986), French international footballer and striker for Ligue 1 club Lille
- Michaël Rossi (born 1988), racing driver
- Marion Allemoz (born 1989), captain of the France women's national ice hockey team and first French player to play professional women's hockey in North America
- Romain Favre (born 2005), racing driver

== Twin cities ==
Chambéry is twinned with:

- Albstadt, Germany
- Blainville, Canada
- Ouahigouya, Burkina Faso
- Shawinigan, Canada
- Turin, Italy
- Zhangjiakou, China

== See also ==
- Duchy of Savoy
- Archdiocese of Chambéry
- Roman Catholic Archdiocese of Chambéry–Saint-Jean-de-Maurienne–Tarentaise
- Kingdom of Sardinia
- Arpitan language
- Communes of the Savoie department
- Listing of the works of Alexandre Falguière
