= Sonnaz =

Sonnaz Sonâ (Savoyard)
- Commune
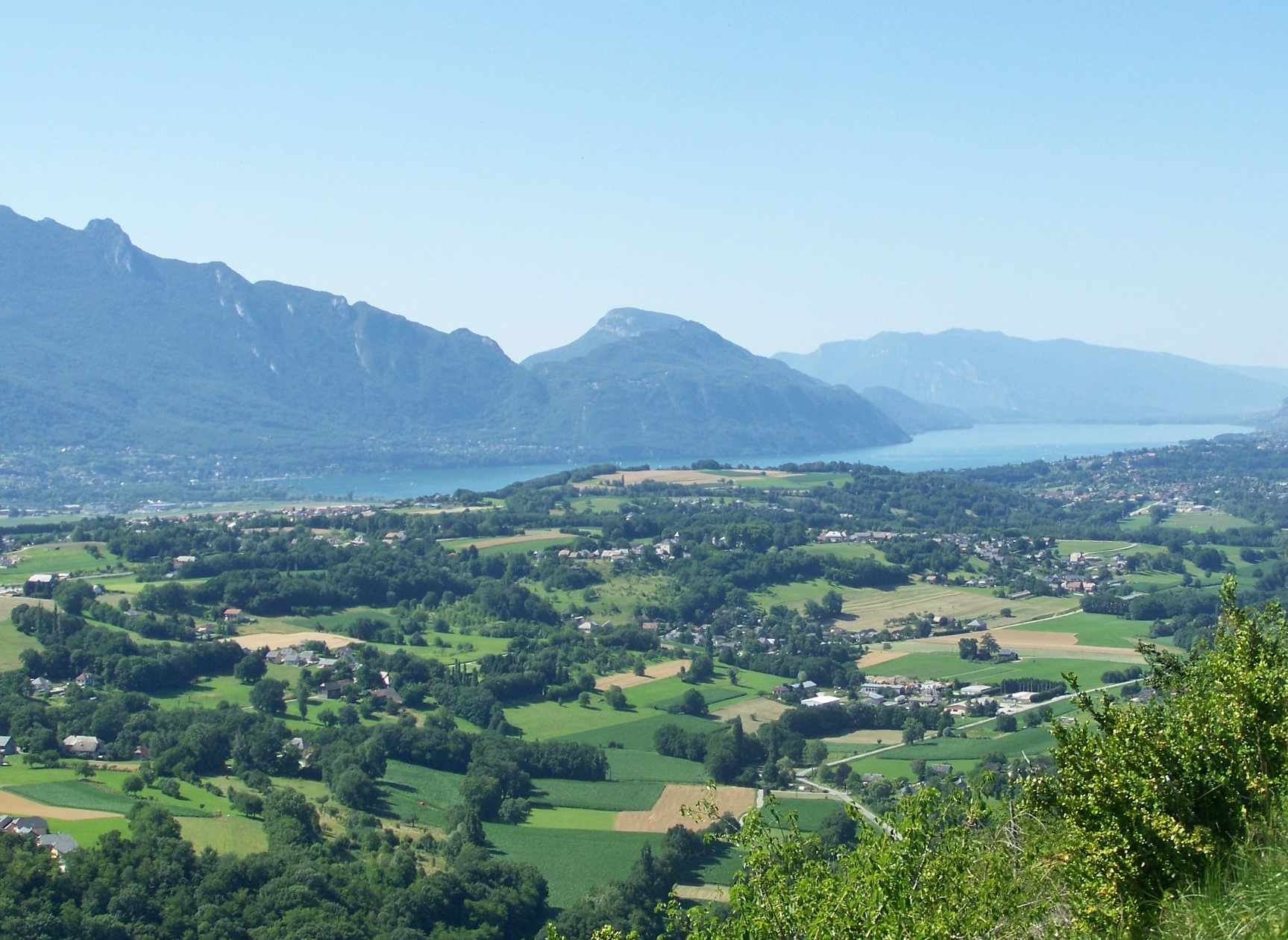
- A general view of Sonnaz

- Coat of arms
- Location of Sonnaz
- Location within France Location within Auvergne-Rhône-Alpes
- Coordinates: 45°36′56″N 5°55′22″E
- Country: France
- Region: Auvergne-Rhône-Alpes
- Department: Savoie
- Arrondissement: Chambéry
- Canton: Chambéry-1
- Intercommunality: Grand Chambéry

Government
  - Mayor (2020–2026): Daniel Rochaix
- Area^{1}: 6.79 km^{2} (2.62 sq mi)
- Highest elevation: 680 m (2,230 ft)
- Lowest elevation: 271 m (889 ft)
- Population (2023): 2,130
  - Density: 314/km^{2} (812/sq mi)
- Time zone: UTC+01:00 (CET)
  - Summer (DST): UTC+02:00 (CEST)
- INSEE/Postal code: 73288 /73000
- Website: www.sonnaz.fr
- ^{1} French Land Register data, which excludes lakes, ponds, glaciers > 1 km^{2} (0.386 sq mi or 247 acres) and river estuaries.

Sonnaz (French pronunciation: [sɔna]; Savoyard: Sonâ) is a commune in the Savoie department in the Auvergne-Rhône-Alpes region in south-eastern France. It is part of the urban area of Chambéry.

== Population ==
Historical population
Year	Pop.	±% p.a.
1968	459	—
1975	667	+5.48%
1982	849	+3.51%
1990	977	+1.77%
1999	1,222	+2.52%
2007	1,271	+0.49%
2012	1,677	+5.70%
2017	1,857	+2.06%
2023	2,130	+2.31%
Source: INSEE

== See also ==
- Communes of the Savoie department
