= Chambéry tramway =

Rail line in Savoie, France

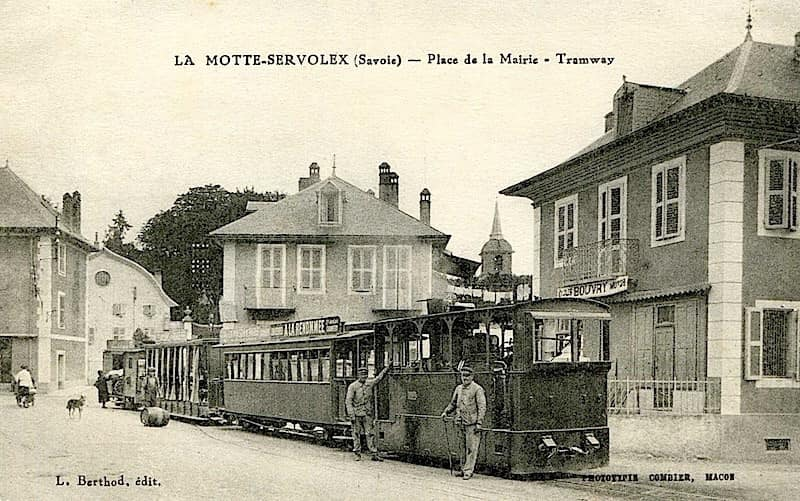
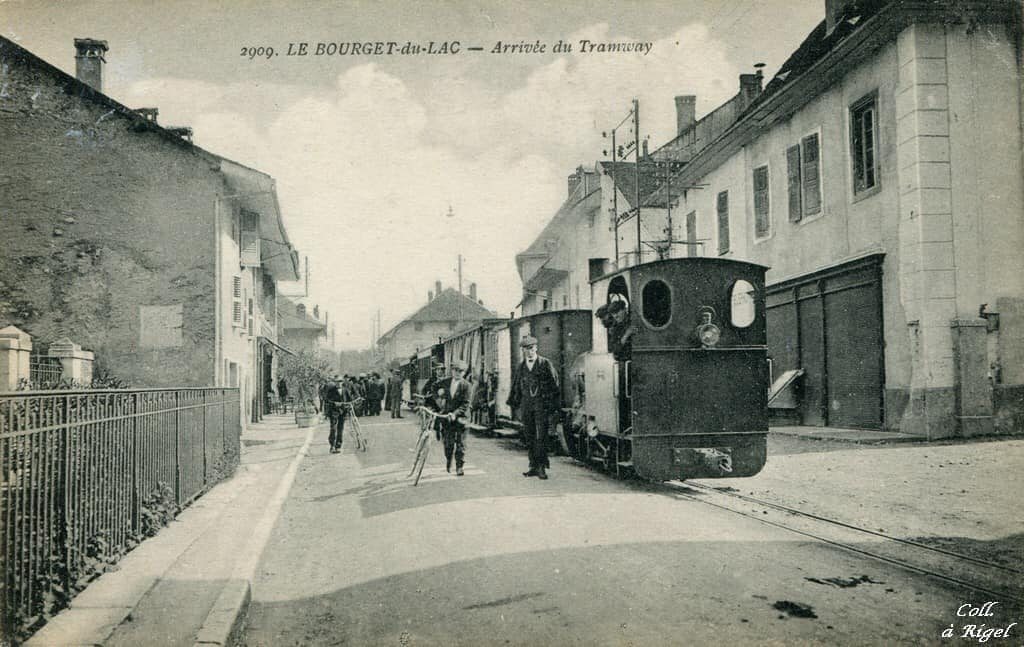
- Buffaud locomotive in La Motte-Servolex Tramway in Le Bourget-du-Lac with O.K locomotive. Owners: • Société Anonyme des Tramways de Savoie (1892-1910) • Conseil général de la Savoie (1910-1932); Operators • Société Anonyme des Tramways de Savoie (1892-1910) • Conseil général de la Savoie (provisionally 1910-1914) • Régie Départementale des tramways de la Savoie (1914-1920) • Chemins de fer Départementaux d’intérêt local de la Savoie (1920-1932)

Technical
- Line length: 31 kilometres (19 mi)
- Track gauge: 600 mm (1 ft 11 5/8 in)
Route map
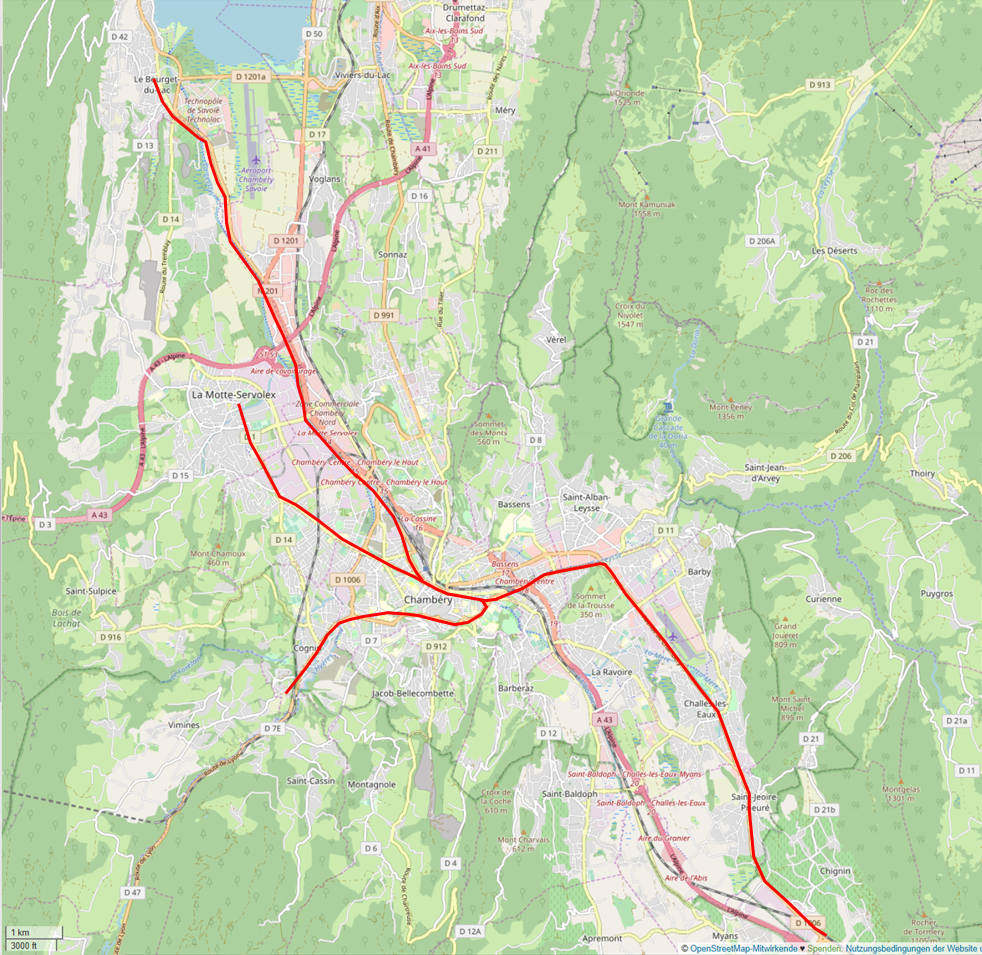
Route of the four lines

The Chambéry tramway was from 1892 to 1932 an up to 31 km (19 mi) long narrow-gauge steam tram network with 33 halts on four lines in Chambéry in Savoy in France.

== History ==
The Chambéry tramway was a network of four lines arranged in a star around the Chambéry railway station in Savoy. It was built at the suggestion of the entrepreneur Philippe Cartier-Million from La Motte-Servolex. Inspired by the Decauville railway at Exposition Universelle (1889), he chose a gauge of 600 mm (1 ft 11 5/8 in), which was unusually narrow at the time.

In October 1890, he obtained the concession for a line between Chambéry and La Motte-Servolex and founded the Société anonyme des Tramways de Savoie. The first tram was put into service on this line in August 1892. Three other lines were opened until 1910: 1897 to Challes-les-Eaux, 1906 to Cognin and 1910 to Le Bourget-du-Lac. In the same year the company filed for bankruptcy.

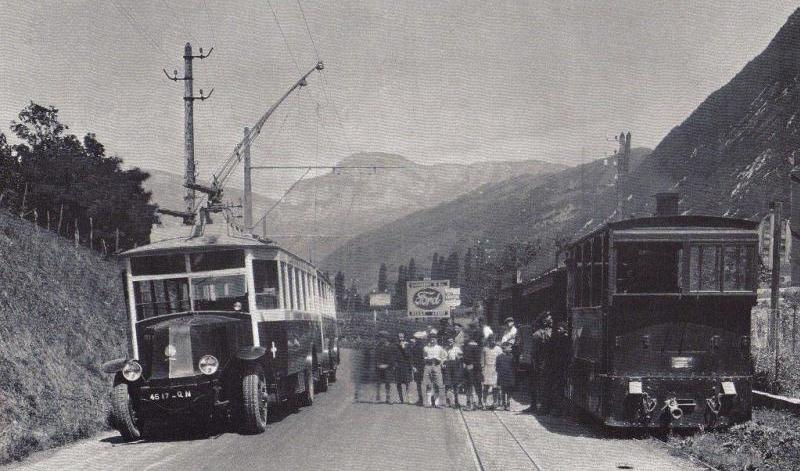
Vétra trolley bus and & Corpet-Louvet steam tram meet around 1929 at Saint-Jeoire-Prieuré

The network was taken over by the Savoie General Council, which reorganized the network and operated it first through an escrow account and then through the Régie Départementale. A decree of 8 February 1913 authorised the Régie Départementale des tramways de la Savoie to take over the operation of the network under "direct management". In 1929, the section between Challes-les-Eaux and Saint-Jeoire-Prieuré was closed down, whereupon the tramway ended up again at its former terminus in front of the Casino, where it had been before the line was extended in 1905.

Due to increasing wear and tear and decreasing traffic, the steam tramway was finally closed down and replaced by a trolleybus between Chambéry and Chignin and by buses on the other lines. The trolleybus was tested between Chambéry and Chignin in July 1930 and finally put into service three months later on 6 October 1930.

This led to the closure of the steam tram on the line to Challes-les-Eaux. The locomotives were mothballed at the Chambéry depot. The rails were lifted and stored on the west side of the hangar of the Challes-les-Eaux airfield and then sold to the Barlet-Ravier company from Chambéry on 21 January 1931. The line to Challes-les-Eaux was decommissioned by a decree of 1 October 1931.

The decision to completely shut down the remaining line to Le Bourget-du-Lac was made on 28 September 1932 and came into force on 1 January 1933.

== Rail vehicles ==
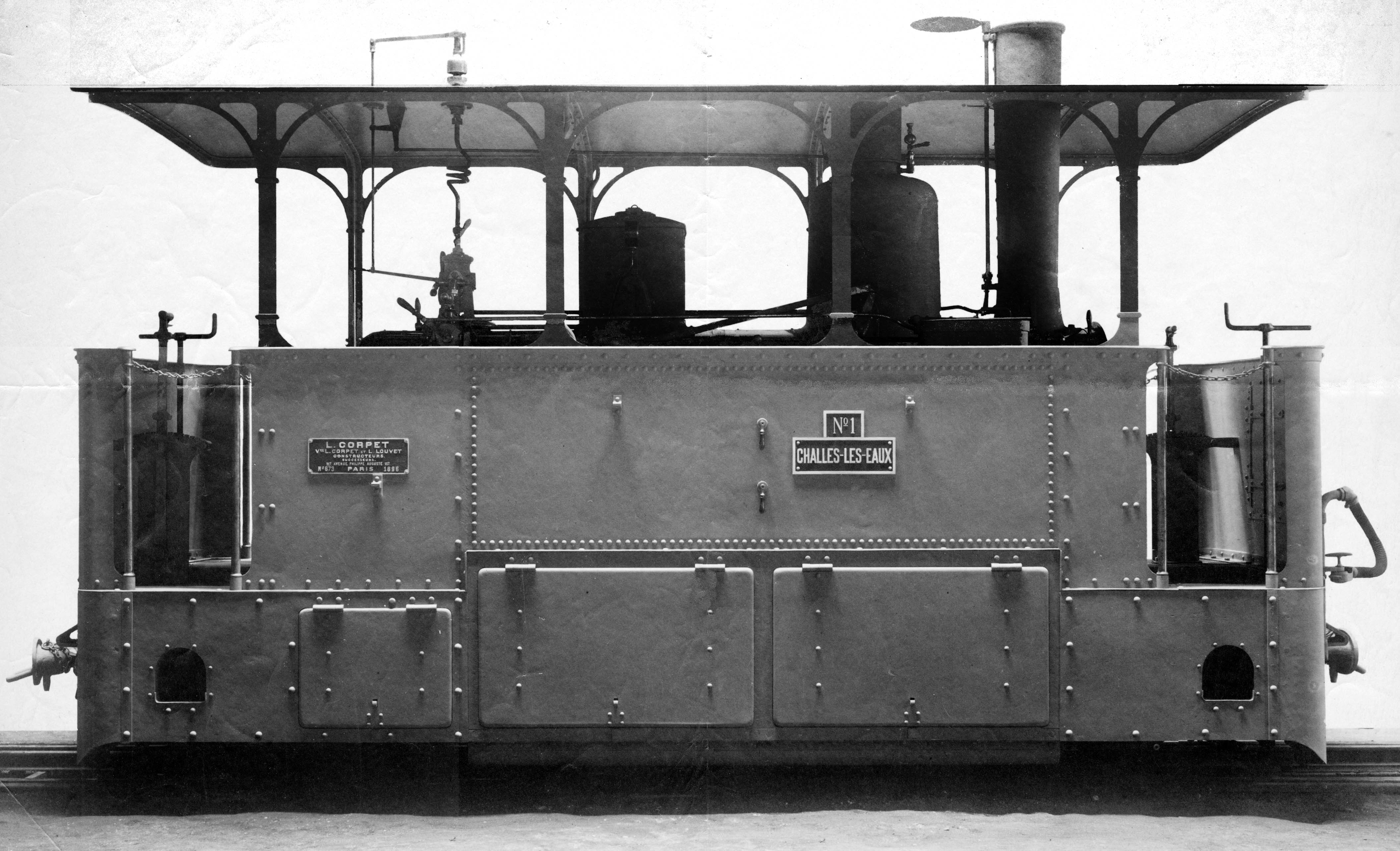
Box locomotive Challes-les-Eaux No 1 by Vve. Corpet - L. Louvet (No 673 of 1896)

- No 1, 0-6-0 delivered on 15 February 1896 by Corpet-Louvet, No 673, Challes-les-Eaux
- No 3, 0-6-0 with two cabs, delivered on 30 July 1894 by Corpet-Louvet, No 623, La Motte Servolex, unladen weight 11.280 t
- No 5, 0-6-0 1905 supplied by Buffaud and Robatel, empty weight 10 tons
- No 6, 0-6-0 1905 supplied by Buffaud and Robatel, empty weight 10 tons
- 0-4-0 Weidknecht, No. 552, SLM boiler No. 553 [9]
- 0-4-0 Weidknecht, No. 553, SLM Boiler No. 5
- 0-6-0 Buffaud & Robatel, empty weight 9 t
- 0-4-0 Orenstein & Koppel
- 2 railcars with 2 axles
- 2 railcars with bogies
- Open and closed bogie passenger and freight wagons
