= Canton of Chambéry-1 =

Coordinates: 45.58°N 5.90°E

The canton of Chambéry-1 is an administrative division of the Savoie department, southeastern France. It was created at the French canton reorganisation which came into effect in March 2015. Its seat is in Chambéry.

It consists of the following communes:

1. Chambéry (partly)
2. Sonnaz
