= Hôtel de Ville, Chambéry =

Town hall in Chambéry, France

Hôtel de Ville
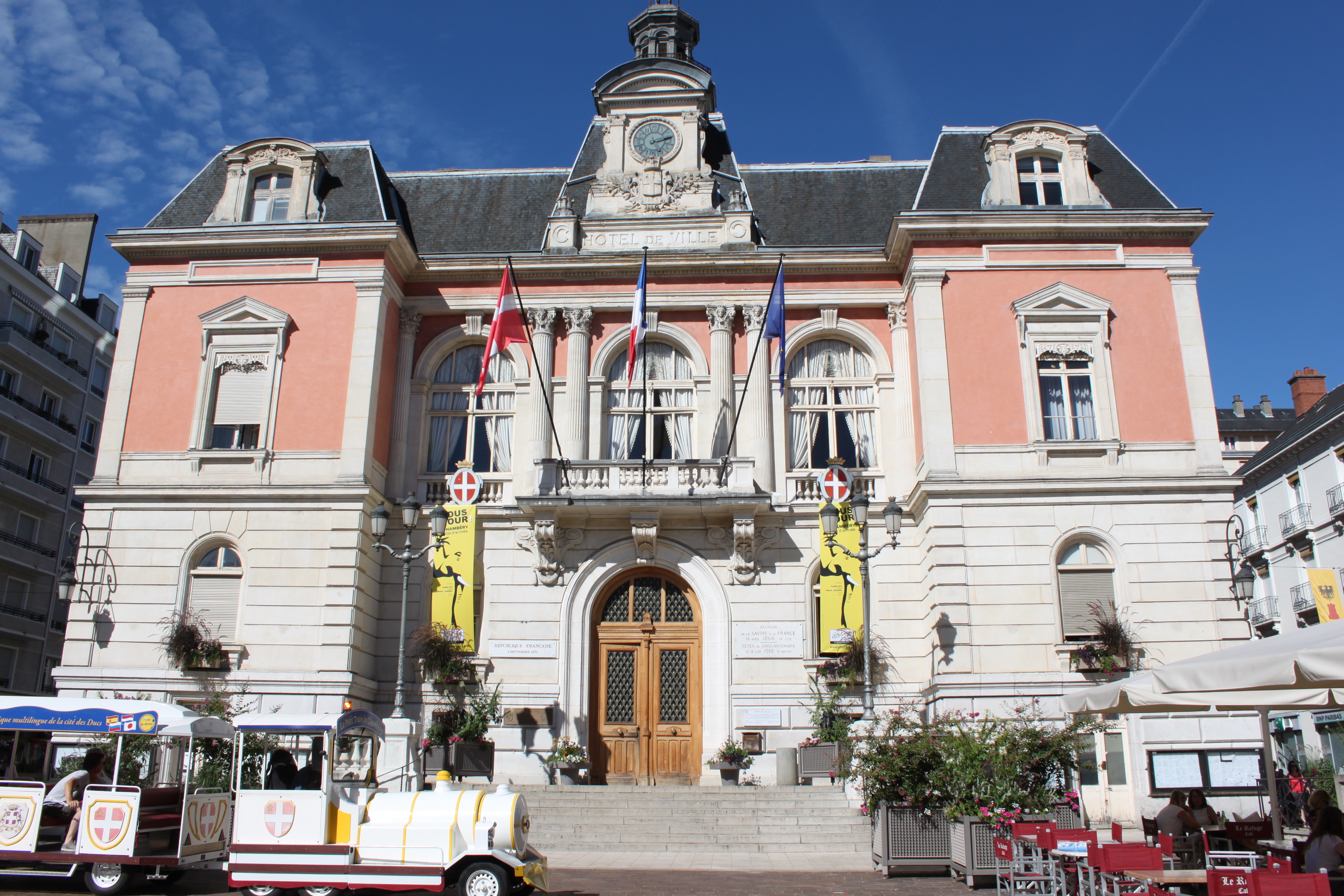
- The main frontage of the Hôtel de Ville in July 2017
- Interactive map of the Hôtel de Ville area

General information
- Type: City hall
- Architectural style: Neoclassical style
- Location: Chambéry, France
- Coordinates: 45.5665°N 5.9207°E
- Completed: 1867

Design and construction
- Architects: Charles-Bernard Pellegrini and Joseph Samuel Revel

The Hôtel de Ville (French pronunciation: [otɛl də vil], City Hall) is a municipal building in Chambéry, Savoie, southeastern France, standing on Rue Favre.

== History ==
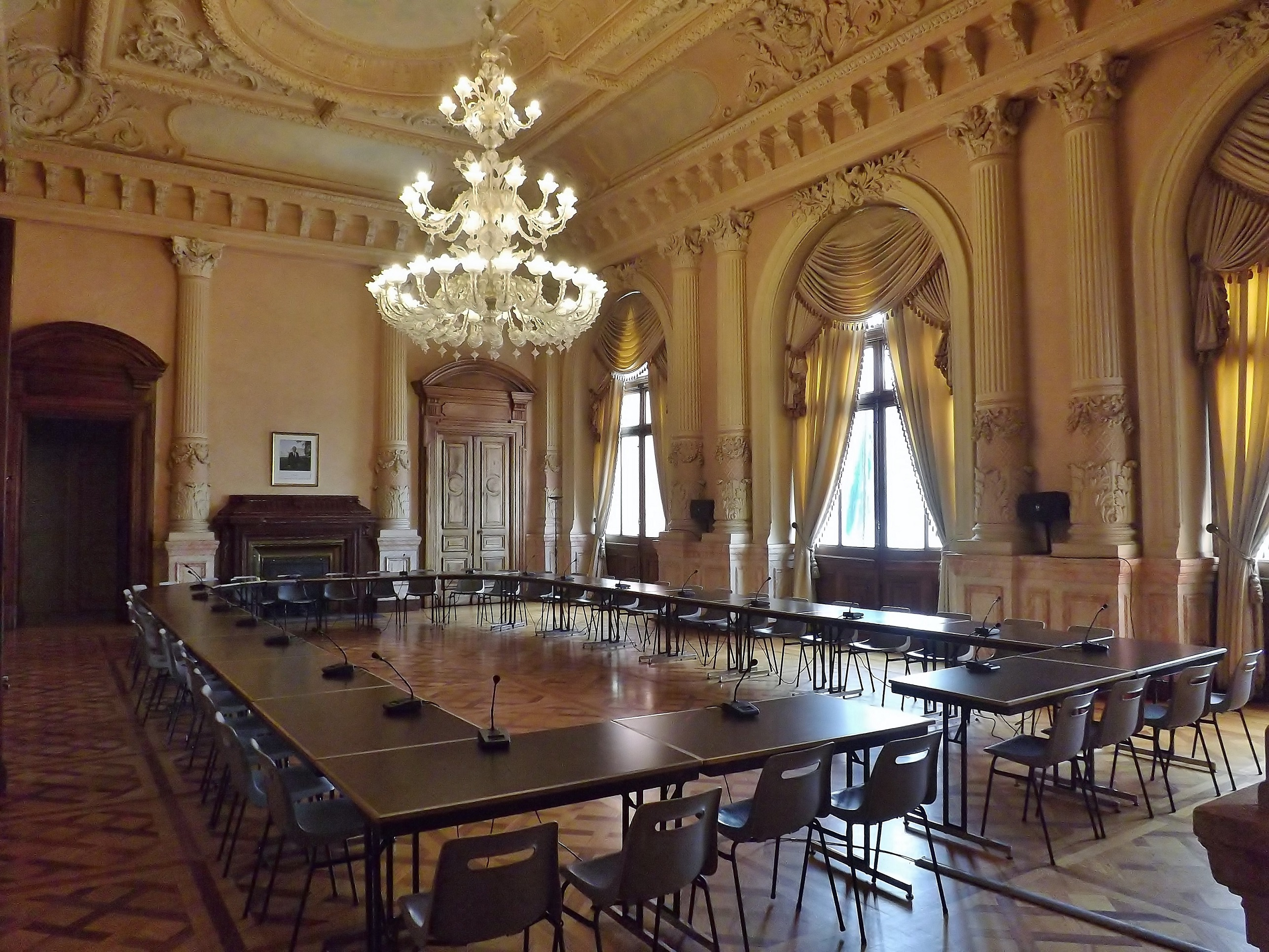
The Salle du Conseil

The first municipal building, which was in the historic centre of Chambéry, dated back at least to the early 14th century. Referred to as the Maison de la Cité (the City House), it was the place where the church council met and the bishop of Grenoble also had an office there. A library and a rudimentary collection of art, endowed by the Abbot of Mellarède, was established and opened to the public in one of the rooms on the first floor of the building in 1783. This collection later developed to become the Musée des beaux-arts (the Museum of Fine Art).

By the mid-19th century, the Maison de la Cité had become dilapidated and had to be demolished. The city council moved, with the local archives, to temporary accommodation in the municipal theatre. However, on the night of 12 February 1864, a major fire developed which took hold in the upper floors and roof of the theatre. All the archives created since 1810 were destroyed in the conflagration.

Shortly after Savoy had been ceded by the Kingdom of Sardinia to France under the Treaty of Turin in 1860, the council, led by a new mayor, Baron Frédéric d'Alexandry d'Orengiani, decided to commission a new town hall. The site it selected had been occupied by L'église des Antonins. Construction of the new building started in 1863. It was designed by Charles-Bernard Pellegrini and Joseph Samuel Revel in the neoclassical style, built in ashlar stone and was officially opened on 15 August 1867.

The design involved a symmetrical main frontage of five bays facing onto Rue Favre with the end bays projected forward as pavilions. The ground floor was rusticated. The central section of three bays featured a short flight of steps leading up to a round headed doorway with a moulded surround and a keystone. On the first floor, there were three round headed windows with moulded surrounds and keystones. The central window had a balcony with a stone balustrade and was flanked by paired Corinthian order columns, while the other two windows had balustrades and were flanked by single Corinthian order columns, which supported an entablature and a modillioned cornice. The central bay was surmounted by a clock with a round headed pediment, and, behind the clock, there was a two-stage octagonal belfry. The other bays were fenestrated by round headed windows on the ground floor, and by casement windows with pediments on the first floor, and there were dormer windows at attic level in the outer bays. The sculpture on the outside of the building was the work of Louis Auguste Delécole. Internally, the principal room was the Salle du Conseil (council chamber) which featured a fine plaster ceiling, a large chandelier and a marquetry floor: it was restored in 1990.

Following the liberation of the town on 22 August 1944, during the Second World War, the chairman of the Provisional Government of the French Republic, General Charles de Gaulle, visited the town hall before attending a reception in the prefecture on 5 November 1944. The president of France, Jacques Chirac, visited the town hall and supported by the mayor, André Gilbertas, inspected a guard of honour, on 4 May 2000.
