= Cognin =

Cognin Konyin (Savoyard)
- Commune
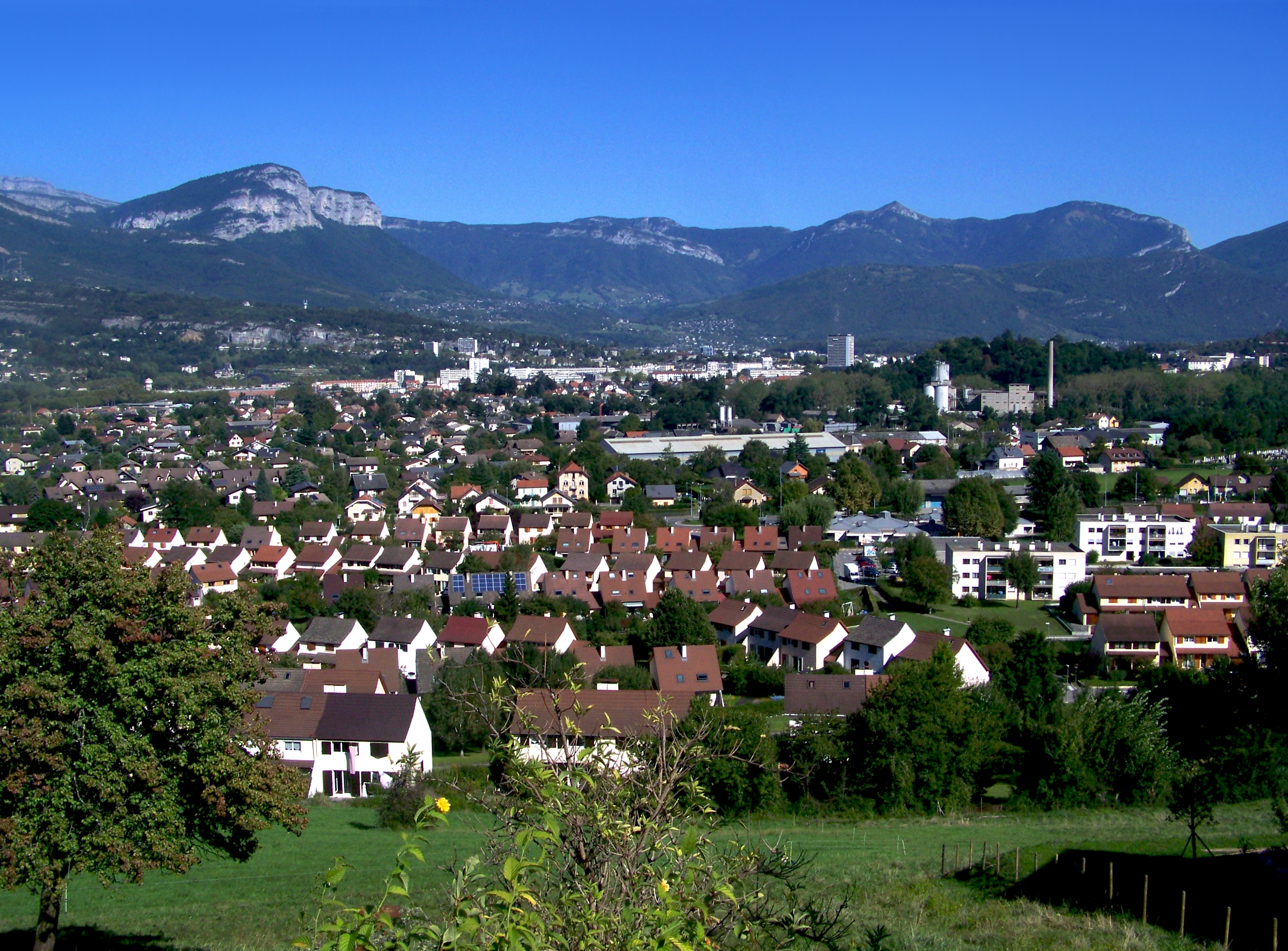
- A general view of Cognin

- Coat of arms
- Location of Cognin
- Location within France Location within Auvergne-Rhône-Alpes
- Coordinates: 45°33′47″N 5°54′00″E
- Country: France
- Region: Auvergne-Rhône-Alpes
- Department: Savoie
- Arrondissement: Chambéry
- Canton: Chambéry-3
- Intercommunality: Grand Chambéry

Government
  - Mayor (2020–2026): Franck Morat
- Area^{1}: 4.48 km^{2} (1.73 sq mi)
- Elevation: 299 m (981 ft)
- Highest elevation: 451 m (1,480 ft)
- Lowest elevation: 269 m (883 ft)
- Population (2023): 6,954
  - Density: 1,550/km^{2} (4,020/sq mi)
- Time zone: UTC+01:00 (CET)
  - Summer (DST): UTC+02:00 (CEST)
- INSEE/Postal code: 73087 /73160
- Website: www.cognin.fr
- ^{1} French Land Register data, which excludes lakes, ponds, glaciers > 1 km^{2} (0.386 sq mi or 247 acres) and river estuaries.

Cognin (French pronunciation: [kɔɲɛ̃]; Savoyard: Konyin) is a commune in the Savoie department in the Auvergne-Rhône-Alpes region in south-eastern France.

== Geography ==
The river Hyères forms the commune's western border.

== Population ==
Historical population
| Year | Pop. | ±% p.a. |
|---|---|---|
| 1968 | 3,995 | — |
| 1975 | 5,397 | +4.39% |
| 1982 | 6,085 | +1.73% |
| 1990 | 5,779 | −0.64% |
| 1999 | 5,900 | +0.23% |
| 2007 | 5,857 | −0.09% |
| 2012 | 5,920 | +0.21% |
| 2017 | 6,204 | +0.94% |
| 2023 | 6,954 | +1.92% |
Source: INSEE

== See also ==
- Communes of the Savoie department
