= Jacob-Bellecombette =

Jacob-Bellecombette Zhoko (Savoyard)
- Commune
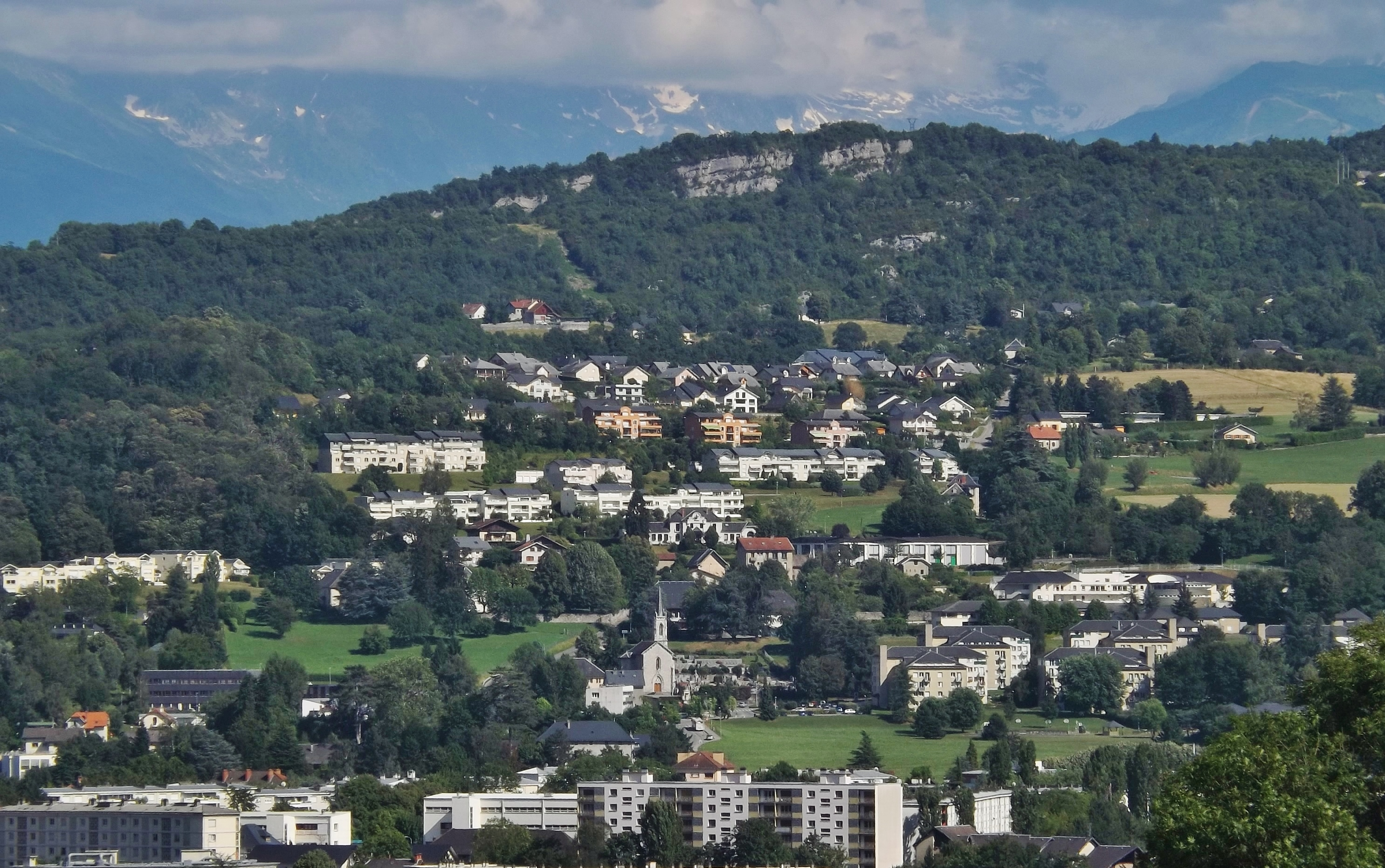
- Panoramic sight of the commune.
- Location of Jacob-Bellecombette
- Location within France Location within Auvergne-Rhône-Alpes
- Coordinates: 45°33′30″N 5°54′36″E
- Country: France
- Region: Auvergne-Rhône-Alpes
- Department: Savoie
- Arrondissement: Chambéry
- Canton: Chambéry-2
- Intercommunality: Grand Chambéry

Government
  - Mayor (2020–2026): Brigitte Bochaton
- Area^{1}: 2.47 km^{2} (0.95 sq mi)
- Highest elevation: 576 m (1,890 ft)
- Lowest elevation: 290 m (950 ft)
- Population (2023): 4,499
  - Density: 1,820/km^{2} (4,720/sq mi)
- Time zone: UTC+01:00 (CET)
  - Summer (DST): UTC+02:00 (CEST)
- INSEE/Postal code: 73137 /73000
- Website: www.jacob-bellecombette.fr
- ^{1} French Land Register data, which excludes lakes, ponds, glaciers > 1 km^{2} (0.386 sq mi or 247 acres) and river estuaries.

Jacob-Bellecombette (Savoyard: Zhoko) is a commune in the Savoie department in the Auvergne-Rhône-Alpes region in south-eastern France.

== Population ==
Historical population
Year	Pop.	±% p.a.
1968	1,074	—
1975	2,410	+12.24%
1982	2,420	+0.06%
1990	2,592	+0.86%
1999	3,584	+3.67%
2007	3,929	+1.16%
2012	3,870	−0.30%
2017	3,984	+0.58%
2023	4,499	+2.05%
Source: INSEE

== See also ==
- Communes of the Savoie department
