= Conjux =

Conjux Konzhu (Arpitan)
- Commune
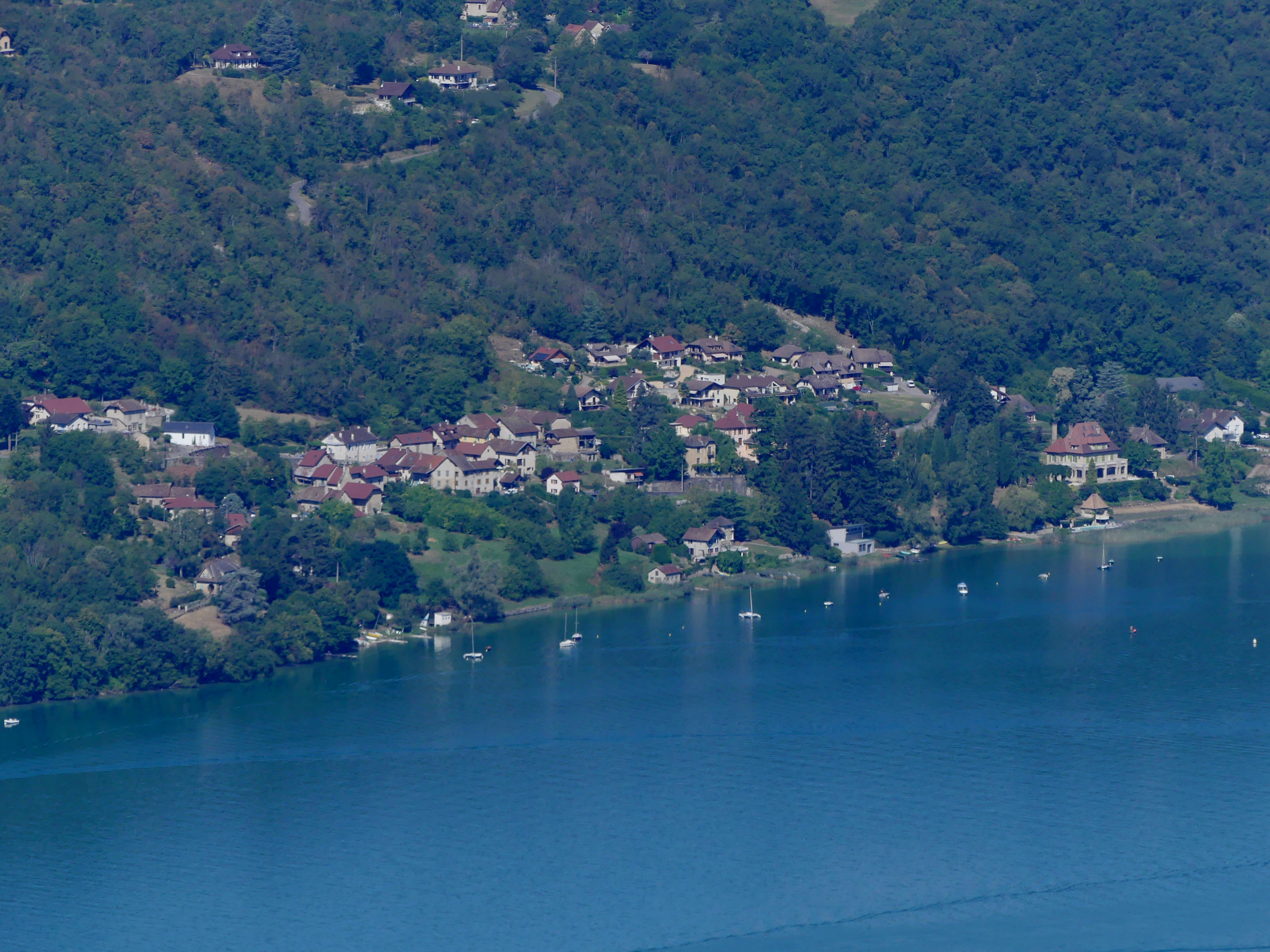
- Location of Conjux
- Location within France Location within Auvergne-Rhône-Alpes
- Coordinates: 45°47′29″N 5°49′20″E
- Country: France
- Region: Auvergne-Rhône-Alpes
- Department: Savoie
- Arrondissement: Chambéry
- Canton: Bugey savoyard
- Intercommunality: CA Grand Lac

Government
  - Mayor (2026–32): Nathalie Pochat
- Area^{1}: 1.7 km^{2} (0.66 sq mi)
- Highest elevation: 443 m (1,453 ft)
- Lowest elevation: 225 m (738 ft)
- Population (2023): 218
  - Density: 130/km^{2} (330/sq mi)
- Time zone: UTC+01:00 (CET)
  - Summer (DST): UTC+02:00 (CEST)
- INSEE/Postal code: 73091 /73310
- ^{1} French Land Register data, which excludes lakes, ponds, glaciers > 1 km^{2} (0.386 sq mi or 247 acres) and river estuaries.

Conjux (French: [kɔ̃ʒy]; Arpitan: Konzhu) is a commune in the Savoie department in the Auvergne-Rhône-Alpes region in southeastern France. Since January 2017, the commune has formed part of the conurbation of Grand Lac, following the fusion of the former Communauté de communes de Chautagne into this larger agglomeration.

At 175 ha, the smallest commune in the region of Chautagne, Conjux extends for 5 km along the northwestern coastline of Lac du Bourget; it is bounded to the north by the Canal de Savières and backed by Mount Landard to the west. The commune of Conjux includes the hamlets of La Chatière, Portout and Semelas. Conjux is notable for its prehistoric pile-dwelling remains (part of a UNESCO World Heritage Site), Gallo-Roman artifacts including a Cybele altar in the local chapel, and humanitarian acts during World War II. Reflecting its mixed role as a residential and recreational location, 42% of its residential buildings are counted as secondary residences.

== Toponym ==
The name of the commune is believed to be derived, via the forms 'Conziacum' (early 12th Century), 'Conjiacum' (1481) and 'Conjeux' (1780), from late Latin 'Congiacum', meaning the 'domain of Congius.' Its derivation is not related to the Latin homonym, 'conjux' (spouse).

As with many polysyllabic Arpitan toponyms or anthroponyms, the final -x marks oxytonic stress (on the last syllable), whereas the final -z indicates paroxytonic stress (on the penultimate syllable) and should not be pronounced, although in French it is often mispronounced due to hypercorrection.

== Geography ==
Conjux is situated on the western shore of Lac du Bourget, about 35 km north of Chambéry. Its elevation ranges from 225 m at the lakeshore to 443 m on the slopes of Mont Landard. The commune is classified as a commune littorale under French coastal protection laws, which impose specific urban planning restrictions to preserve natural landscapes and ecological balance along the 100-meter shoreline band.

According to the Corine Land Cover data (2018), land use consists primarily of continental waters (56.5%), forests and semi-natural areas (21.7%), grasslands (10%), urbanized zones (7.7%), and inland wetlands (4.1%). The Biez rivulet, partially restored as part of the recent Port-Plage project, flows into the lake.

Climate: The area experiences a temperate climate with mountain influences (Köppen Cfb or mountain-margin type), with average annual precipitation around 1,200–1,500 mm.

== Economic activity ==
Fishing was traditionally the mainstay of the village, but today only two professional fishermen are based in the commune. The recently expanded Port of Conjux is now largely used for recreational boating and amateur fishing. Economic activity is largely confined to small businesses, including a burgeoning supply of holiday accommodation and a restaurant, and salaried work in nearby cities such as Aix-les-Bains and Chambéry. The commune maintains a municipal camping ground, Les Babelles, and a bathing beach, as well as managing the boating harbour. The commune recently also undertook a major plan to redevelop the port and beach area, the 'Port-Plage' project, entailing enlargement of the port, opening up of the Biez rivulet (previously partially piped underground to the lake) to restore the natural waterway, and improvements to tourist and fishing facilities.

Conjux has been the location for filming a number of cinematic and television films, including the current productions La Maison de Nos Rêves and Le Roman de Marceau Miller.

== History ==
=== Prehistory ===
Human occupation of the Conjux area dates back to at least the protohistoric period. The underwater archaeological site Conjux-le-Port-3 (also associated with Conjux 1 / Baie de Conjux-Portout) forms part of the UNESCO World Heritage Site "Prehistoric Pile Dwellings around the Alps. The site was classified as an historical monument in 2011. This serial property comprises 111 sites across six countries and provides exceptional evidence of early agrarian societies from the Neolithic to the Bronze Age.

At Conjux-le-Port-3, Dendrochronological analysis dates wooden structures to approximately 832–813 BCE (Final Bronze Age), comprising prehistoric pile dwellings around the Alps. The site preserves visible alignments of piles and a clear layout of Late Bronze Age buildings, offering insights into village organization, architecture, and interaction with the lake environment. Lake levels were approximately 2 meters lower during parts of the Gallo-Roman period.

=== Antiquity ===
In the Gallo-Roman era, Portout hosted a pottery production site (active in the 3rd century CE) and what appears to have been a small port near the entrance to the Canal de Savières. Excavations (1976–1983) recovered artifacts now displayed at the Musée Gallo-Romain in neighbouring Chanaz. The Chapel of Saints-Crépin-et-Crépinien houses related finds, including an inscribed funerary stone and an altar dedicated to the goddess Cybele (Magna Mater), attesting to the presence of her mystery cult in the region.

=== World War Two ===
Under German occupation during the Second World War, Conjux is remembered for two contrasting humanitarian acts. In March 1943, a German military plane crashed in Lac du Bourget while on a training flight. Fishermen from Conjux rescued the two surviving crew who were then sheltered by local families despite misgivings about giving aid to the occupying military; offers of financial rewards were refused, and four prisoners of war were later released as a reciprocal gesture. The incident is portrayed in the 2013 film of France-based German film maker Anja Unger, L'Avion du Lac. During the Nazi occupation, Conjuxiens Félix and Marie Maurier sheltered a young Jewish girl, Liliane Kuhn, presenting her as their grandchild. She survived the holocaust, and her protectors were subsequently recognised as Righteous Among the Nations.

== Chapel ==
The chapel of Saints-Crépin-et-Crépinien at Conjux dates in part from the 15th century. Formerly a parish church, it was not restored to that status following the reestablishment of worship after the Concordat of 1801. It was established as a vicarial chapel in 1883. The building was badly damaged in an earthquake in 1826, fell in ruins in 1886, and was restored in several stages (1890, 1938 and 1978). The rebuilt neoGothic nave has a ribbed vault, linked to a side chapel comprising remains of the 15th Century building. The interior includes a polished wood statue of the Madonna and Child from the 14th Century and Gallo-Roman remains including an inscribed funerary stone and the altar of Cybele.

== Images ==
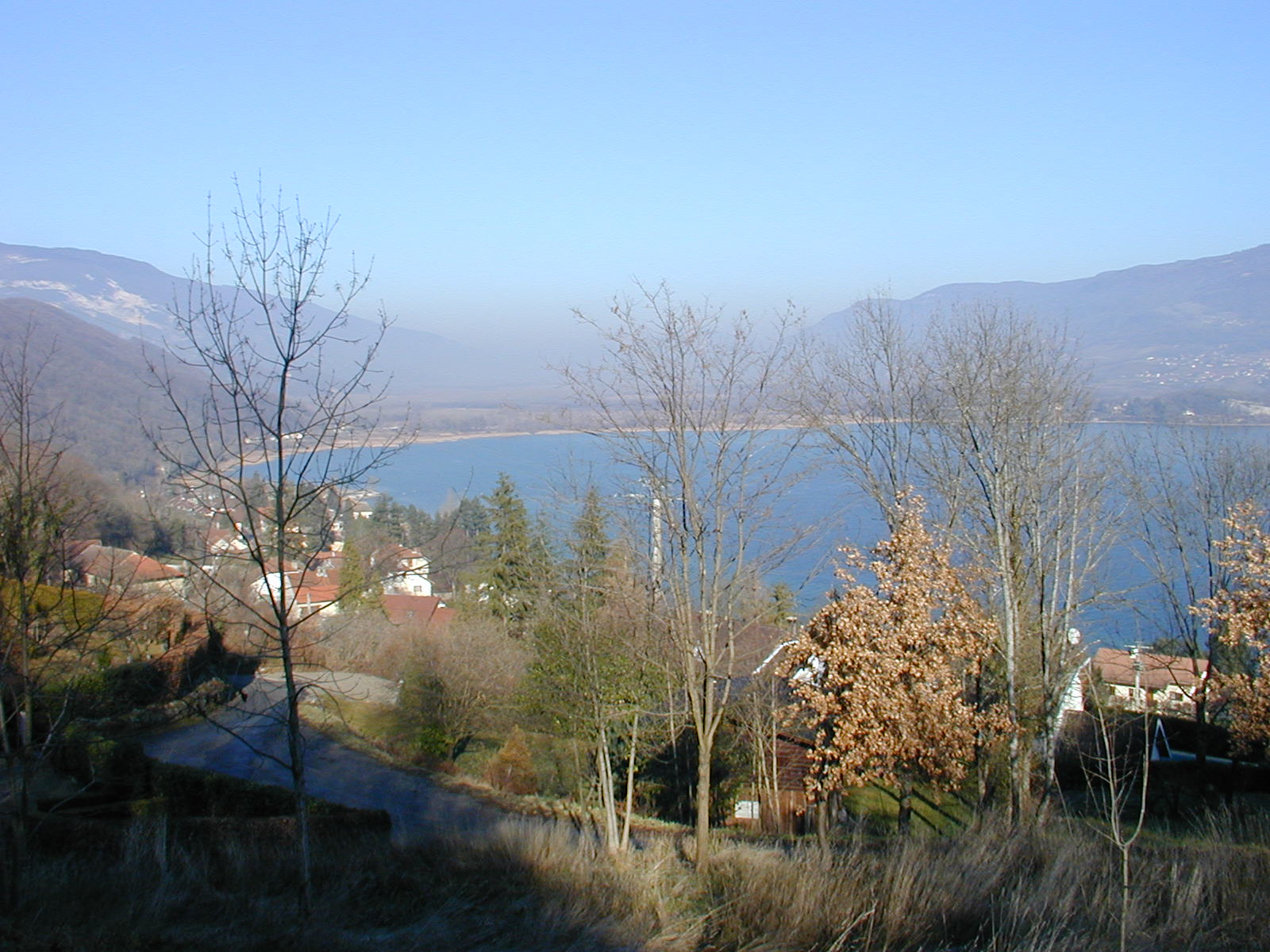
Lac du Bourget as seen from Conjux

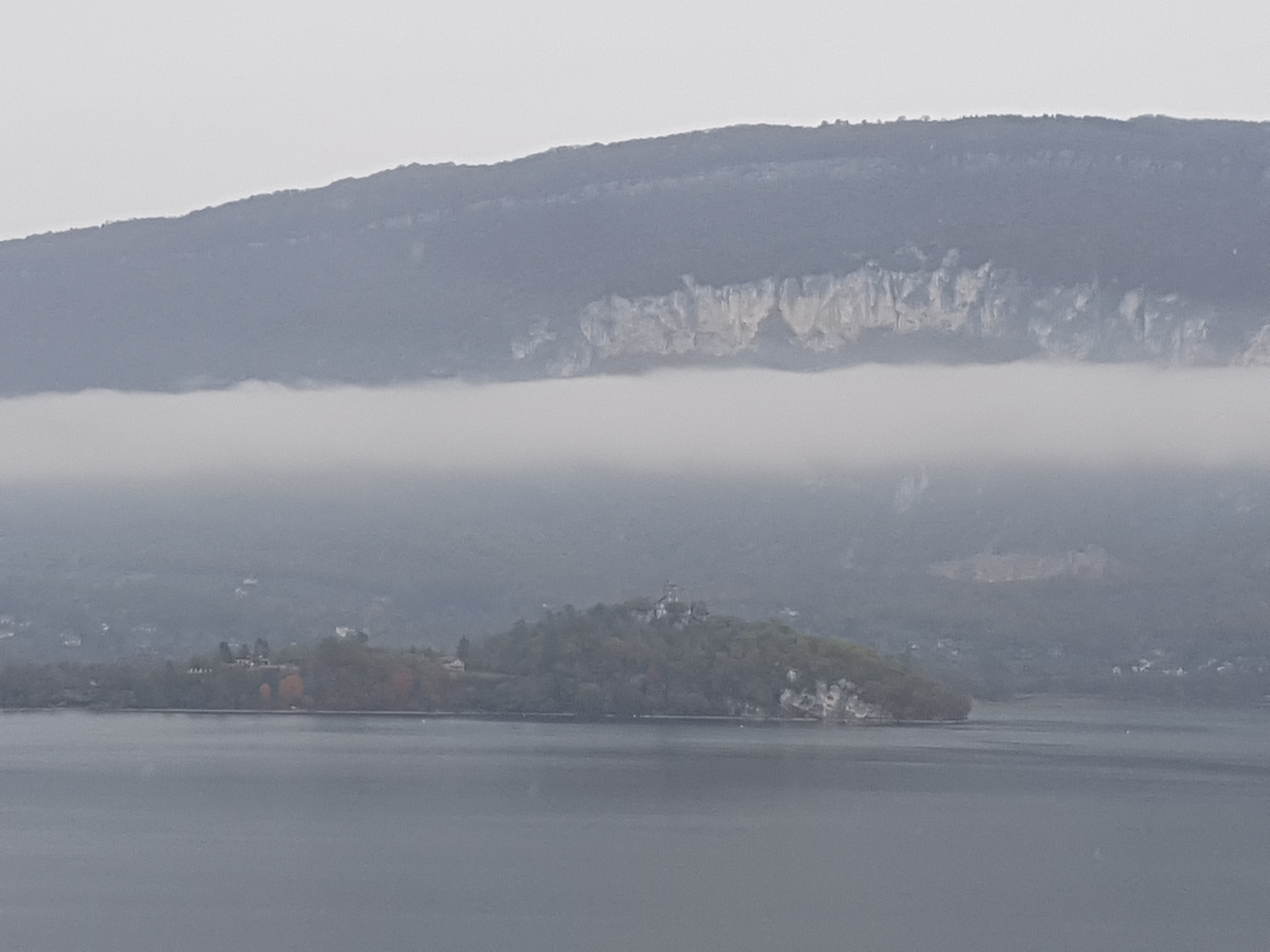
Chatillon and Lac du Bourget as seen from Conjux

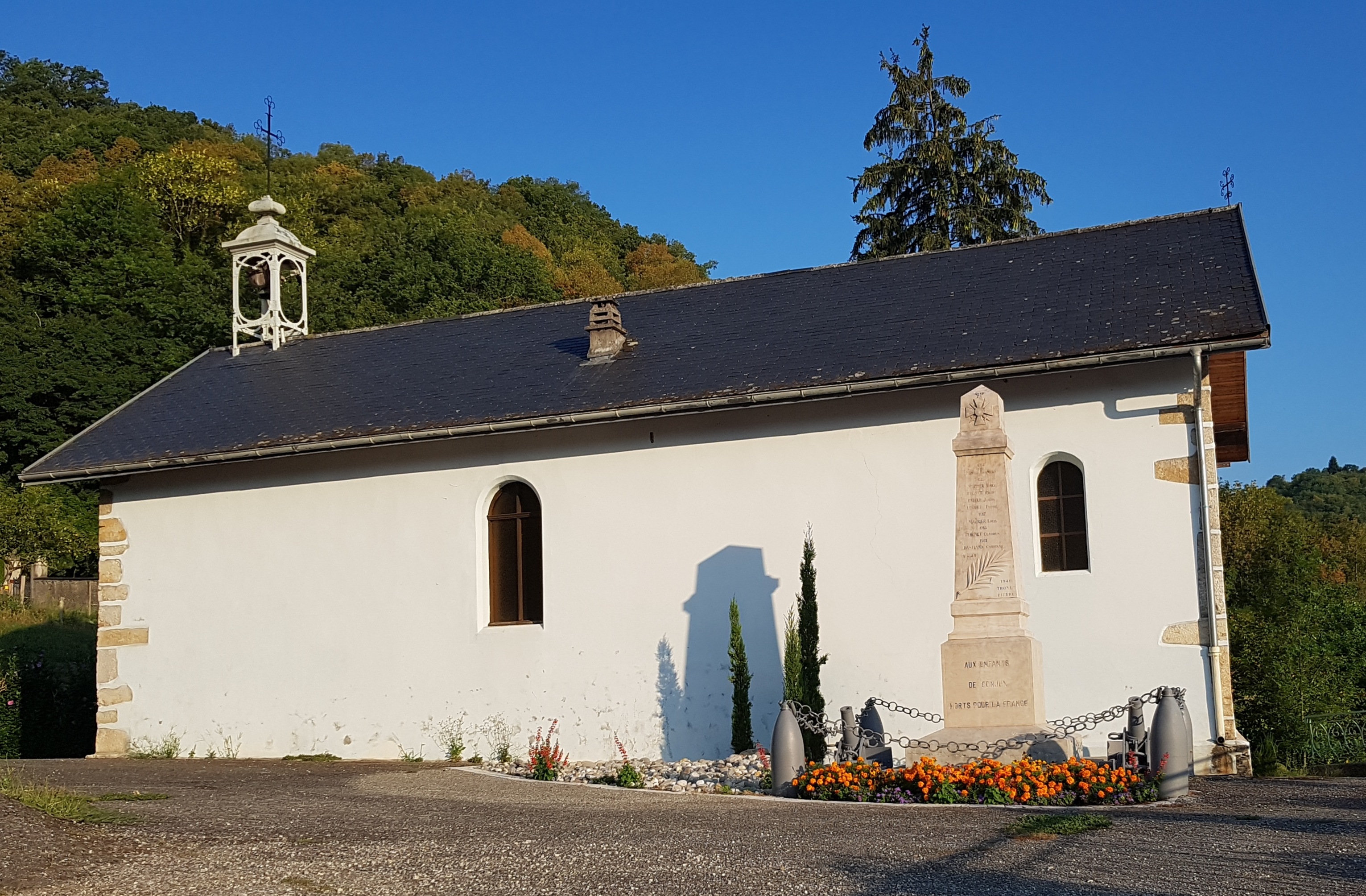
Chapel of Saints-Crépin-et-Crépinien and war memorial, Conjux

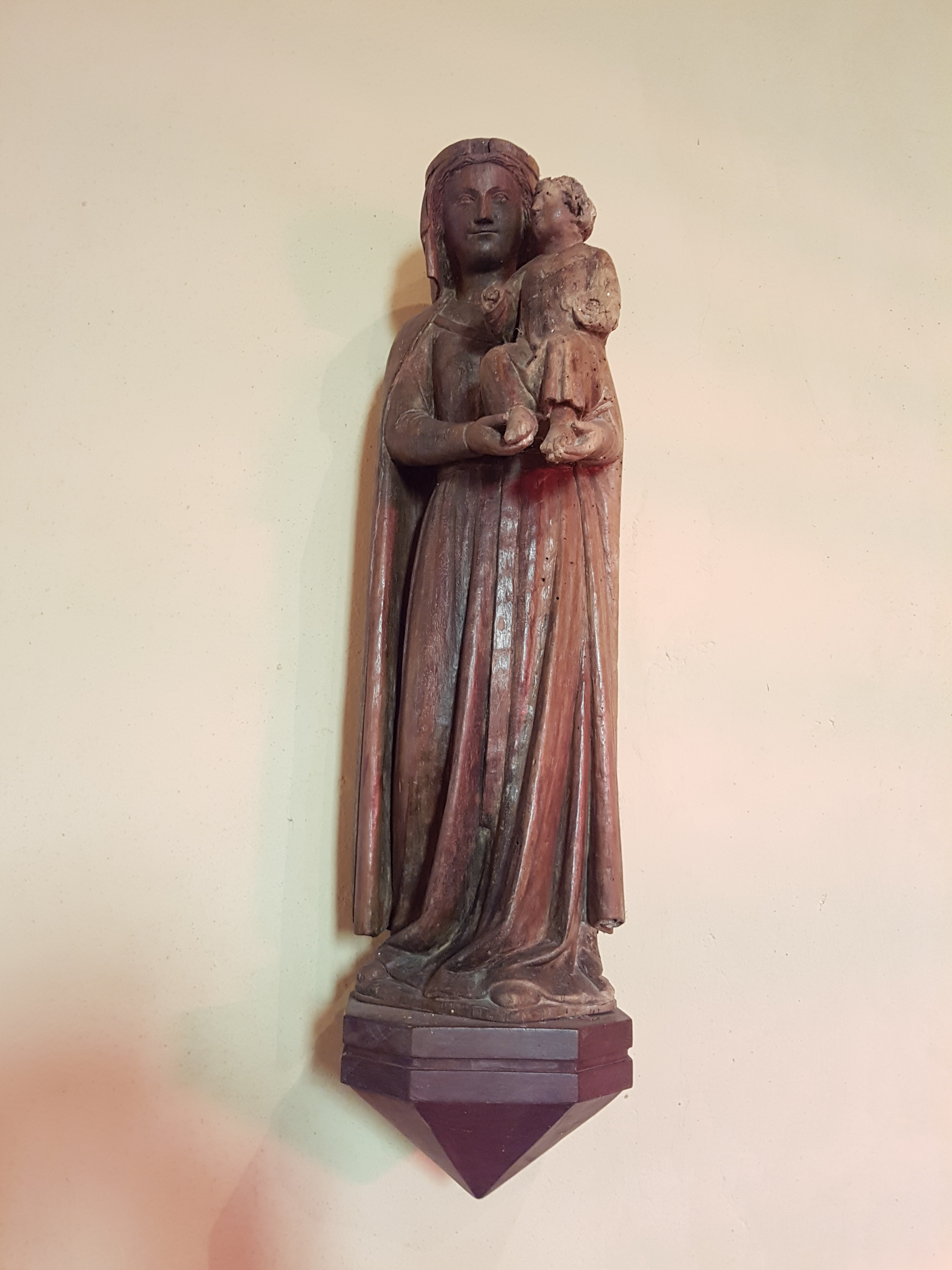
Wooden Madonna, interior of the Chapel of Saints-Crépin-et-Crépinien, Conjux

== See also ==
- Communes of the Savoie department
