= Leysse =

River which crosses the city of Chambéry

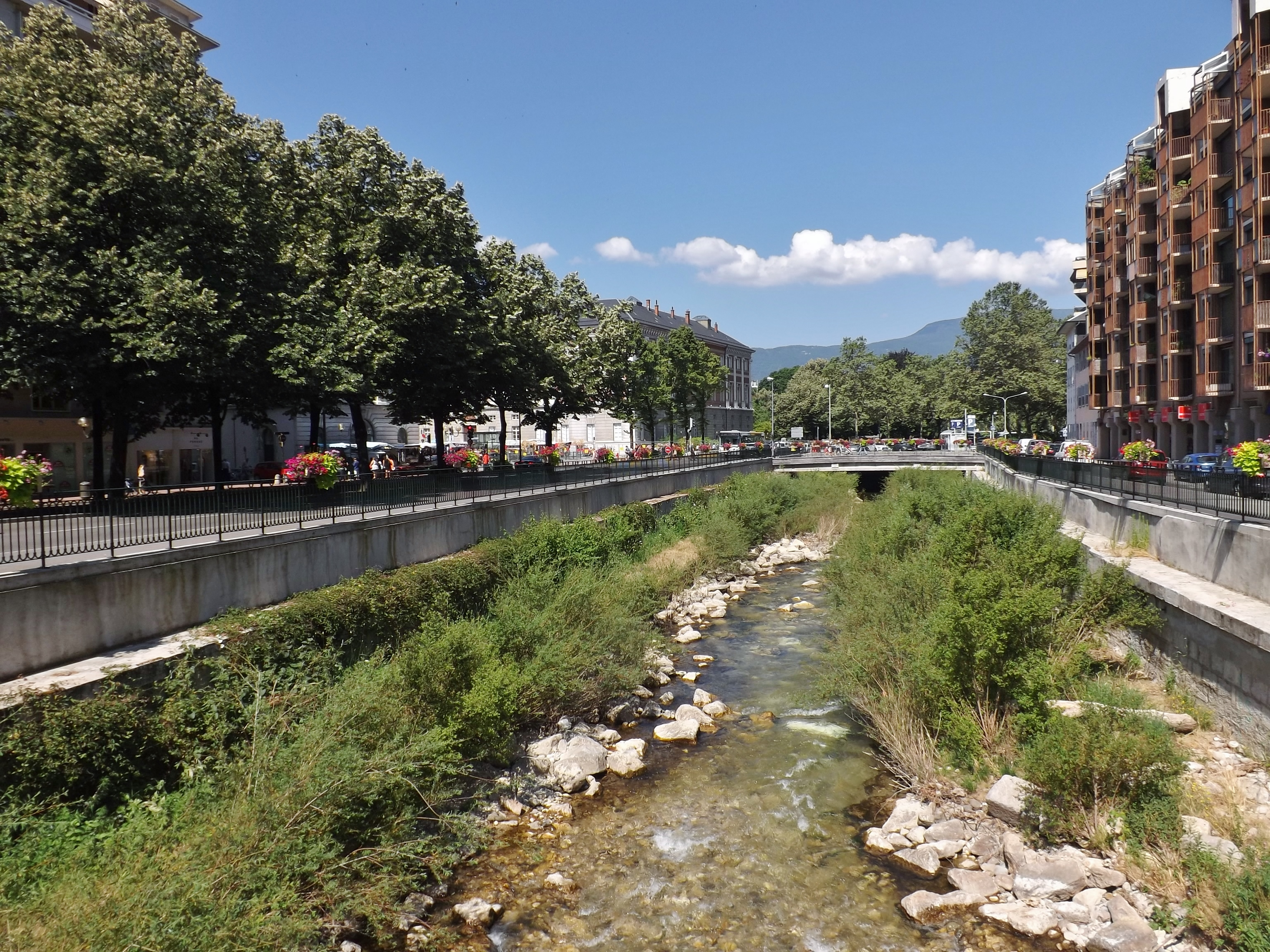
- River Leysse in Chambéry downtown

- Location within France Location within Auvergne-Rhône-Alpes

Location
- Country: France

Physical characteristics
- Mouth: Lac du Bourget
  - coordinates: 45.6558°N 5.8673°E
- Length: 29 km (18 mi)

Basin features
- Progression: Canal de Savières→ Rhône→ Mediterranean Sea

The Leysse is the river which crosses the city of Chambéry, Savoie, France. At its entrance into the city, it goes underground in a channel of about one kilometer.

== Characteristics ==
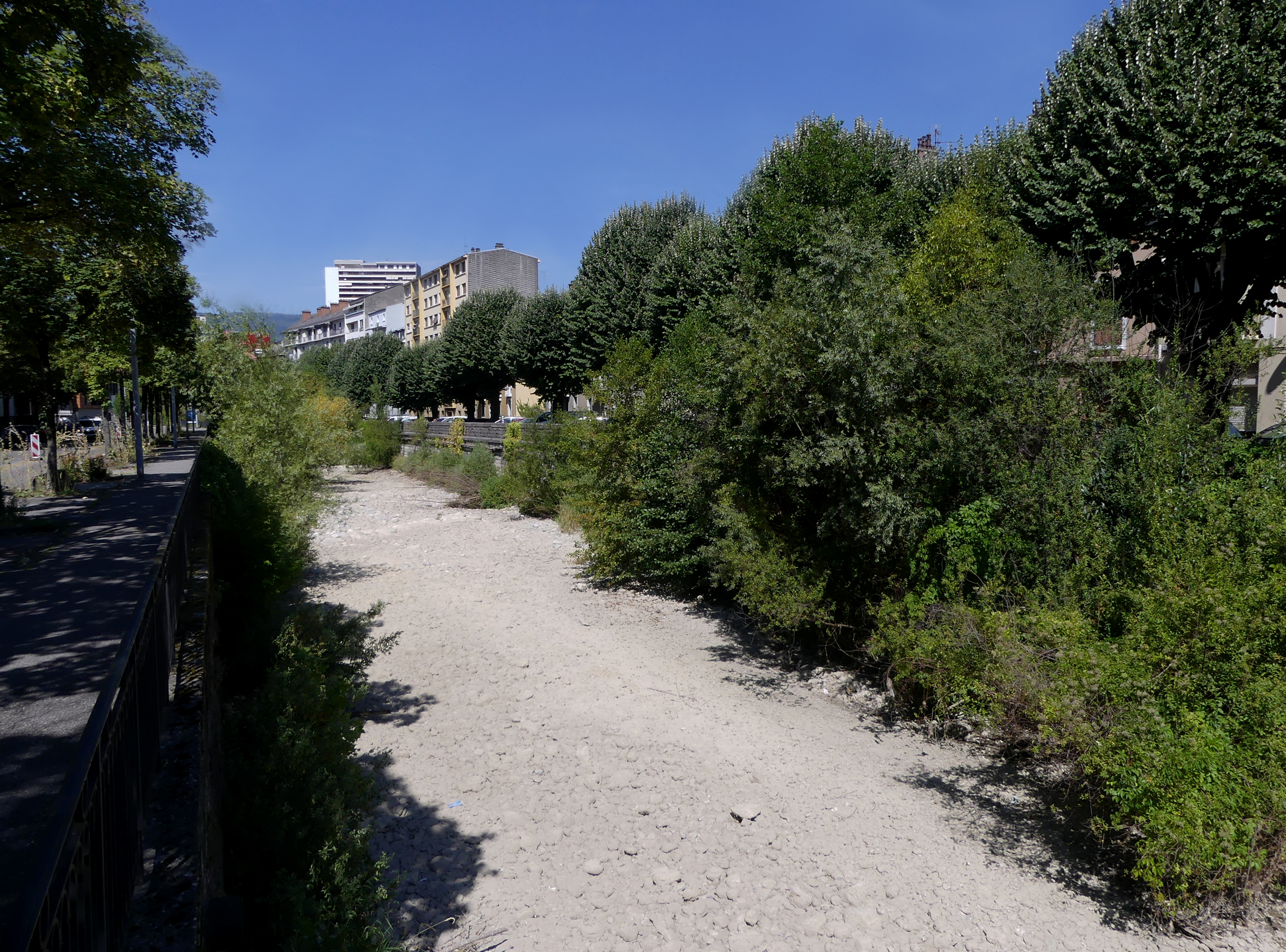
The Leysse on 28 July 2022 during the 2022 European drought.

It comes from the mountains east of Chambéry, and continues to the north, until falling into the Lake of Le Bourget in the city of Le Bourget-du-Lac. The total length of the river is 28.5 km (17.7 mi). The Lac du Bourget is drained by the Canal de Savières towards the Rhône.

== See also ==
- List of rivers of France
