= Le Bourget-du-Lac =

- Commune
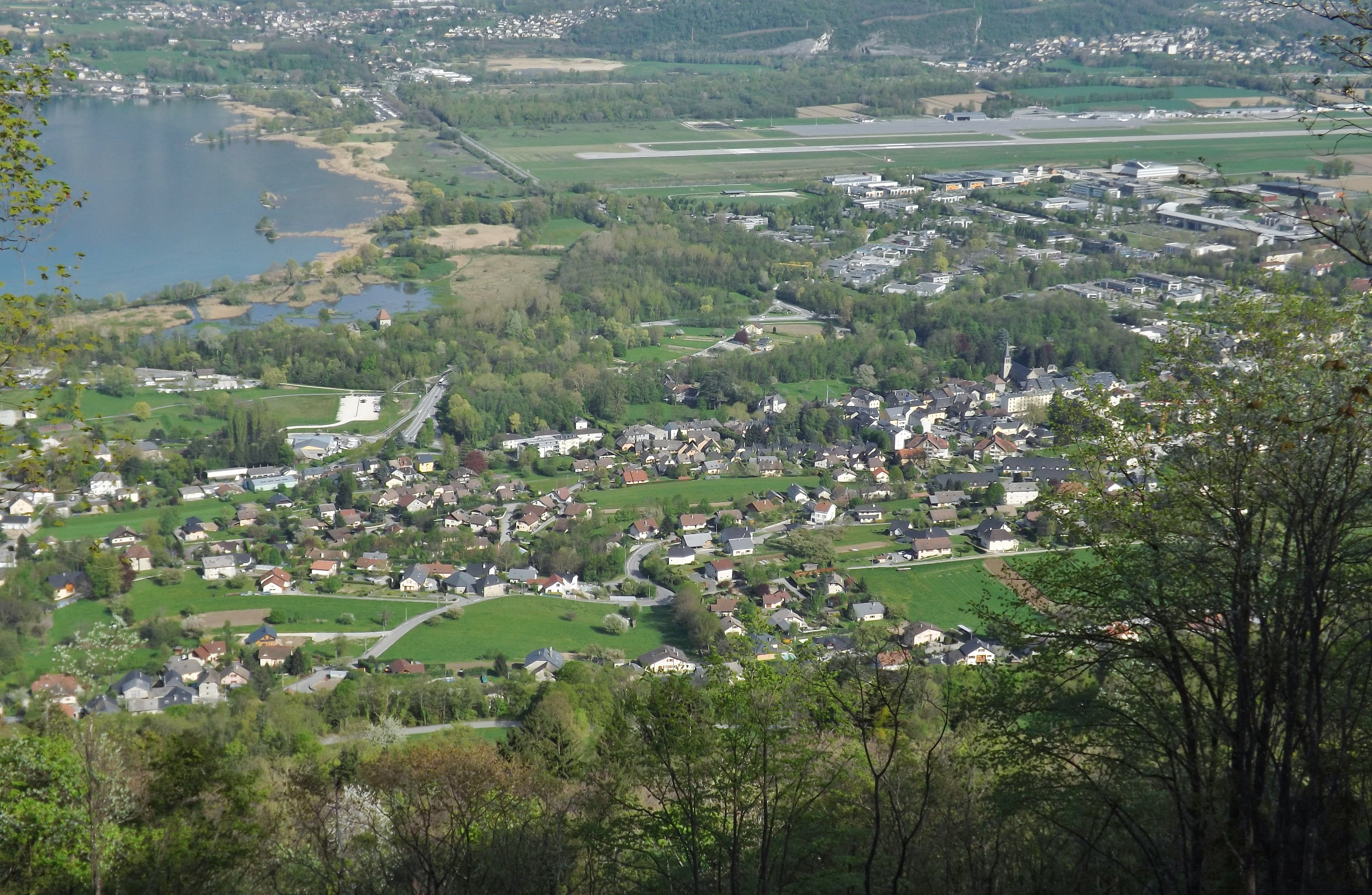
- Le Bourget-du-Lac, with the Lac du Bourget, Savoie Technolac, and Chambéry Airport

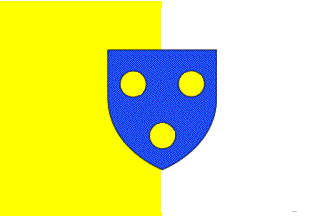
- Flag Coat of arms
- Location of Le Bourget-du-Lac
- Location within France Location within Auvergne-Rhône-Alpes
- Coordinates: 45°38′44″N 5°51′33″E
- Country: France
- Region: Auvergne-Rhône-Alpes
- Department: Savoie
- Arrondissement: Chambéry
- Canton: La Motte-Servolex
- Intercommunality: CA Grand Lac

Government
  - Mayor (2020–2026): Nicolas Mercat
- Area^{1}: 20.05 km^{2} (7.74 sq mi)
- Elevation: 241 m (791 ft)
- Highest elevation: 1,496 m (4,908 ft)
- Lowest elevation: 226 m (741 ft)
- Population (2023): 5,216
  - Density: 260.1/km^{2} (673.8/sq mi)
- Time zone: UTC+01:00 (CET)
  - Summer (DST): UTC+02:00 (CEST)
- INSEE/Postal code: 73051 /73370
- Website: www.lebourgetdulac.fr
- ^{1} French Land Register data, which excludes lakes, ponds, glaciers > 1 km^{2} (0.386 sq mi or 247 acres) and river estuaries.

Le Bourget-du-Lac (French pronunciation: [lə buʁʒɛ dy lak], literally Le Bourget of the Lake or Arpitan: Le Borgèt-du-Lèc) is a commune in the Savoie department in the Auvergne-Rhône-Alpes region in eastern/south-eastern France.

It lies near the Lac du Bourget and 12 km (7.5 mi) from Chambéry.

== Climate ==
Le Bourget-du-Lac is right on the boundary between a mid-latitude, four seasons humid subtropical climate (Cfa) and an oceanic climate (Cfb) under the Köppen system. In spite of this, it is highly influenced by its interior position within France, near several mountain ranges, resulting in quite hot summers and winters with frequent temperatures below freezing, especially at night. Convective rainfall is frequent for much of the year, rendering high precipitation/day quotas. The nearest weather station is located at Chambéry Airport, 3 km east of the town.

Climate data for Le Bourget-du-Lac (Chambéry Airport, altitude 235m, 1991–2020 normals, extremes 1973–present)
| Month | Jan | Feb | Mar | Apr | May | Jun | Jul | Aug | Sep | Oct | Nov | Dec | Year |
|---|---|---|---|---|---|---|---|---|---|---|---|---|---|
| Record high °C (°F) | 17.9 (64.2) | 20.5 (68.9) | 25.1 (77.2) | 29.5 (85.1) | 32.7 (90.9) | 36.7 (98.1) | 38.8 (101.8) | 38.8 (101.8) | 32.0 (89.6) | 29.0 (84.2) | 23.3 (73.9) | 22.7 (72.9) | 38.8 (101.8) |
| Mean daily maximum °C (°F) | 6.4 (43.5) | 8.5 (47.3) | 13.4 (56.1) | 17.3 (63.1) | 21.3 (70.3) | 25.3 (77.5) | 27.8 (82.0) | 27.1 (80.8) | 22.3 (72.1) | 17.0 (62.6) | 10.6 (51.1) | 6.9 (44.4) | 17.0 (62.6) |
| Daily mean °C (°F) | 2.9 (37.2) | 4.1 (39.4) | 8.0 (46.4) | 11.4 (52.5) | 15.6 (60.1) | 19.4 (66.9) | 21.4 (70.5) | 20.9 (69.6) | 16.8 (62.2) | 12.3 (54.1) | 6.9 (44.4) | 3.4 (38.1) | 11.9 (53.4) |
| Mean daily minimum °C (°F) | −0.7 (30.7) | −0.4 (31.3) | 2.5 (36.5) | 5.6 (42.1) | 10.0 (50.0) | 13.5 (56.3) | 15.0 (59.0) | 14.6 (58.3) | 11.3 (52.3) | 7.7 (45.9) | 3.1 (37.6) | 0.0 (32.0) | 6.8 (44.2) |
| Record low °C (°F) | −19.0 (−2.2) | −14.4 (6.1) | −10.3 (13.5) | −4.6 (23.7) | −1.4 (29.5) | 2.8 (37.0) | 5.4 (41.7) | 5.0 (41.0) | 1.0 (33.8) | −4.3 (24.3) | −10.8 (12.6) | −13.5 (7.7) | −19.0 (−2.2) |
| Average precipitation mm (inches) | 102.6 (4.04) | 79.1 (3.11) | 93.1 (3.67) | 87.9 (3.46) | 101.0 (3.98) | 94.5 (3.72) | 91.7 (3.61) | 97.6 (3.84) | 104.3 (4.11) | 113.3 (4.46) | 114.6 (4.51) | 124.2 (4.89) | 1,203.9 (47.40) |
| Average precipitation days (≥ 1.0 mm) | 9.7 | 8.1 | 9.7 | 9.6 | 11.1 | 9.9 | 8.2 | 8.5 | 8.8 | 10.3 | 10.1 | 10.6 | 114.6 |
| Average snowy days | 5.4 | 4.6 | 2.2 | 1.2 | 0.0 | 0.0 | 0.0 | 0.0 | 0.0 | 0.0 | 1.7 | 3.2 | 18.3 |
| Mean monthly sunshine hours | 76.6 | 101.8 | 157.8 | 176.2 | 202.3 | 236.3 | 261.6 | 237.1 | 180.7 | 123.8 | 74.5 | 66.3 | 1,894.9 |
Source 1: Météo-France
Source 2: Infoclimat.fr

== Population ==
Historical population
| Year | Pop. | ±% p.a. |
|---|---|---|
| 1968 | 1,849 | — |
| 1975 | 1,863 | +0.11% |
| 1982 | 2,098 | +1.71% |
| 1990 | 2,886 | +4.07% |
| 1999 | 3,945 | +3.53% |
| 2007 | 4,155 | +0.65% |
| 2012 | 4,489 | +1.56% |
| 2017 | 4,866 | +1.63% |
| 2023 | 5,216 | +1.16% |
Source: INSEE

== Gallery ==
View of Le Bourget-du-Lac
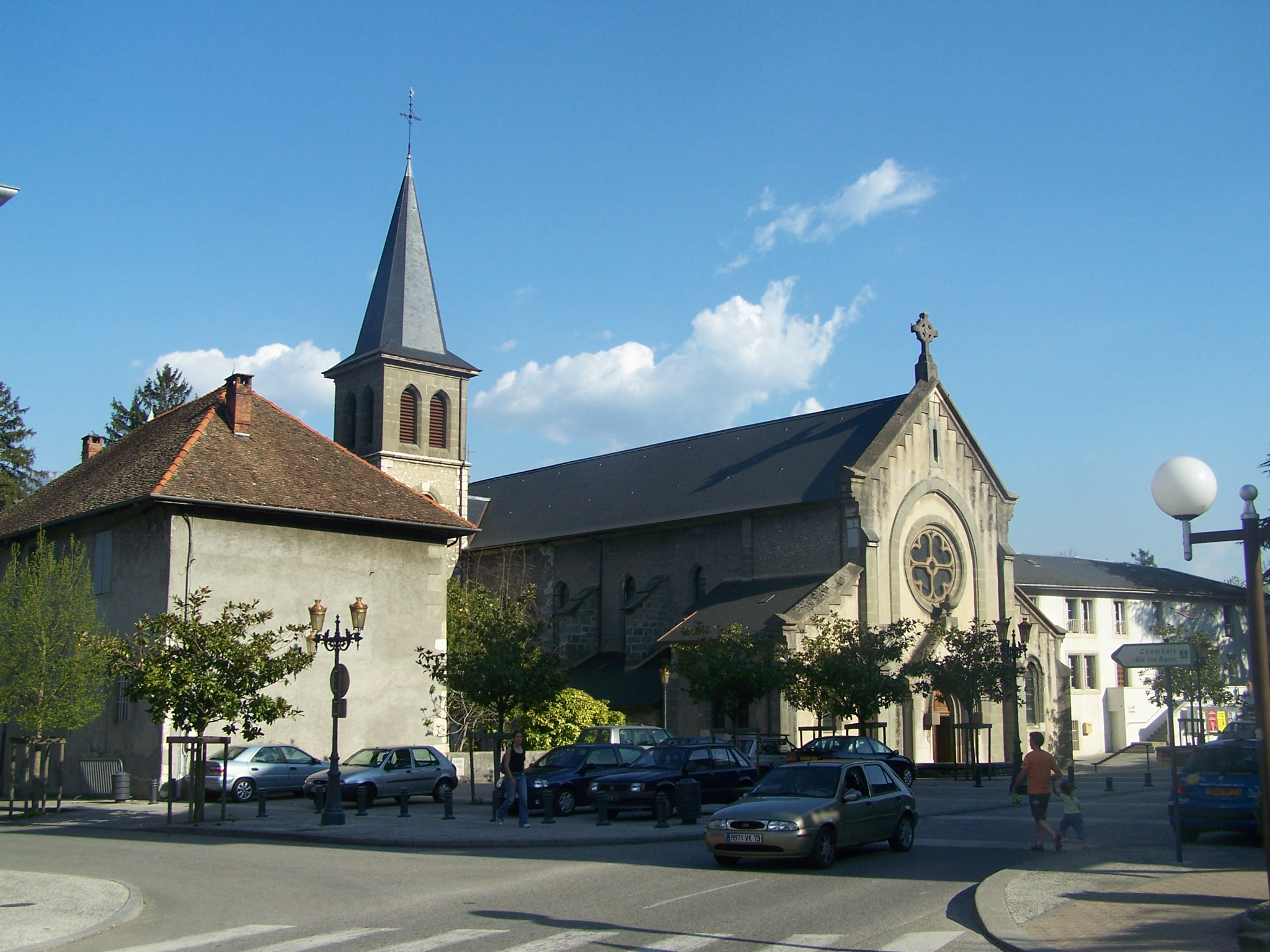
The church.

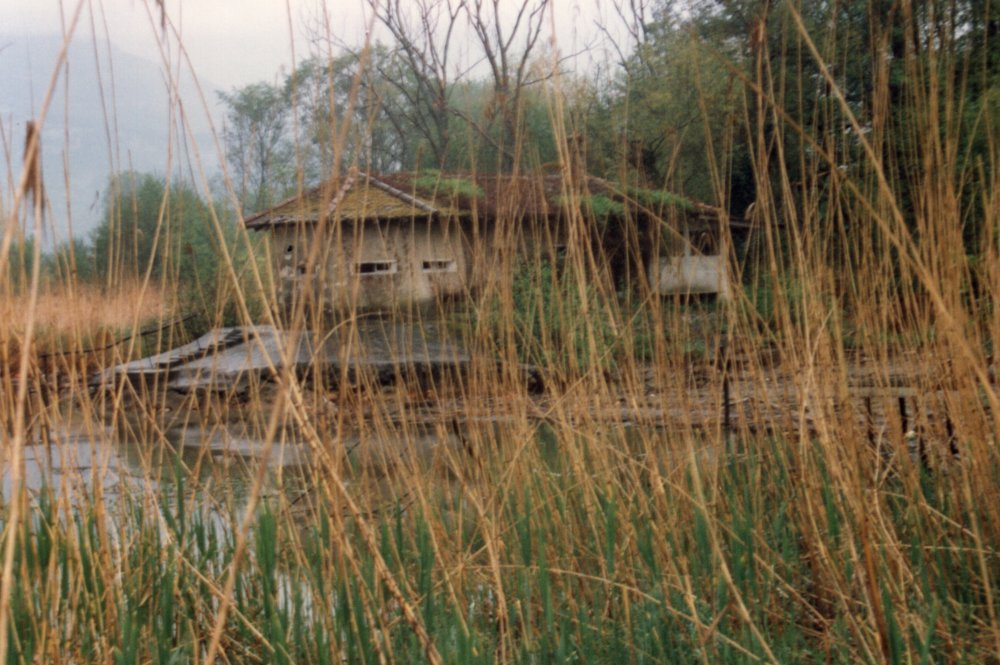
Old ironworks transformed into an observation point for birds.

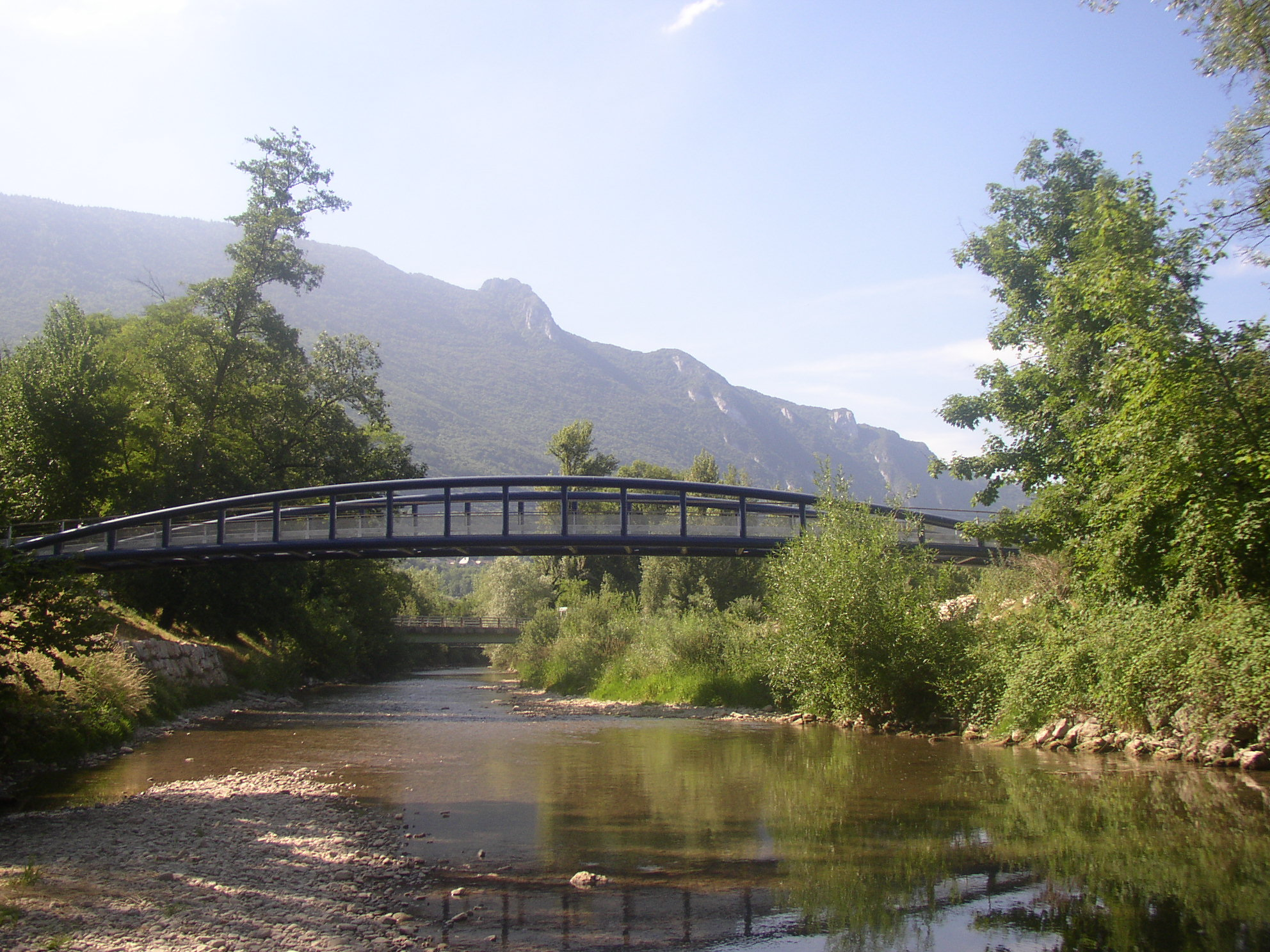
The river Leysse close to the commune.

== See also ==
- Communes of the Savoie department
