= Chambéry Airport =

Chambéry Airport Aéroport de Chambéry - Savoie-Mont-Blanc

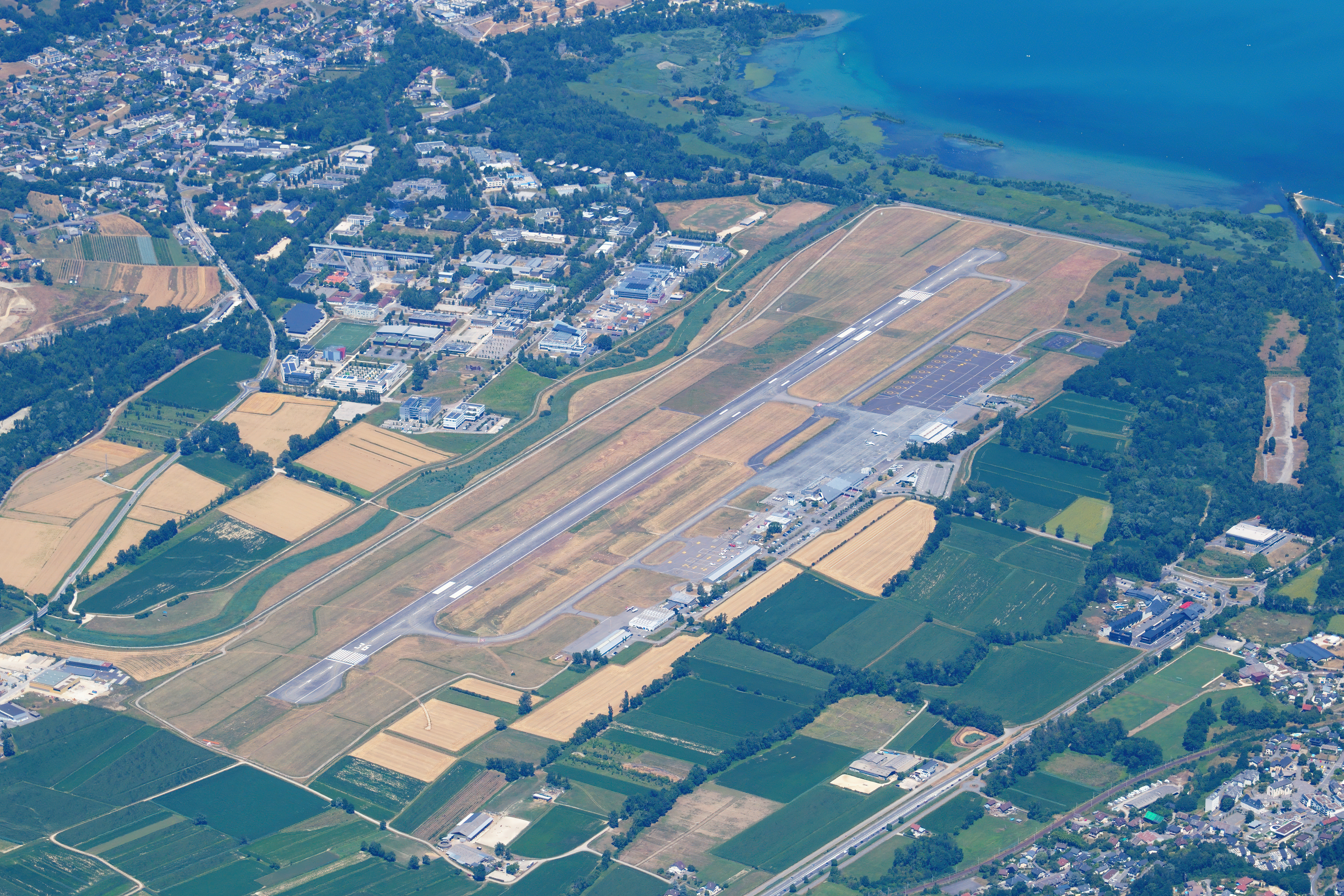
- IATA: CMF; ICAO: LFLB; WMO: 07491

Summary
- Airport type: Public
- Owner: Conseil départemental de la Savoie (100%)
- Operator: Vinci Airports
- Serves: Chambéry, France
- Location: Voglans, La Motte-Servolex, Le Bourget-du-Lac, Viviers-du-Lac
- Built: 1938
- Elevation AMSL: 234 m (768 ft)
- Coordinates: 45°38′24″N 05°52′52″E
- Website: chambery-airport.com

Map
- Location of airport in Auvergne-Rhône-Alpes region LFLB (France)

Runways
Direction	Length		Surface
Direction	m	ft	Surface
18/36	2,020	6,627	Asphalt
18/36	700	2,297	Grass

Statistics (2016)
- Passengers: 212,018
- Passenger change 15–16: ▼1.5%
- Aircraft movements: 30,282
- Movements change 15–16: ▼9.9%
- Source: French AIP

Chambéry Airport or Chambéry-Savoie Airport (French: Aéroport de Chambéry - Savoie-Mont-Blanc) (IATA: CMF, ICAO: LFLB), also known as Chambéry Aix-les-Bains Airport, is a small international airport near Chambéry, a commune in Savoy, France. Commercial activities started at the airport in 1960.

Airport logo c. 2017.

== Facilities ==
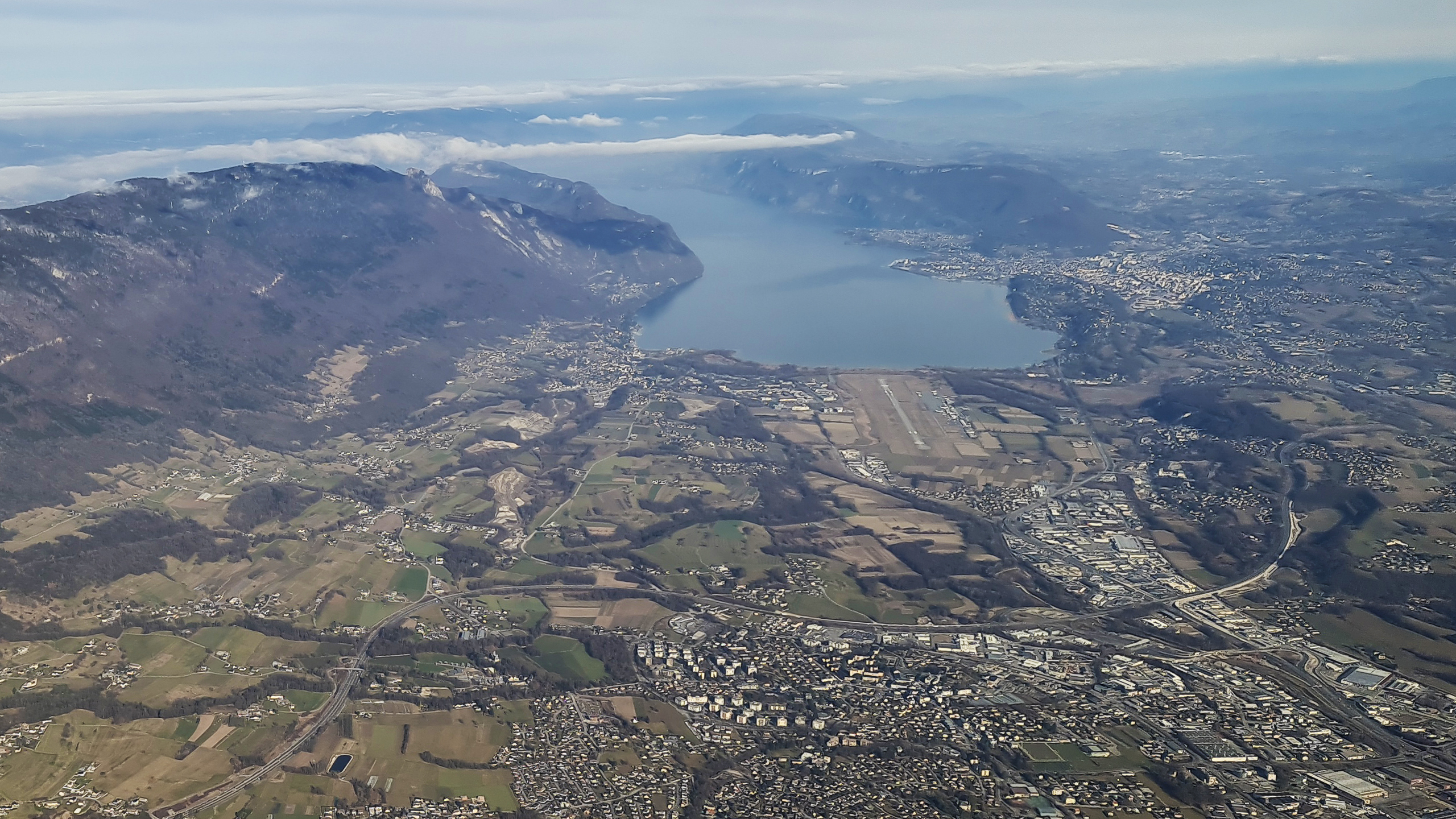
The airport, at the southern end of Lake Bourget.

The airport is at an elevation of 234 metres (768 ft) above mean sea level. It has one paved runway designated which measures 2,020 by 45 metres (6,627 ft × 148 ft). It also has a parallel unpaved runway with a grass surface measuring 700 by 60 metres (2,297 ft × 197 ft).

== Airlines and destinations ==
The following airlines operate regular scheduled and charter flights at Chambéry Airport:

Airlines	Destinations
British Airways	Seasonal: London–City, London–Gatwick, London–Stansted
Jet2.com	Seasonal: Birmingham, Bristol, Edinburgh, Leeds/Bradford, London–Gatwick (begins 21 December 2026), London–Stansted, Manchester, Newcastle upon Tyne
TUI Airways	Seasonal: Cardiff, Edinburgh, Exeter, Glasgow, London–Stansted, Manchester

== Airport statistics ==
	Number of passengers	Percentage change	Number of movements
1997	77,798	–	–
1998	80,749	▲3.8%	—
1999	109,262	▲35.3%	—
2000	114,144	▲4.5%	44,675
2001	121,958	▲6.8%	41,660
2002	141,502	▲16%	40,169
2003	137,169	▼3.1%	37,488
2004	180,813	▲31.8%	37,047
2005	194,849	▲7.8%	39,867
2006	194,827	▼0%	40,315
2007	231,843	▲19%	33,141
2008	270,632	▲16.7%	32,822
2009	258,783	▼4.4%	33,954
2010	231,820	▼10.4%	34,805
2011	233,749	▲0.8%	36,871
2012	228,291	▼2.3%	37,872
2013	218,120	▼4.5%	31,846
2014	225,913	▲3.6%	30,280
2015	215,216	▼4.7%	33,597
2016	212,018	▼1.5%	30,282
^{Source: Union des Aéroports Français (UAF)}
