= Lac du Bourget =

Lake in Savoie, France

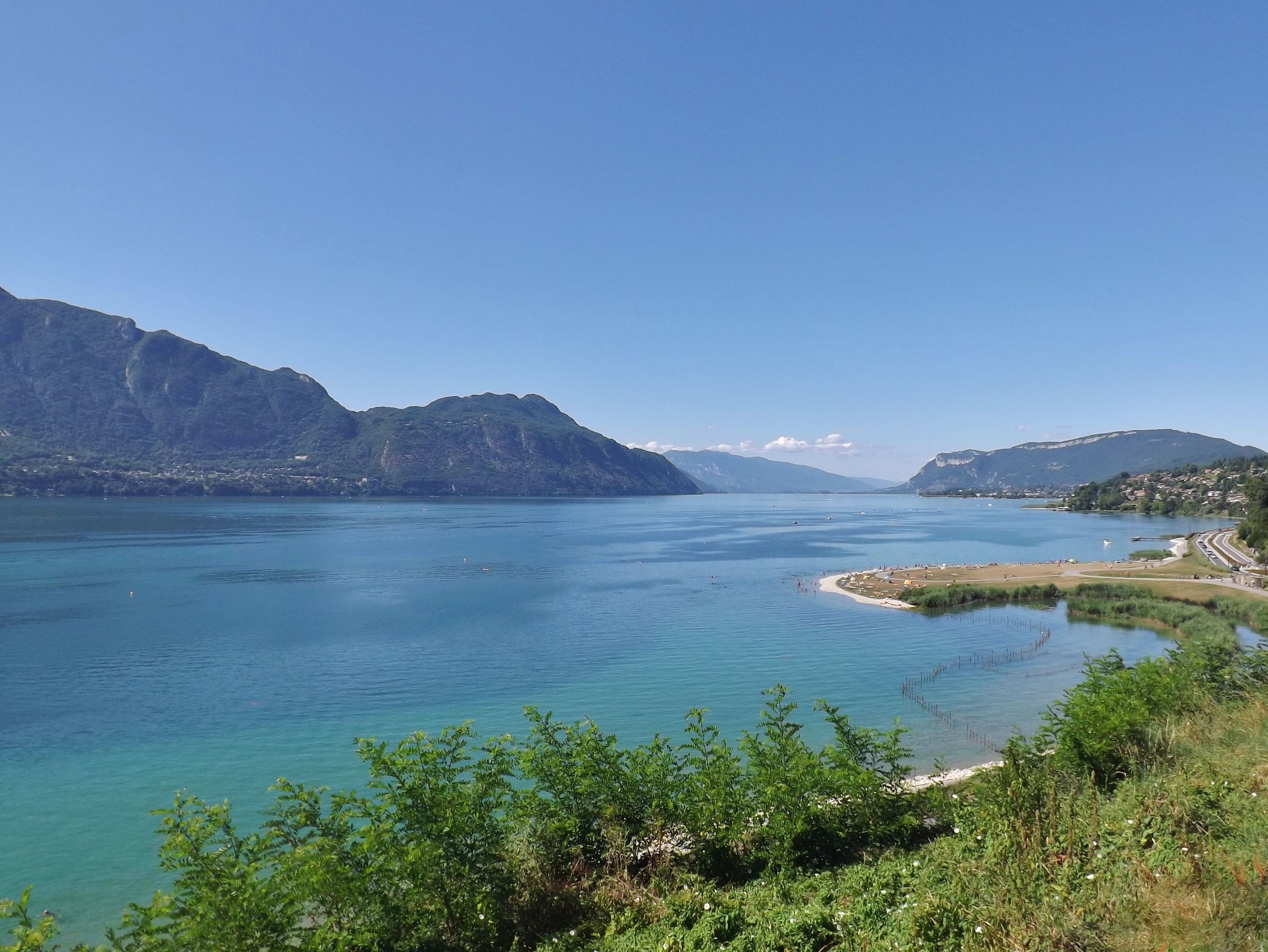
- View from the heights of Viviers-du-Lac

- Location within Savoie
- Location: Savoie, France
- Coordinates: 45°44′N 5°52′E
- Primary inflows: Leysse, Tillet, Sierroz
- Primary outflows: Canal de Savières, Rhône
- Catchment area: 560 km^{2} (220 mi^{2})
- Basin countries: France
- Max. length: 18 km (11 mi)
- Max. width: 3.5 km (2.2 mi)
- Surface area: 44.5 km^{2} (17.2 mi^{2})
- Average depth: 85 m (279 ft)
- Max. depth: 145 m (476 ft)
- Water volume: 3,600×10^{6} m^{3} (2,900,000 acre⋅ft)
- Residence time: 8 years
- Surface elevation: 231.5 m (760 ft)
- Settlements: Aix-les-Bains; Le Bourget-du-Lac; Brison-Saint-Innocent; Conjux

Ramsar Wetland
- Official name: Lac du Bourget - Marais de Chautagne
- Designated: 2 February 2003
- Reference no.: 1268

Lac du Bourget (French: [lak dy buʁʒɛ]; English Lake Bourget), also locally known as Lac d'Aix ([lak d‿ɛ]), is a lake at the southernmost end of the Jura Mountains in the department of Savoie, France. It is the deepest lake located entirely within France, and either the largest or second largest after Lac de Grand-Lieu depending on season.

The largest town on its shore is Aix-les-Bains. Chambéry, the capital of Savoie, lies about 10 km south of the lake. The lake is mainly fed by the river Leysse (and other small rivers), and it drains towards the river Rhône through the Canal de Savières, an artificial channel. It is a Ramsar site. The extinct bezoule was found only in this lake.

The lake was formed during the last period of global glaciation in the Alps (Würm glaciation) during the Pleistocene epoch. It has a surface area of 44.5 square kilometres (4,450 hectares). The long and narrow north-south axis of the lake extends 18 km in length, and ranges between 1.6 km and 3.5 km in width. The lake's average depth is 85 m, and its maximum depth in 145 m. The lake is meromictic. Unlike ordinary lakes, its deep water does not mix annually with water closer to the surface.

The lake is bordered by the steep summits of the Mont du Chat and the Chaîne de l'Épine on the west, and Bauges Mountains on the east, which form its shores.

Lac du Bourget was made famous by several romantic poems of Alphonse de Lamartine, including Le Lac, as well as by descriptions by Xavier de Maistre, Honoré de Balzac, and Alexandre Dumas.

In 2025, the lake was designated as a biosphere reserve by UNESCO.

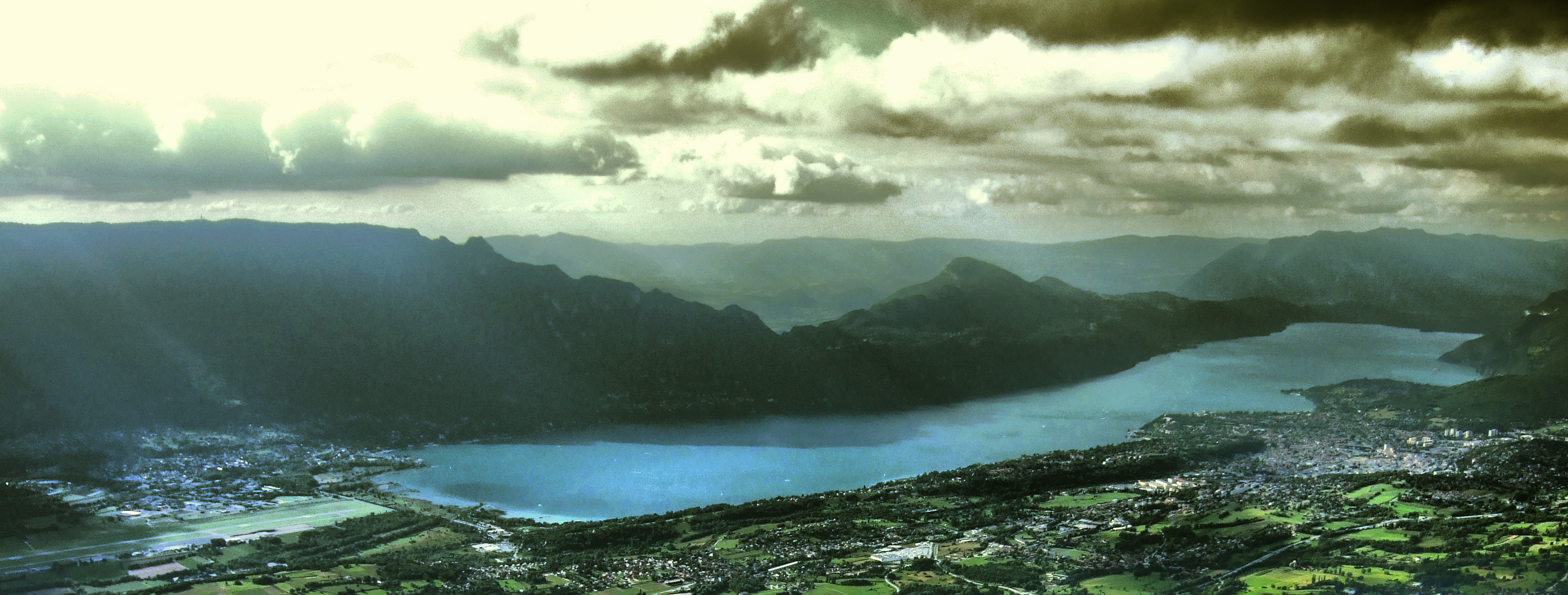
Panoramic view from Nivolet peak. Chambéry Airport is visible on the left, at the southern end of the lake, and Aix-les-Bains on the right

== Etymology ==
Named Lacus de Burgeto in 1313, its name "Le Bourget" comes from the eponymous castle, which became the main residence of the Counts of Savoy from the middle of the 13th century until the following century. Formerly, it was called "Lac de Châtillon" (Ripa laci de Castellione in the 13th century), in reference to the castle and the eponymous seigneury. It is mentioned in particular in the donation made by the Count of Savoy Amédée III in 1125, for the foundation of the abbey of Hautecombe, "on the shore of the lake of Châtillon" (supra ripam loci de Castellione).

== Climate ==
Lake Bourget features an oceanic climate (Köppen: Cfb), like most places in Western Europe.

In spite of this, it is highly influenced by its interior position within France near several mountain ranges, resulting in quite hot summers and cool to cold winters with frequent temperatures below freezing, especially at night.

The surrounding mountains such as mont du Chat or mont Revard have a warm-summer humid continental climate (Köppen: Dfb).

Convective rainfall is frequent for much of the year, rendering high precipitation/day quotas. The nearest weather station is located at Chambéry Airport, less than a mile south of the lake.

Climate data for Chambéry Airport (1981–2010 averages)
Month	Jan	Feb	Mar	Apr	May	Jun	Jul	Aug	Sep	Oct	Nov	Dec	Year
Record high °C (°F)	17.9 (64.2)	20.7 (69.3)	25.1 (77.2)	29.5 (85.1)	32.7 (90.9)	36.1 (97.0)	38.8 (101.8)	38.8 (101.8)	32.0 (89.6)	29.0 (84.2)	23.3 (73.9)	22.7 (72.9)	38.8 (101.8)
Mean daily maximum °C (°F)	5.8 (42.4)	7.9 (46.2)	12.6 (54.7)	16.3 (61.3)	20.8 (69.4)	24.6 (76.3)	27.4 (81.3)	26.6 (79.9)	22.0 (71.6)	16.7 (62.1)	10.1 (50.2)	6.4 (43.5)	16.4 (61.6)
Daily mean °C (°F)	2.2 (36.0)	3.6 (38.5)	7.4 (45.3)	10.7 (51.3)	15.2 (59.4)	18.7 (65.7)	21.0 (69.8)	20.4 (68.7)	16.5 (61.7)	12.1 (53.8)	6.3 (43.3)	3.1 (37.6)	11.4 (52.6)
Mean daily minimum °C (°F)	−1.4 (29.5)	−0.7 (30.7)	2.1 (35.8)	5.1 (41.2)	9.7 (49.5)	12.8 (55.0)	14.7 (58.5)	14.2 (57.6)	11.0 (51.8)	7.4 (45.3)	2.5 (36.5)	−0.2 (31.6)	6.4 (43.6)
Record low °C (°F)	−19.0 (−2.2)	−14.4 (6.1)	−10.3 (13.5)	−4.6 (23.7)	−1.4 (29.5)	2.8 (37.0)	5.4 (41.7)	5.0 (41.0)	1.0 (33.8)	−4.3 (24.3)	−10.8 (12.6)	−13.5 (7.7)	−19.0 (−2.2)
Average precipitation mm (inches)	102.6 (4.04)	91.5 (3.60)	100.0 (3.94)	92.2 (3.63)	104.2 (4.10)	94.8 (3.73)	86.6 (3.41)	91.7 (3.61)	111.8 (4.40)	122.6 (4.83)	105.0 (4.13)	118.0 (4.65)	1,221 (48.07)
Average precipitation days	9.8	8.2	10.4	10.3	11.5	9.7	7.9	8.9	8.6	10.8	10.0	10.5	116.6
Average snowy days	5.4	4.6	2.2	1.2	0.0	0.0	0.0	0.0	0.0	0.0	1.7	3.2	18.3
Mean monthly sunshine hours	77.7	104.4	156.7	172.8	202.5	234.0	260.1	232.5	176.3	121.4	71.2	60.6	1,870.2
Source 1: Météo France
Source 2: Infoclimat
