= Chanaz =

Chanaz Shânâ (Arpitan)
- Commune
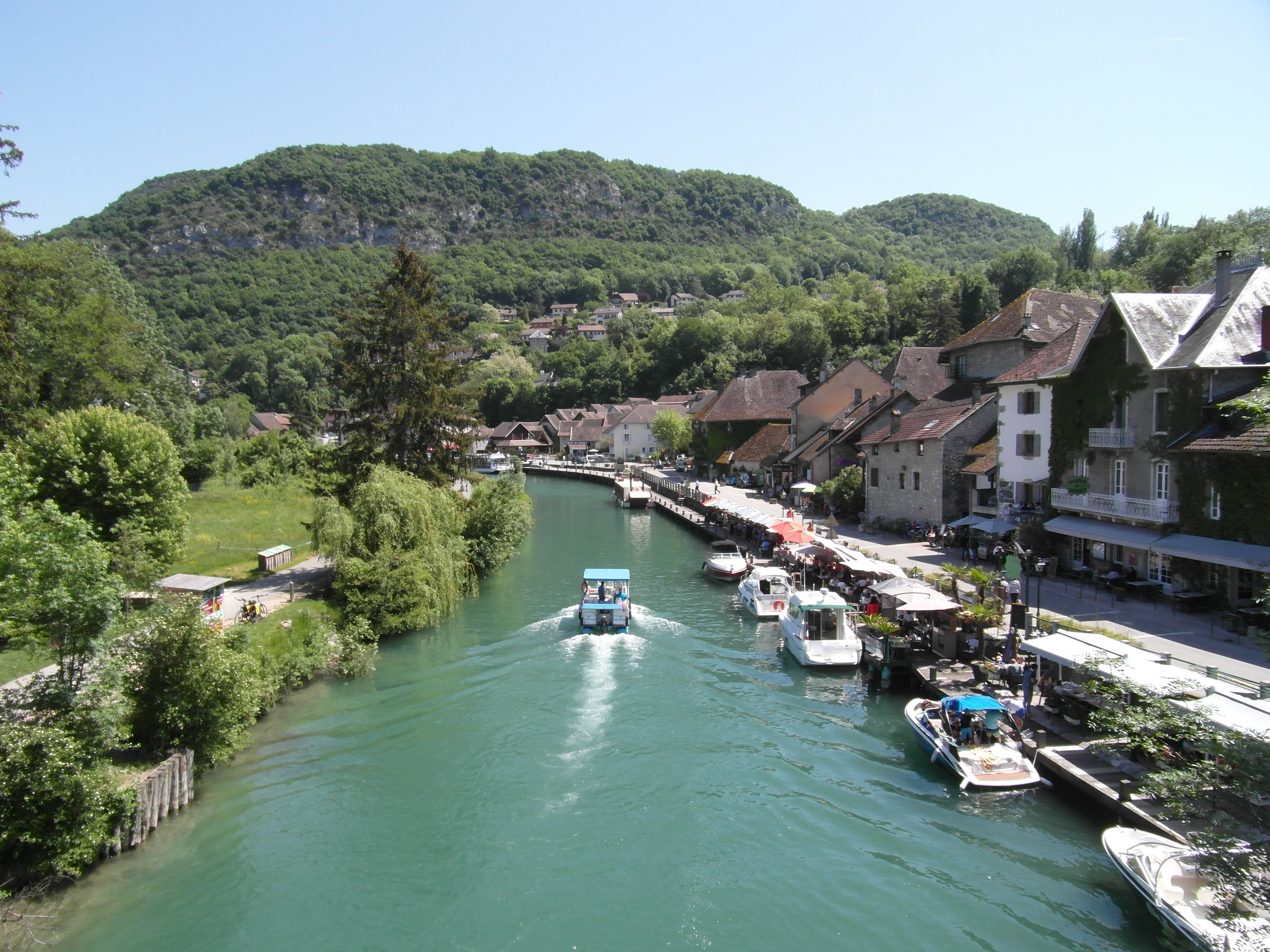
- The Canal de Savières in Chanaz
- Location of Chanaz
- Location within France Location within Auvergne-Rhône-Alpes
- Coordinates: 45°48′34″N 5°47′38″E
- Country: France
- Region: Auvergne-Rhône-Alpes
- Department: Savoie
- Arrondissement: Chambéry
- Canton: Bugey savoyard
- Intercommunality: CA Grand Lac

Government
  - Mayor (2020–2026): Yves Husson
- Area^{1}: 6.75 km^{2} (2.61 sq mi)
- Highest elevation: 572 m (1,877 ft)
- Lowest elevation: 220 m (720 ft)
- Population (2023): 551
  - Density: 81.6/km^{2} (211/sq mi)
- Time zone: UTC+01:00 (CET)
  - Summer (DST): UTC+02:00 (CEST)
- INSEE/Postal code: 73073 /73310
- Website: www.chanaz.fr
- ^{1} French Land Register data, which excludes lakes, ponds, glaciers > 1 km^{2} (0.386 sq mi or 247 acres) and river estuaries.

Chanaz (Arpitan: Shânâ) is a commune in the Savoie department in the Auvergne-Rhône-Alpes region in Southeastern France. As of 2023, the population of the commune was 551.

== Toponymy ==
As with many polysyllabic Arpitan toponyms or anthroponyms, the final -x marks oxytonic stress (on the last syllable), whereas the final -z indicates paroxytonic stress (on the penultimate syllable) and should not be pronounced, although in French it is often mispronounced due to hypercorrection.

== See also ==
- Communes of the Savoie department
- Canal de Savières
