= Savières Canal =

Canal in eastern France

Canal de Savières
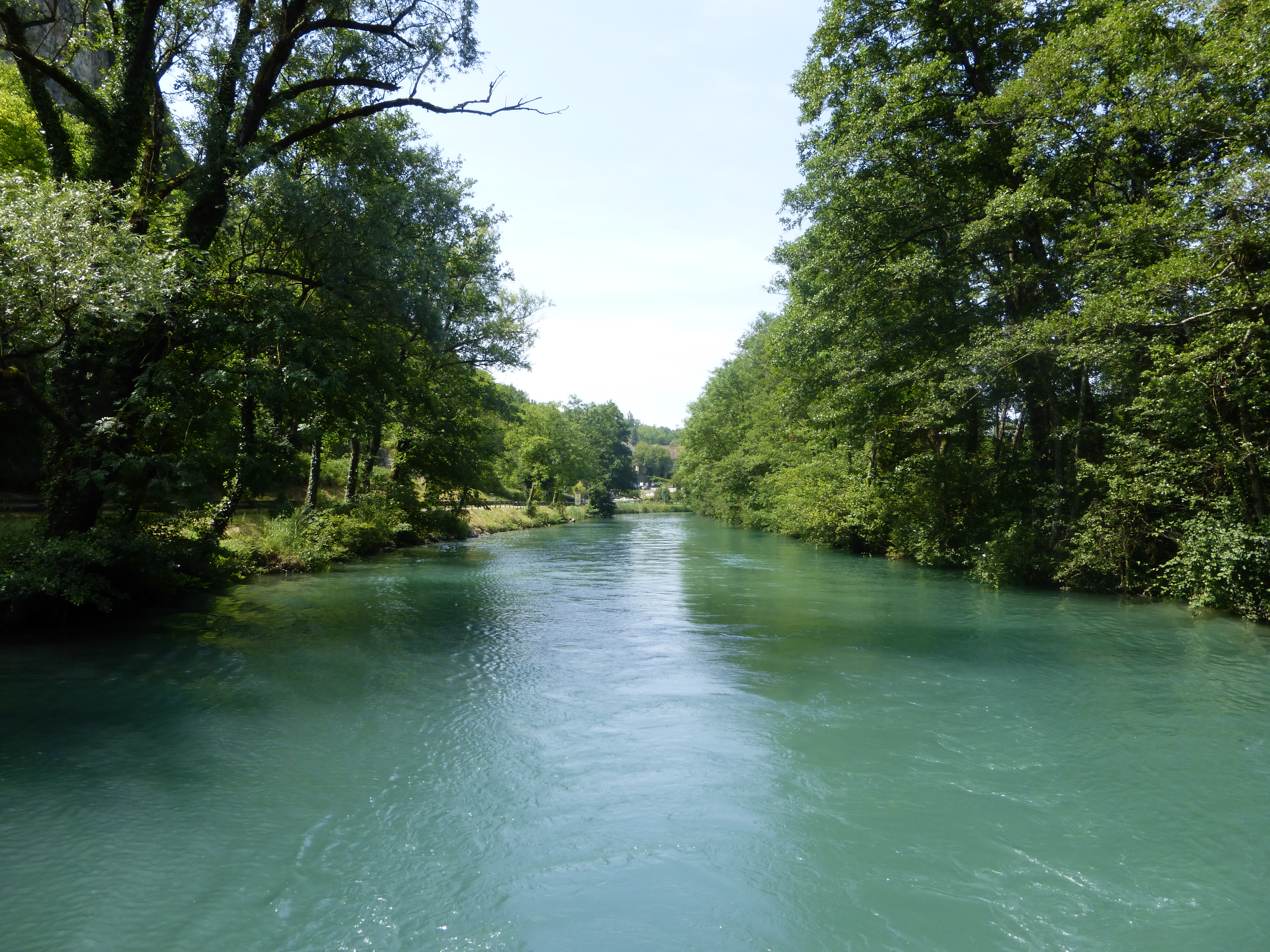

Specifications
- Length: 4.5 km (2.8 mi)
- Locks: 1

Geography
- Start point: Lac du Bourget
- End point: Rhône at Chanaz
- Beginning coordinates: 45.80501°N 5.825425°E
- Ending coordinates: 45.812511°N 5.78649°E

The Canal de Savières (French: [kanal də savjɛʁ]) is a canal in eastern France. It joins the Lac du Bourget to the Rhône at Chanaz. It is 4.5 km (2.8 mi) long with one lock. It was a natural watercourse until canalised in the 19th century.

== See also ==
- List of canals in France
