= Chaîne de l'Épine =

Mountain ridge in Savoie, France

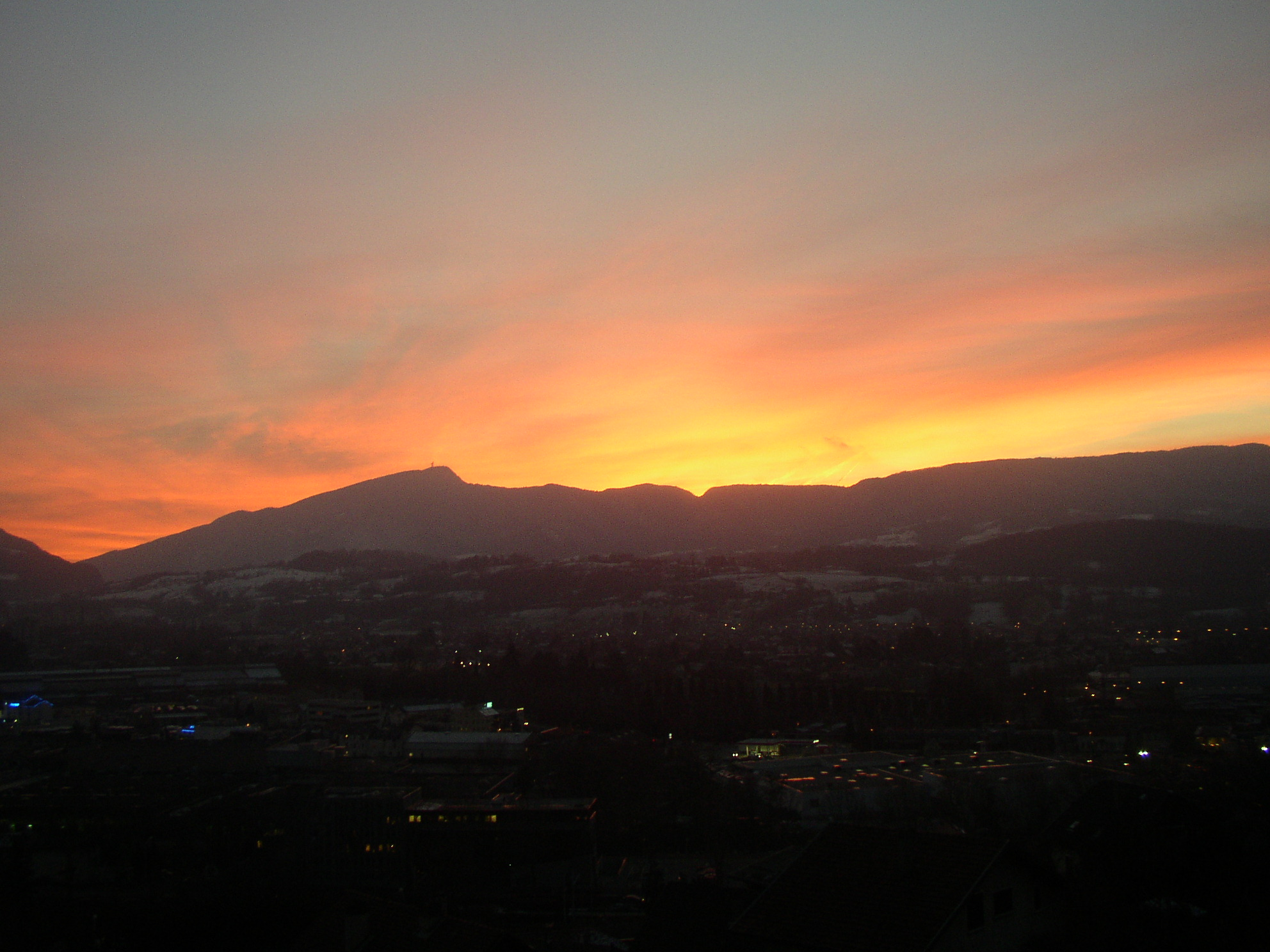
- Sunset over the Chain de l'Épine ridge seen from Chambéry in Savoie, France.

Highest point
- Peak: Mont Grelle
- Elevation: 1,425 m (4,675 ft)
- Coordinates: 45°34′52″N 5°49′23″E

Geography
- Location within France
- Location: Savoie, Rhône-Alpes, France
- Parent range: Jura Mountains

Geology
- Rock age(s): Jurassic and Cretaceous deposits Miocene formation
- Mountain type: Limestone fold mountain

The Chaîne de l'Épine, in the department of Savoie in southeast France, is a 20-kilometre (12 mi) long ridge of the Jura Mountains that runs north–south along the east side of the Lac d'Aiguebelette, from the Col de l'Épine west of Chambéry as far as the western edge of the Chartreuse Mountains, near the commune of Les Échelles. To the north, the ridge becomes the Mont du Chat ridge along the western shore of the Lac du Bourget. At the southern end, the ridge terminates at the Guiers River.

== Etymology ==
There are two explanations for the origin of the name "Chaîne de l'Épine". One traces "l'Épine" as a reference to a thorn from Christ's crown of thorns that Guillaume de Montbel brought back with him on his return from the Seventh Crusade in 1254. Montbel built the Château de l'Épine on the ridge above Nances and placed the holy thorn relic in the castle's chapel. In time, the chapel became such an important pilgrimage site that the name "l'Épine" was given to the whole mountain. The second explanation sees the Celtic god Pen as the source for both the name of the Chaîne de l'Épine ridge and the commune of Lépin-le-Lac to its west.

== Geography ==
=== Topography ===
The Chaîne de l'Épine and the Mont du Chat separate the Lac du Bourget (to the east and north) from the Lac d'Aiguebelette (to the west and south). The highest point is Mont Grelle (also spelled Mont Grêle) at an elevation of 1,425 metres (4,675 ft). Another notable peak is 1,232-metre (4,042 ft) Gratte-Cul at the northern end of Mont Grelle.

=== Geology ===
The Chaîne de l'Épine is an anticline, part of the "upper ridge" geological structure of the Jura Mountains. Situated between two Miocene molasse basins, the ridge is chiefly composed of limestones from the Jurassic and Cretaceous periods. The western escarpment, between the Col de l'Épine and the Col de Saint-Michel, is composed of limestones from the Kimmeridgian and Oxfordian formations, with scree at the base. The portion south of the Col de Saint-Michel consists mainly of scree with a Jurassic limestone ridge. The east escarpment, is composed of Valanginian marls and marbles, with scree and Cretaceous limestone at the base.

South of the Col de Saint-Michel pass, a change in the strike-slip fault deflects the ridge line to run northeast–southwest. Another slip fault crosses the ridge perpendicularly at the northern tip of the peak Gratte-Cul. The fold extends across the Guiers river at Entre-deux-Guiers to join the Mont Tournier anticline and form the Grand-Ratz plateau above Voreppe, forming the southern terminus of the Jura Mountains.

=== Passes and tunnels ===
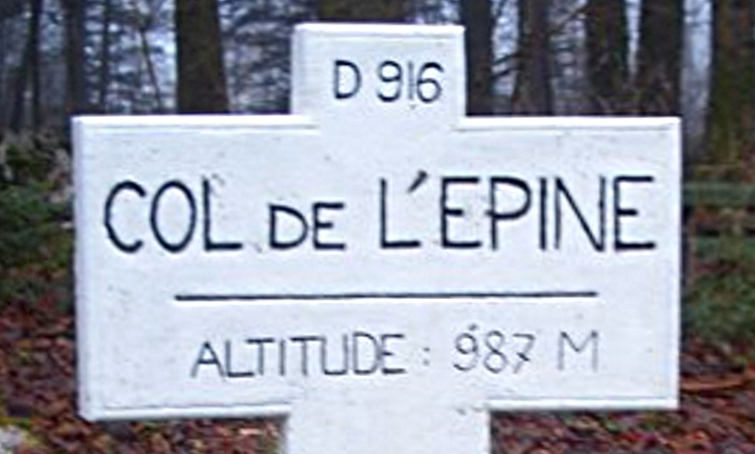
Sign at the top of the Col de l'Épine.

There are three principal passes across the ridge. A paved road (D916) runs over the 987-metre (3,238 ft) Col de l'Épine. The two other passes, the 915-metre (3,002 ft) Col du Crucifix and the 903-metre (2,963 ft) Col Saint-Michel, overlook the Lac d'Aiguebelette and are crossed by hiking trails. Some of these trails follow the routes of earlier Roman roads.

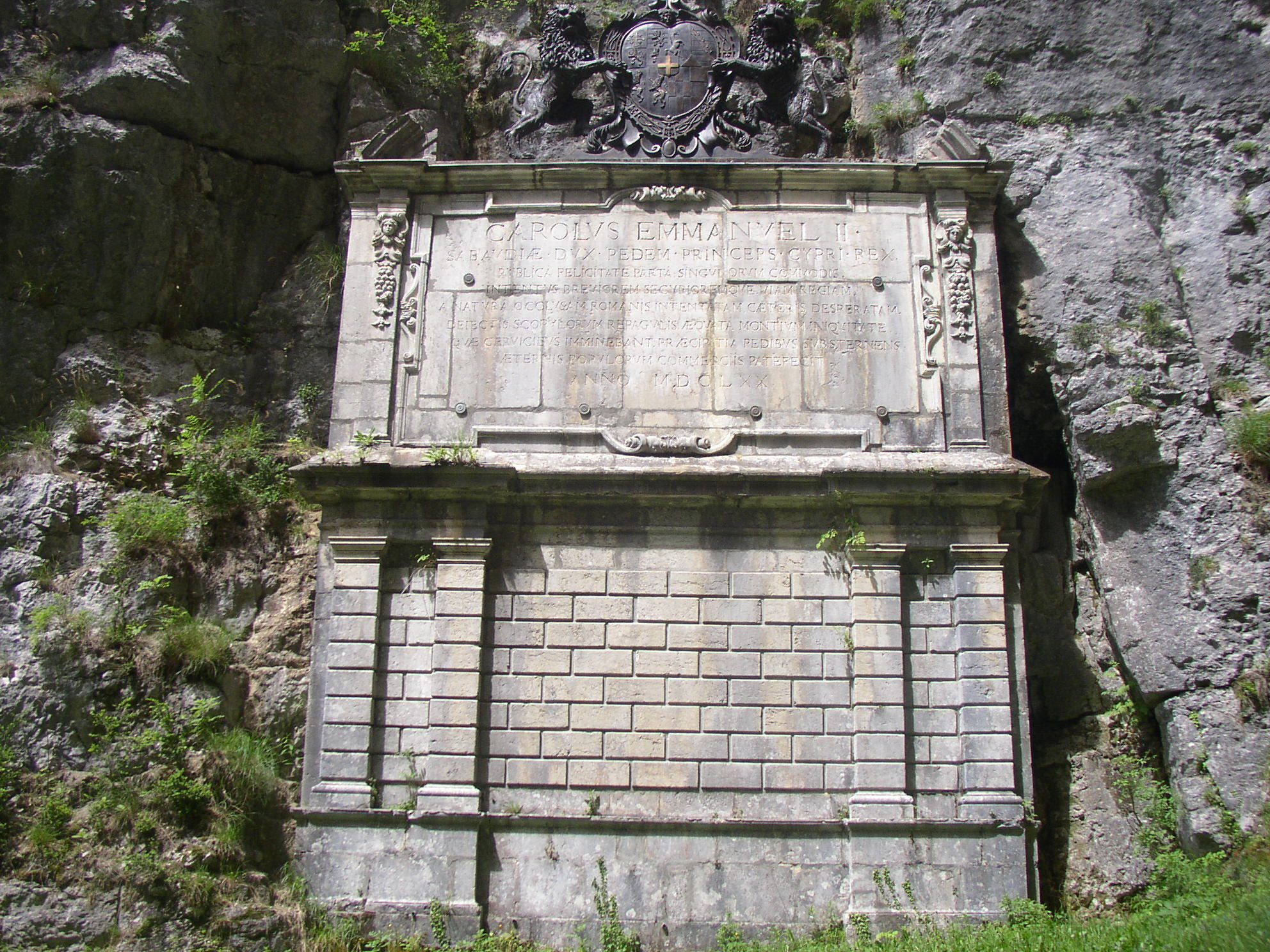
Stele near Saint-Christophe in Savoie, France, at the southern end of the Chaîne de l'Épine (45°26′57.0″N 5°47′13.3″E), commemorating the opening of Charles Emmanuel II of Savoy's royal road from Turin to Lyon in 1670.

The Voie Sarde skirts the southern end of the ridge, near Saint-Christophe, northeast of Les Échelles. The Voie Sarde or Sardinian Way was originally part of the Roman Via Agrippa road network. In 1670 the road was rebuilt by Charles Emmanuel II, Duke of Savoy with the aim of connecting his western landholdings in Savoie to Turin, capital of the Duchy of Savoy. In 1720, following the acquisition of Sardinia in the 1718 Treaty of London, the duchy officially became the Kingdom of Sardinia, leading the road to become known colloquially as the Voie Sarde.

A century later, Napoleon judged this narrow route to be an impediment to his military campaigns. After 13 years of construction (1804–17), the Tunnel de la Grotte bypassed the Voie Sarde route. The tunnel was nearly 1,000 feet (300 m) long and 25 feet (7.6 m) wide and high, sufficient for two laden wagons to pass. The English artist J. M. W. Turner sketched views of both the Voie Sarde and the new tunnel in 1819. The modern-day Route nationale 6 uses this tunnel to cross the southern end of the Chaîne de l'Épine ridge.

There are tunnels through the main bulk of the ridge in two places, both named Tunnel de l'Épine. The A43 autoroute runs through a pair of parallel tunnels under the Col de l'Épine. The northern tunnel is 3,182 metres (1.98 miles) long and was completed in 1974; the southern tunnel is 3,157 metres (1.96 miles) long and was completed in 1991. This is the 14th-longest road tunnel crossing in France. About 5 kilometres (3.1 miles) to the south is a single-track tunnel completed in 1884 for the Saint-André-le-Gaz–Chambéry railway line. This 3,076-metre (1.91-mile) tunnel begins east of the station of Aiguebelette-le-Lac and runs under the ridge, south of the Col Saint-Michel, to emerge just west of the now-closed Saint-Cassin-la-Cascade station, in the valley of the Hyères river, a left tributary of the Rhône.

== Tour de France ==
The Col de l'Épine is a popular route for cyclists. The pass formed part of the route for the Tour de France in 1947, 1965 and 1968 when it was classed at a Category 2 climb. The winners of these three climbs were:

- 1947: Apo Lazaridès (FRA)
- 1965: Gianni Motta (ITA)
- 1968: Aurelio González Puente (ESP)

Although the 2013 Tour de France included a section over the Col de l'Épine as part of Stage 19, this was a different pass of the same name, northeast of Faverges.

== Panorama ==
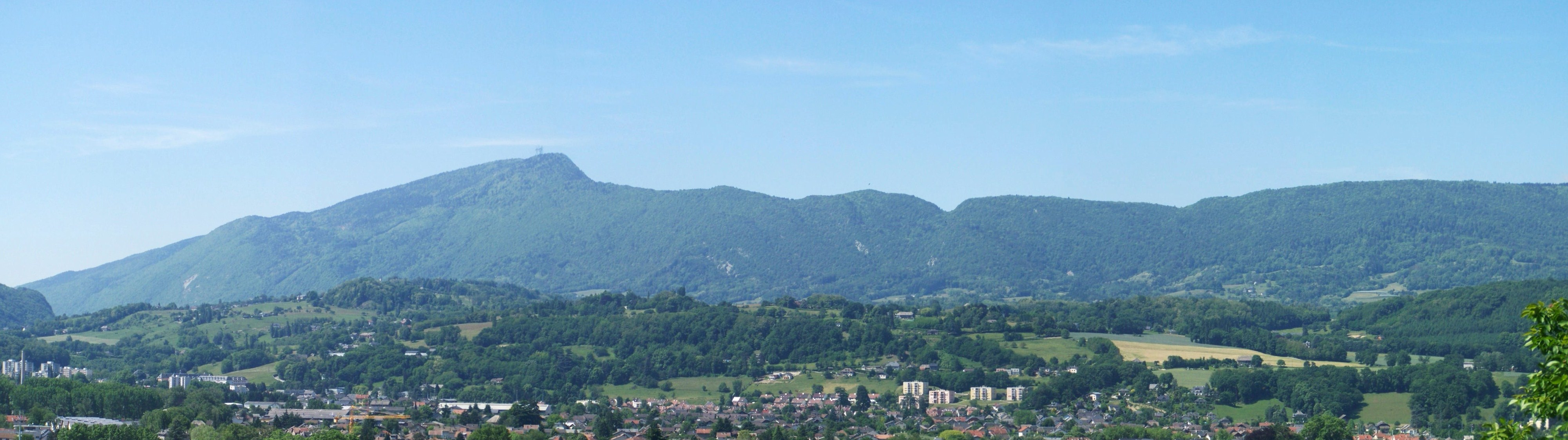
Panorama of the ridge from Chambéry, with Cognin at the base and the Col St-Michel at the lowest point on the ridge line.
