= Aiguebelette =

Aiguebelette may refer to:

- Aiguebelette-le-Lac, commune in France
- Lac d'Aiguebelette, lake in France
