= L'Épine Tunnel =

French road tunnel

The Épine Tunnel
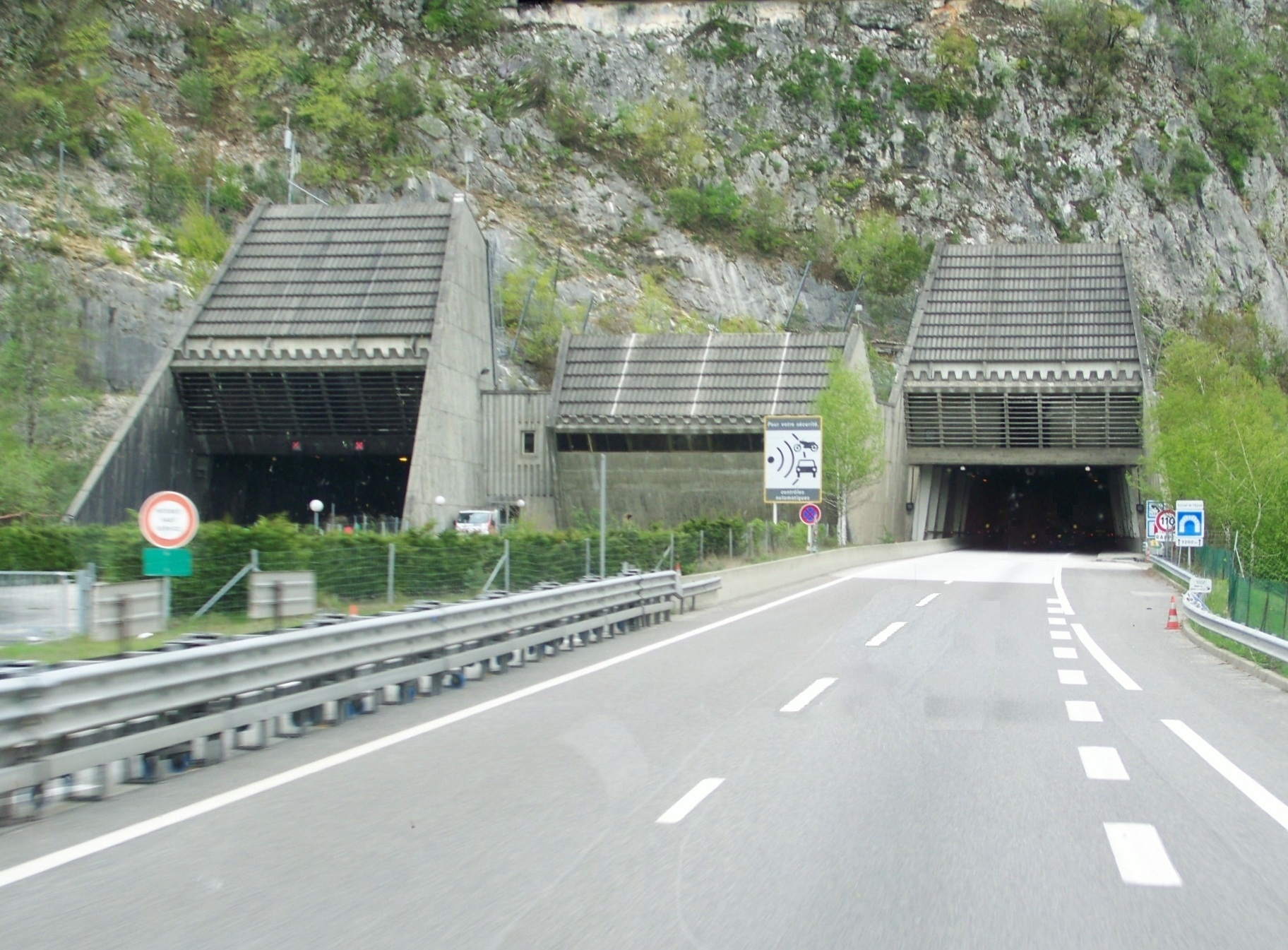
- Eastbound tunnel entry, towards Chambéry
- Interactive map of The Épine Tunnel

Overview
- Official name: Tunnel de L'Épine
- Location: Savoie, Auvergne-Rhône-Alpes, France
- Coordinates: 45.57828°N 5.824614°E
- Route: A43 autoroute
- Crosses: Chaîne de l'Épine

Operation
- Constructed: Began in 1972, finished 1991
- Opened: 1974 (westbound tunnel); 1991 (eastbound tunnel)
- Operator: AREA (société d'autoroutes)
- Toll: Yes

Technical
- Length: 3,182 m (10,440 ft)
- No. of lanes: 2
- Operating speed: 110km/h

The Épine Tunnel is a motorway tunnel situated in France, in the Savoie department, in the Auvergne-Rhône-Alpes region.

The tunnel is 3,200 metres long and crosses the Chaîne de l'Épine on the A43 autoroute between Lyon and Chambéry.

== Location ==
The Épine tunnel crosses the Chaîne de l'Épine mountain in Savoie. Lyon is 125 kilometres eastbound, Chambéry is 15 kilometres westbound. The tunnel is 53 kilometres from Annecy and 71 kilometres from Grenoble. The western entrance is located less than 500 metres from the northern tip of Lac d'Aiguebelette. The eastern entrance is by the town of La Motte-Servolex.

== History ==
Construction began in 1972. The westbound tunnel was completed in 1974, and opened to two-way traffic at the end of 1974, the same time as the autoroute between Bourgoin-Jallieu and Chambéry.

Work had begun on the eastbound tunnel, however was delayed due to roughly 2000m² of sand and mud needing to be cleared out from the cavity. This cavity was then filled with a concrete dam to prevent any further effusion. Work on the tunnel resumed in August 1989, to allow the tunnel to be completed prior to the Albertville Olympics in 1992. There is a skylight at the top of the concrete dam to view the cavity. The eastbound tunnel was commissioned and opened to traffic in 1991. After the tunnel opened, visitors were not permitted to the cavity due to an increase in exhaust emissions.

Between 3 and 20 August 2009, AREA (the tunnels operator) carried out renovation work on the westbound tunnel. AREA claimed this was to improve drainage of the Épine massif to the right of the tunnel. Heavy rain had caused the tunnel to rise and the work consisted of building a chamber to facilitate the flow of water without affecting the tunnel.

== Characteristics ==
The tunnel is approximately 3,200 metres long and is made up of two directional tunnels, eastbound and westbound. The eastbound tunnel is slightly shorter in length since the entrances are closer to the cliff. The tunnels are straight however have a slight curve at each end, which makes it difficult to see the exit on approach. The tunnel is equipped with speed cameras.
