= Lac d'Aiguebelette =

Lake in Savoie, France

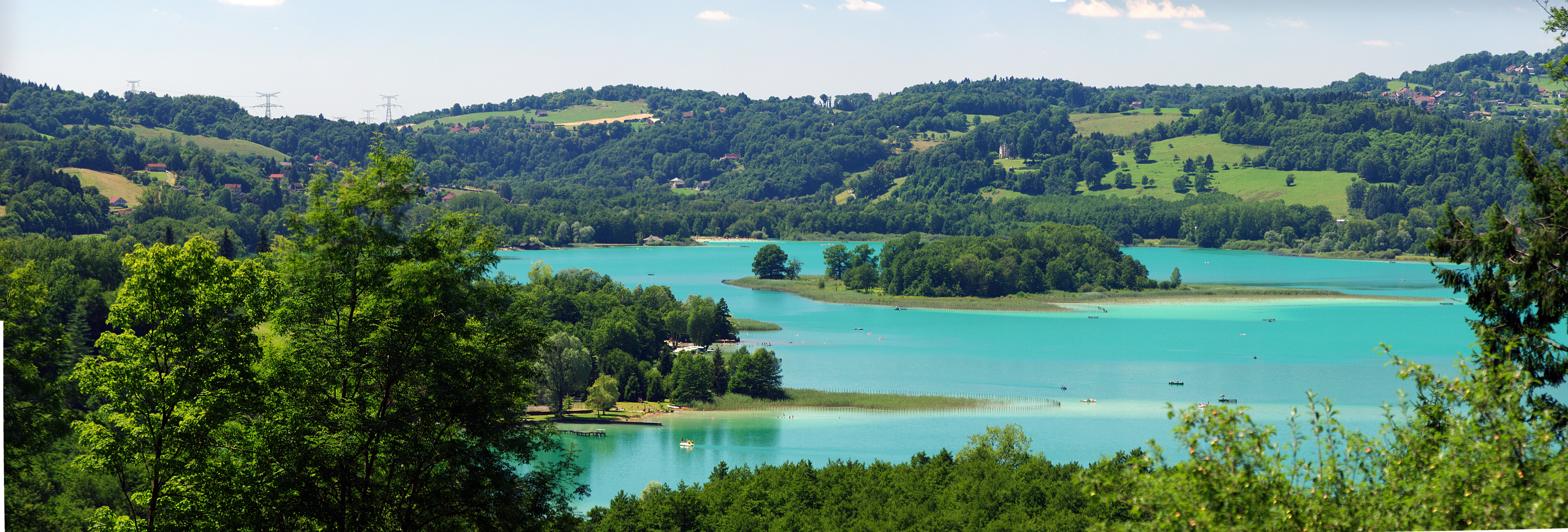
- A view of the Lac d'Aiguebelette

- Location within Savoie

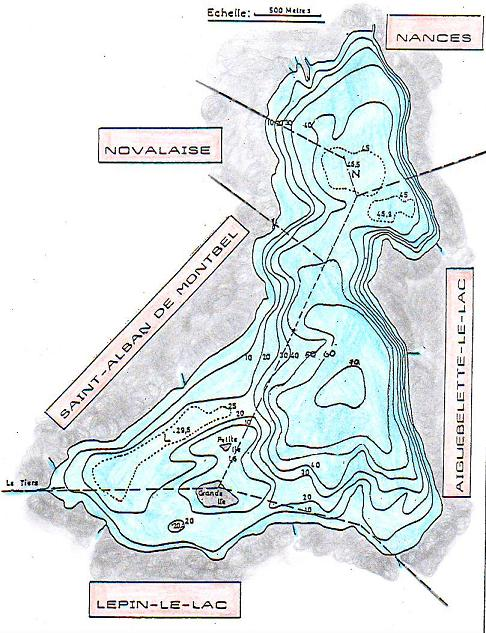
- Location: Savoie
- Coordinates: 45°33′10″N 5°47′50″E
- Primary inflows: Leysse de Novalaise
- Primary outflows: Tiers
- Catchment area: 70 km^{2} (27 sq mi)
- Basin countries: France
- Surface area: 5.45 km^{2} (2.10 sq mi)
- Max. depth: 71 m (233 ft)
- Water volume: 166×10^{6} m^{3} (135,000 acre⋅ft)
- Surface elevation: 390.5 m (1,281 ft)
- Frozen: 1909, 1929, 1941, 1942, 1956
- Islands: 2
- Settlements: Aiguebelette-le-Lac, Lépin-le-Lac, Saint-Alban-de-Montbel, Novalaise, Nances

The Lac d'Aiguebelette (French pronunciation: [lak dɛɡbəlɛt]; Lake of Aiguebelette) is a natural lake north of the Chartreuse Mountains in the French Alps and just west of the Chaîne de l'Épine in the Jura Mountains. It is located within five communes in the Savoie department: Aiguebelette-le-Lac, Lépin-le-Lac, Saint-Alban-de-Montbel, Novalaise and Nances.

The lake hosted the 1997 and 2015 World Rowing Championships.

== Geography ==
=== Situation ===
With a surface area of 5.45 km^{2} (2.10 sq mi) it is one of the largest natural lakes of France. It is the fourth-largest natural lake in the Auvergne-Rhône-Alpes region, after Lake Geneva (although partly in Switzerland), Lake Annecy and the Lac du Bourget. It has a maximum depth of 71 metres (233 ft). It is part of the Avant-Pays savoyard, formerly known as the Petit-Bugey.

It is noted for its blue-green colour and seven hot water springs. The communities of Aiguebelette-le-Lac, Lépin-le-Lac, Saint-Alban-de-Montbel, Novalaise and Nances border the lake, while the Chaîne de l'Épine ridge lies to the east with its high point at Mont Grêle (1,425 metres or 4,675 ft), south-southeast of the lake.

At the southern end there are two islands, La Petite Île and La Grande Île, the latter of which has a chapel, the Chapelle Saint-Vincent, administratively part of the commune of Lépin-le-Lac.

=== Transport ===
The lake is served by the railway line from Saint-André-le-Gaz to Chambéry; the section between Lépin-le-Lac-La Bauche station (southwest) and Aiguebelette-le-Lac station (southeast) offers panoramic views on the lake.

The A43 autoroute is north of the lake.

== Climate ==
Lake Aiguebelette has an oceanic climate (Köppen climate classification Cfb) closely bordering on a humid subtropical climate (Cfa). The average annual temperature in Lake Aiguebelette is 11.8 °C (53.2 °F). The average annual rainfall is 1,306.8 mm (51.45 in) with May as the wettest month. The temperatures are highest on average in July, at around 21.2 °C (70.2 °F), and lowest in January, at around 2.7 °C (36.9 °F). The highest temperature ever recorded in Lake Aiguebelette was 36.9 °C (98.4 °F) on 24 July 2019; the coldest temperature ever recorded was −14.3 °C (6.3 °F) on 20 December 2009.

Climate data for Lac d'Aiguebelette (1991−2020 normals, extremes 2004−2021)
Month	Jan	Feb	Mar	Apr	May	Jun	Jul	Aug	Sep	Oct	Nov	Dec	Year
Record high °C (°F)	18.1 (64.6)	20.2 (68.4)	24.3 (75.7)	28.5 (83.3)	32.3 (90.1)	35.9 (96.6)	36.9 (98.4)	36.2 (97.2)	31.8 (89.2)	27.0 (80.6)	24.1 (75.4)	19.6 (67.3)	36.9 (98.4)
Mean daily maximum °C (°F)	5.9 (42.6)	7.6 (45.7)	12.3 (54.1)	17.3 (63.1)	20.4 (68.7)	24.9 (76.8)	27.4 (81.3)	26.3 (79.3)	22.3 (72.1)	17.2 (63.0)	10.8 (51.4)	6.4 (43.5)	16.6 (61.9)
Daily mean °C (°F)	2.7 (36.9)	3.5 (38.3)	7.3 (45.1)	11.6 (52.9)	15.0 (59.0)	19.1 (66.4)	21.2 (70.2)	20.4 (68.7)	17.0 (62.6)	12.8 (55.0)	7.2 (45.0)	3.3 (37.9)	11.8 (53.2)
Mean daily minimum °C (°F)	−0.5 (31.1)	−0.6 (30.9)	2.2 (36.0)	5.8 (42.4)	9.5 (49.1)	13.3 (55.9)	15.0 (59.0)	14.5 (58.1)	11.7 (53.1)	8.4 (47.1)	3.6 (38.5)	0.1 (32.2)	6.9 (44.4)
Record low °C (°F)	−9.3 (15.3)	−13.6 (7.5)	−13.0 (8.6)	−2.9 (26.8)	0.4 (32.7)	3.0 (37.4)	8.2 (46.8)	7.8 (46.0)	4.4 (39.9)	−1.6 (29.1)	−8.4 (16.9)	−14.3 (6.3)	−14.3 (6.3)
Average precipitation mm (inches)	107.6 (4.24)	88.5 (3.48)	110.2 (4.34)	94.6 (3.72)	141.6 (5.57)	110.2 (4.34)	105.2 (4.14)	112.1 (4.41)	89.3 (3.52)	109.1 (4.30)	111.4 (4.39)	127.0 (5.00)	1,306.8 (51.45)
Average precipitation days (≥ 1.0 mm)	11.3	9.3	12.1	9.4	12.5	9.8	8.3	9.3	7.6	9.7	10.3	12.6	122.1
Source: Météo-France

== Recreation ==
The Chaîne de l'Épine ridge is crossed by hiking trails; paragliders launch from there during the summer.

Motorboats are not allowed on the lake to preserve the silence and wildlife along the lake. There are noted views of the lake from the church at Saint-Alban-de-Montbel and the mountain ridges.
