= Lépin-le-Lac =

Lépin-le-Lac Lépen-le-Léc (Arpitan)
- Commune
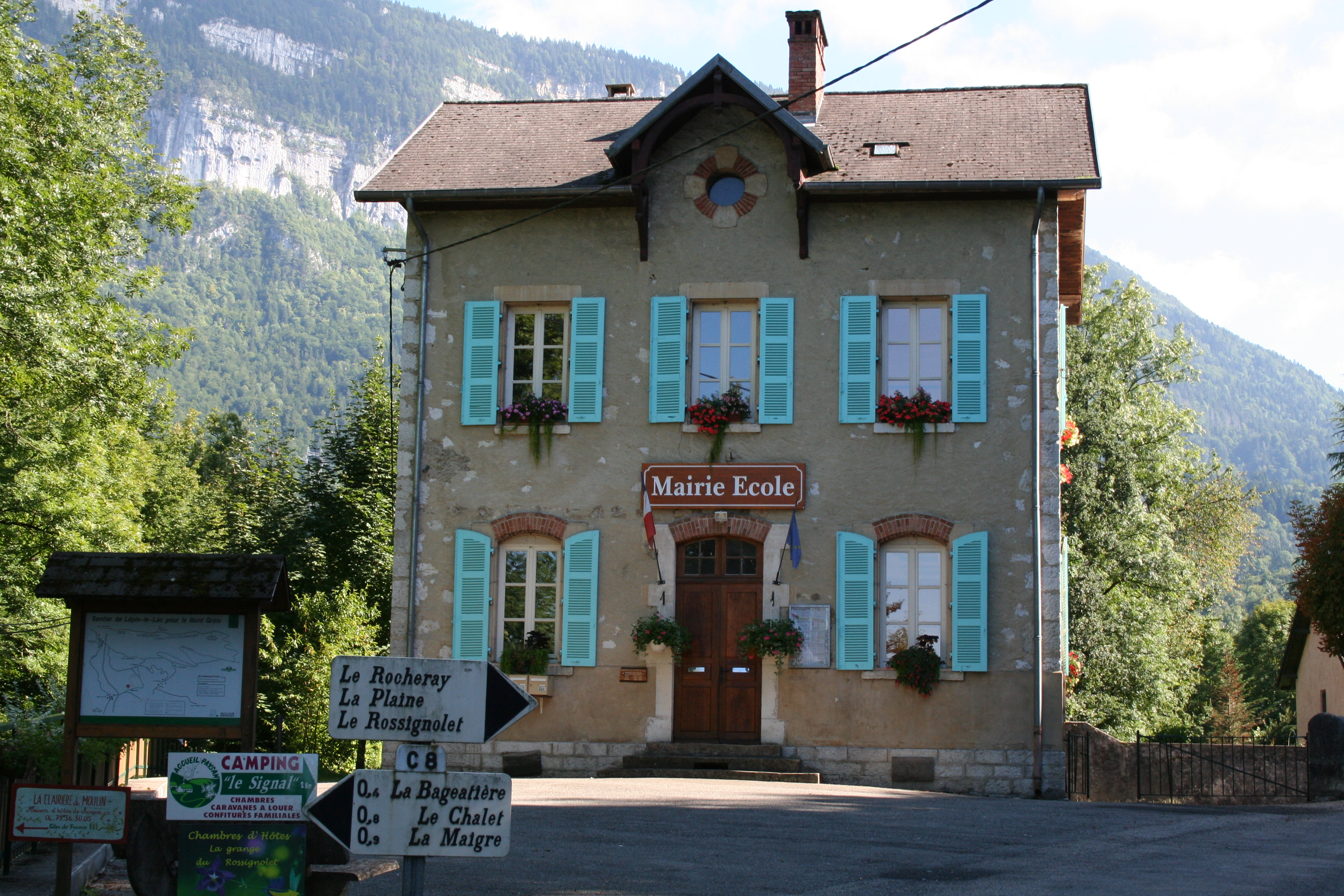
- The town hall and school in Lépin-le-Lac
- Location of Lépin-le-Lac
- Location within France Location within Auvergne-Rhône-Alpes
- Coordinates: 45°32′10″N 5°47′43″E
- Country: France
- Region: Auvergne-Rhône-Alpes
- Department: Savoie
- Arrondissement: Chambéry
- Canton: Le Pont-de-Beauvoisin
- Intercommunality: CC du Lac d'Aiguebelette

Government
  - Mayor (2020–2026): Serge Grollier
- Area^{1}: 5.11 km^{2} (1.97 sq mi)
- Highest elevation: 1,363 m (4,472 ft)
- Lowest elevation: 373 m (1,224 ft)
- Population (2023): 466
  - Density: 91.2/km^{2} (236/sq mi)
- Demonym: Lépinois
- Time zone: UTC+01:00 (CET)
  - Summer (DST): UTC+02:00 (CEST)
- INSEE/Postal code: 73145 /73610
- ^{1} French Land Register data, which excludes lakes, ponds, glaciers > 1 km^{2} (0.386 sq mi or 247 acres) and river estuaries.

Lépin-le-Lac (French pronunciation: [lepɛ̃ lə lak]; lit. 'Lépin-the-Lake'; Arpitan: Lépen-le-Léc), also simply known as Lépin, is a rural commune in the Savoie department in the Auvergne-Rhône-Alpes region in Southeastern France. As of 2023, the population of the commune was 466. It lies on the south-southwestern shore of the Lac d'Aiguebelette, one of the largest natural lakes in the area.

== Geography ==
It is located just southwest of Aiguebelette-le-Lac, which covers part of the Chaîne de l'Épine. On the other side of the ridge is Chambéry, 11.3 km (7 mi) east of Lépin-le-Lac.

== Transport ==
Lépin-le-Lac is served by Lépin-le-Lac-La Bauche station on the railway line from Saint-André-le-Gaz to Chambéry.

== Gallery ==
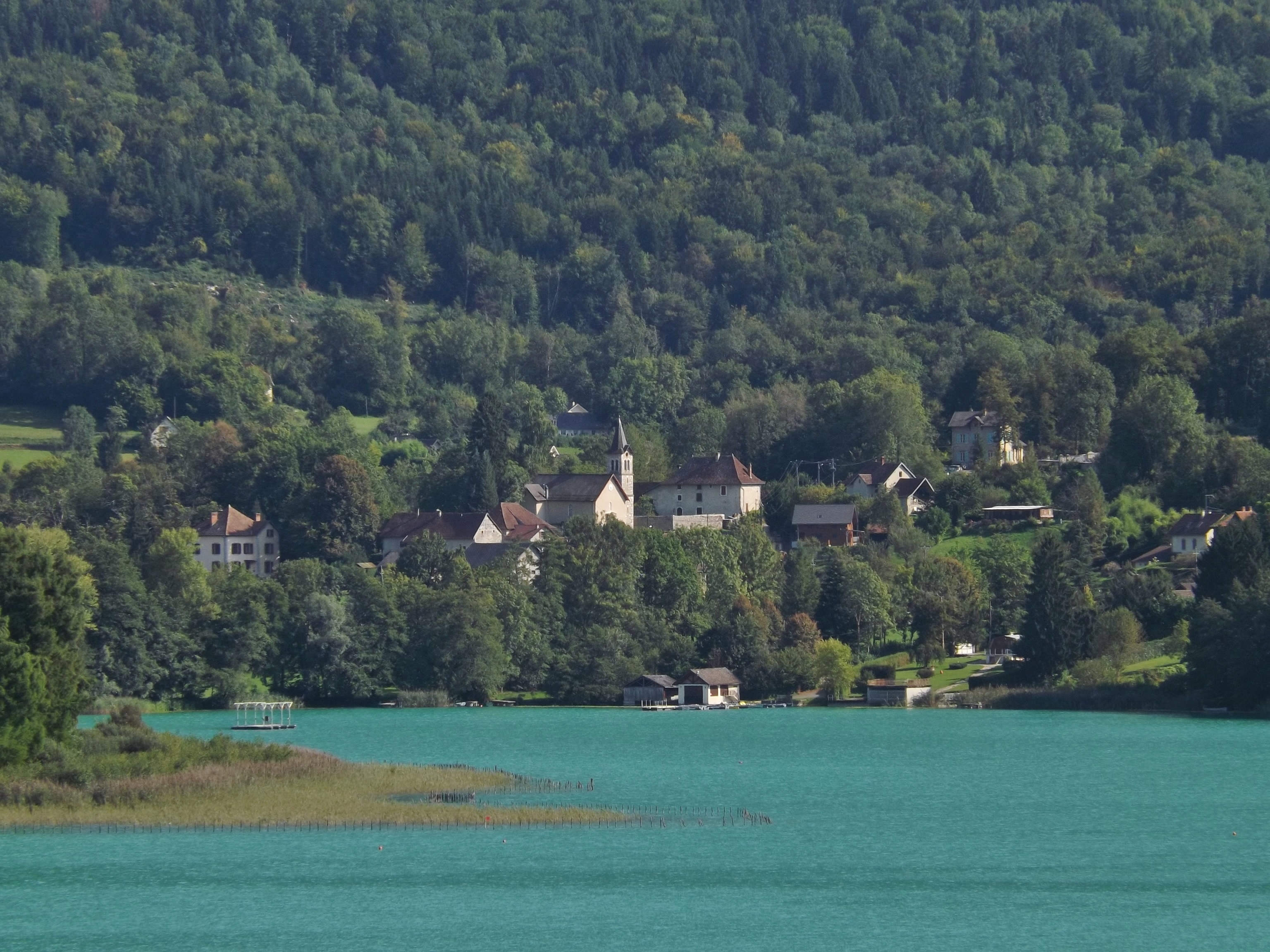
The village and the lake

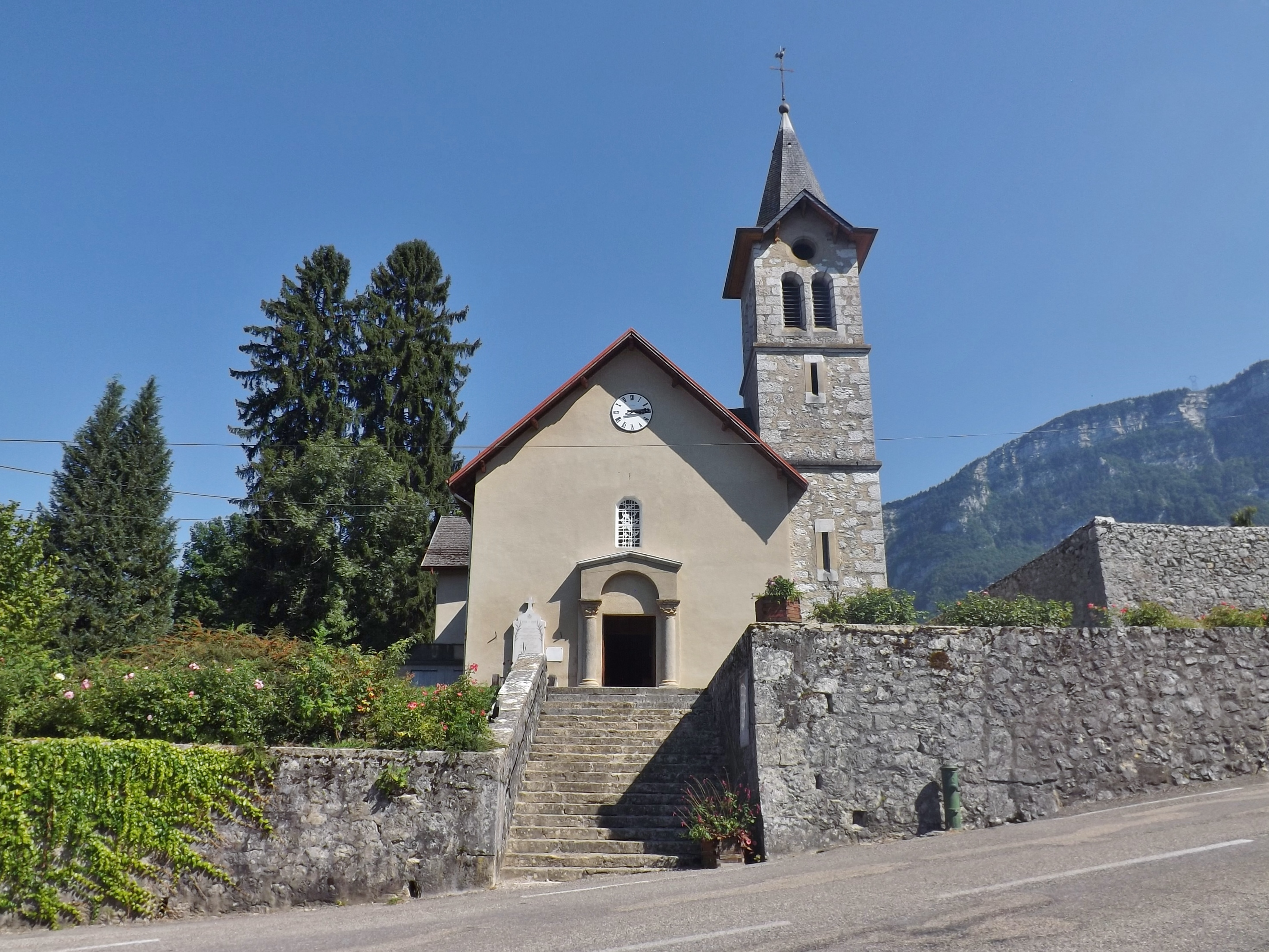
Église de la Sainte-Trinité

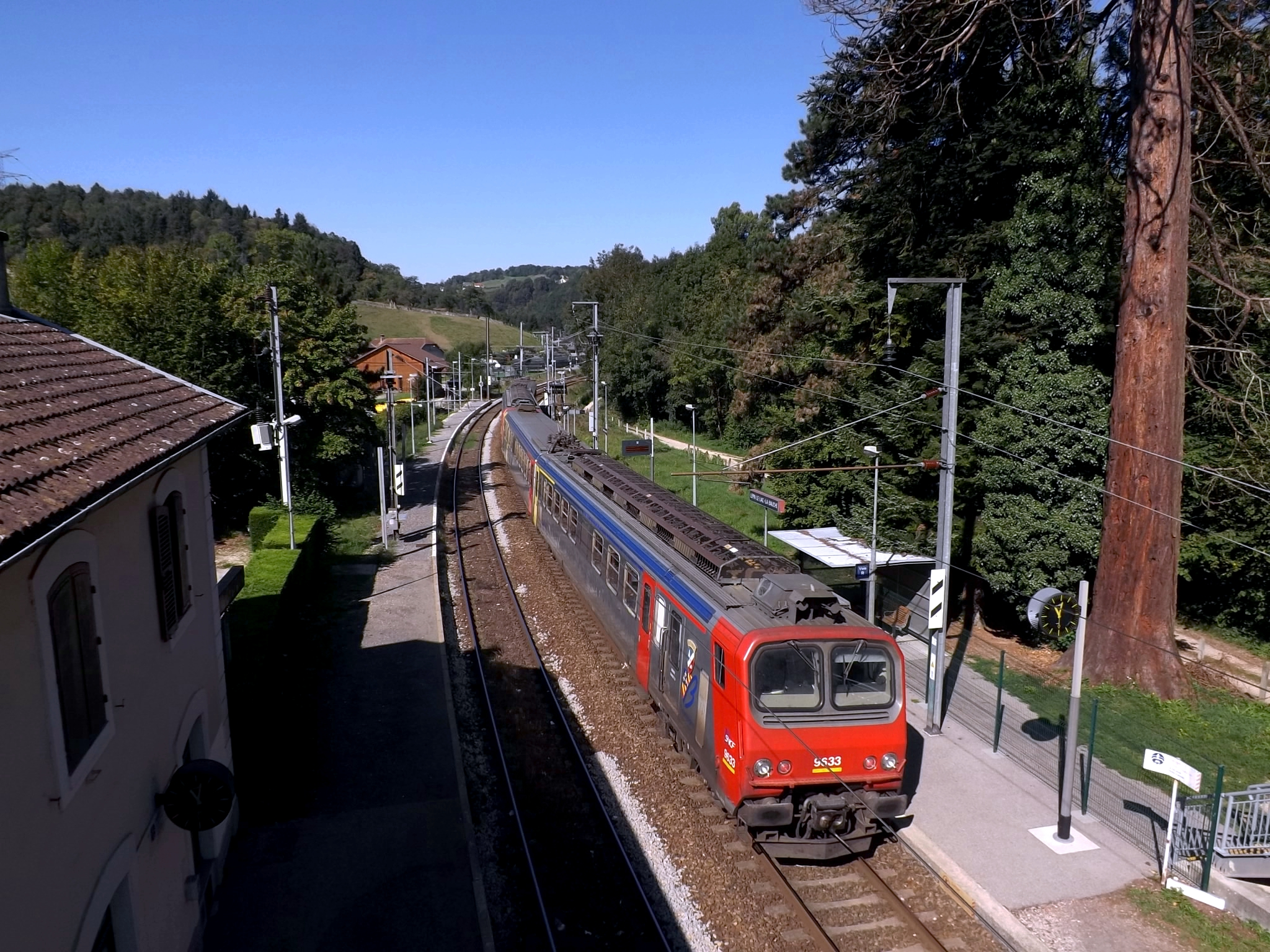
Lépin-le-Lac-La Bauche station

== See also ==
- Communes of the Savoie department
