= Aiguebelette-le-Lac =

Aiguebelette-le-Lac Égouabelèta (Arpitan)
- Commune
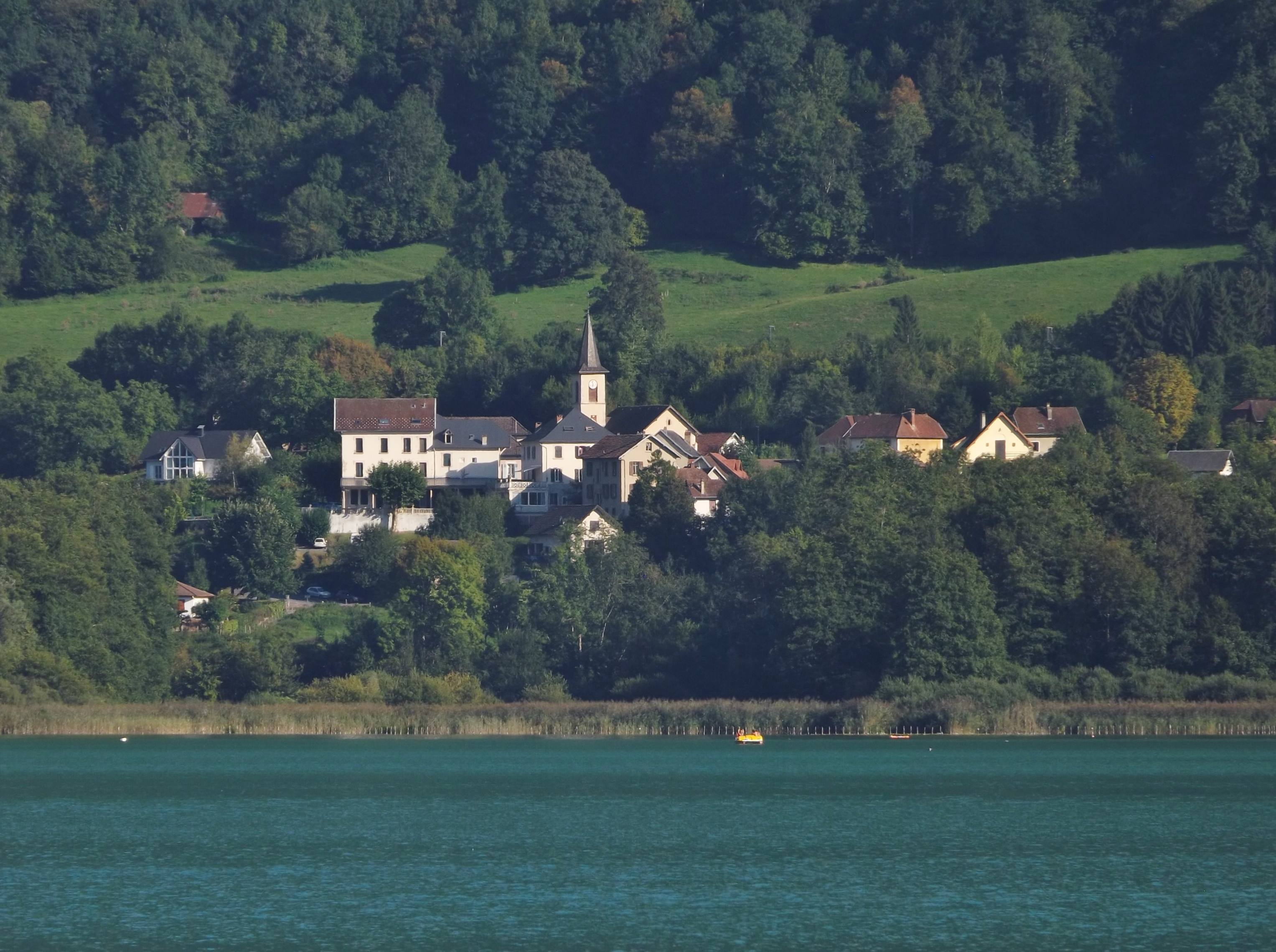
- A view of Aiguebelette-le-Lac

- Coat of arms
- Location of Aiguebelette-le-Lac
- Location within France Location within Auvergne-Rhône-Alpes
- Coordinates: 45°32′19″N 5°48′56″E
- Country: France
- Region: Auvergne-Rhône-Alpes
- Department: Savoie
- Arrondissement: Chambéry
- Canton: Le Pont-de-Beauvoisin
- Intercommunality: CC du Lac d'Aiguebelette

Government
  - Mayor (2020–2026): Claude Coutaz
- Area^{1}: 7.91 km^{2} (3.05 sq mi)
- Highest elevation: 1,360 m (4,460 ft)
- Lowest elevation: 372 m (1,220 ft)
- Population (2023): 255
  - Density: 32.2/km^{2} (83.5/sq mi)
- Demonym: Aiguebelettois
- Time zone: UTC+01:00 (CET)
  - Summer (DST): UTC+02:00 (CEST)
- INSEE/Postal code: 73001 /73610
- ^{1} French Land Register data, which excludes lakes, ponds, glaciers > 1 km^{2} (0.386 sq mi or 247 acres) and river estuaries.

Aiguebelette-le-Lac (French pronunciation: [ɛɡbəlɛt lə lak]; lit. 'Aiguebelette-the-Lake'; Arpitan: Égouabelèta), also simply known as Aiguebelette, is a rural commune in the Savoie department in the Auvergne-Rhône-Alpes region in Southeastern France. As of 2023, the population of the commune was 255. It is named after and lies on the southeastern shore of the Lac d'Aiguebelette, one of the largest natural lakes in the area. Le Port, north of the village of Aiguebelette-le-Lac and part of the commune, has a small lakeside marina, with a beach.

The commune also contains the Château d'Aiguebelette-le-Lac, a medieval structure (early 14th century) in a ruinous state, while the main church in the village centre, the Église Saint-André, dedicated to Saint Andrew, was restored in 1854.

== History ==
During the period of occupation of the Duchy of Savoy by the French revolutionary troops, following the annexation of 1792, the commune belonged to the canton of Le Pont-de-Beauvoisin, in the Mont-Blanc department.

During the Second World War, Aiguebelette-le-Lac, located in an unoccupied zone, was the scene of a significant event with the house arrest of many foreign Jewish families living in hotels at the time. On 26 August 1942 these families underwent a roundup organised by the French police under the orders of the government of Vichy. Many of them were deported and murdered in Auschwitz. The neighbouring lakeside communes of Lépin-le-Lac and Saint-Alban-de-Montbel were also affected by this policy of regrouping foreign Jews to deport them.

== Geography ==
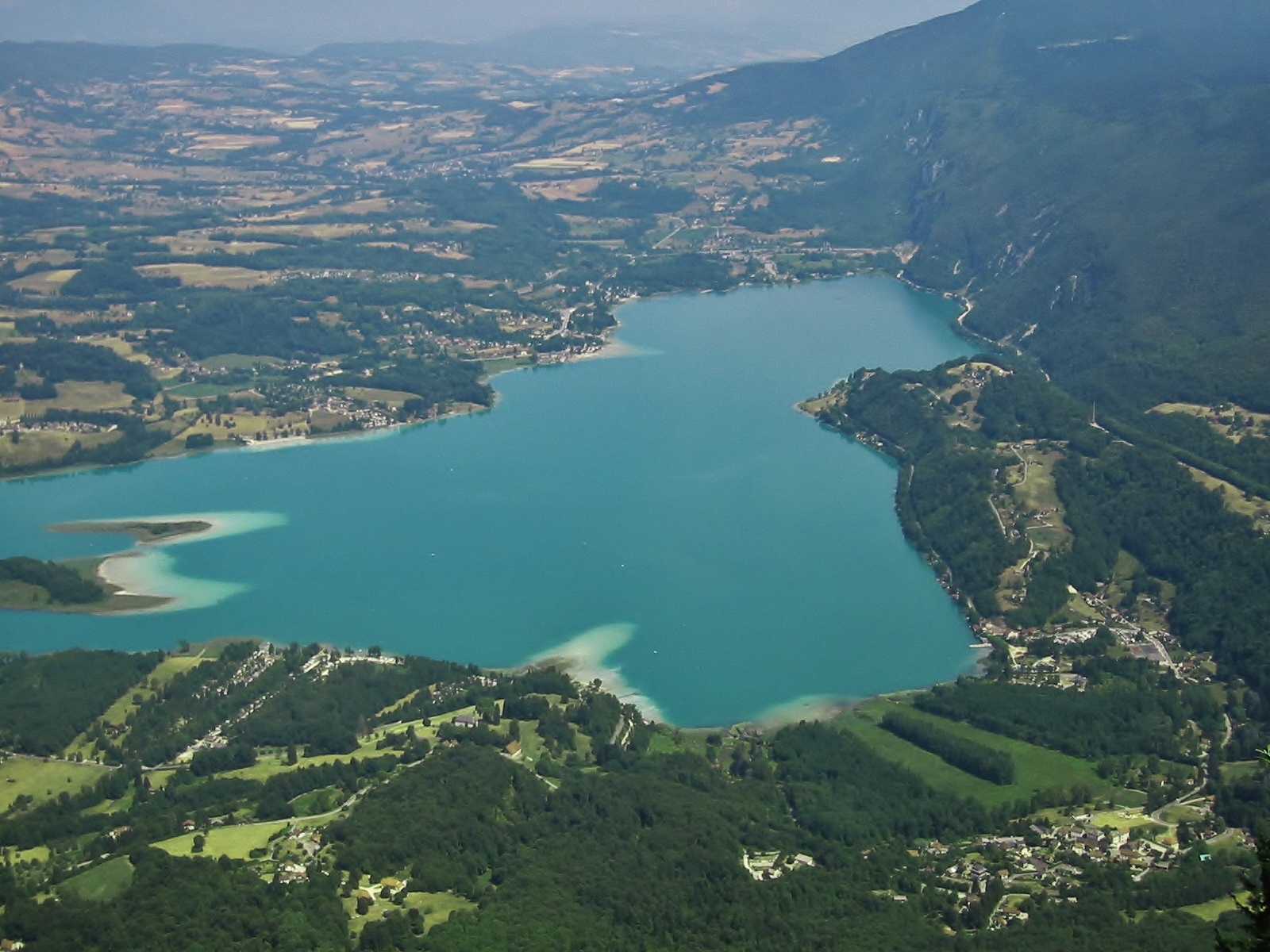
Panoramic view of Lake Aiguebelette. The village of Aiguebelette-le-Lac lies in the southeast corner of the picture.

The village of Aiguebelette-le-Lac lies near the southeastern shore of Lac d'Aiguebelette. There is a port and beach on the lake to the north of the town on the shore at Le Port.

The commune contains the hamlets of Les Allamans, Les Cambet, La Combe, La Girardière, Le Noyau, Les Prés, Le Port, Les Gustin, Le Bourg, Le Boyat, Côte-Épine, Les Combettes, Le Cugnet, Les Culées, Le Fayet, Malacôte, Le Sauget and Le Platon.

== Landmarks ==
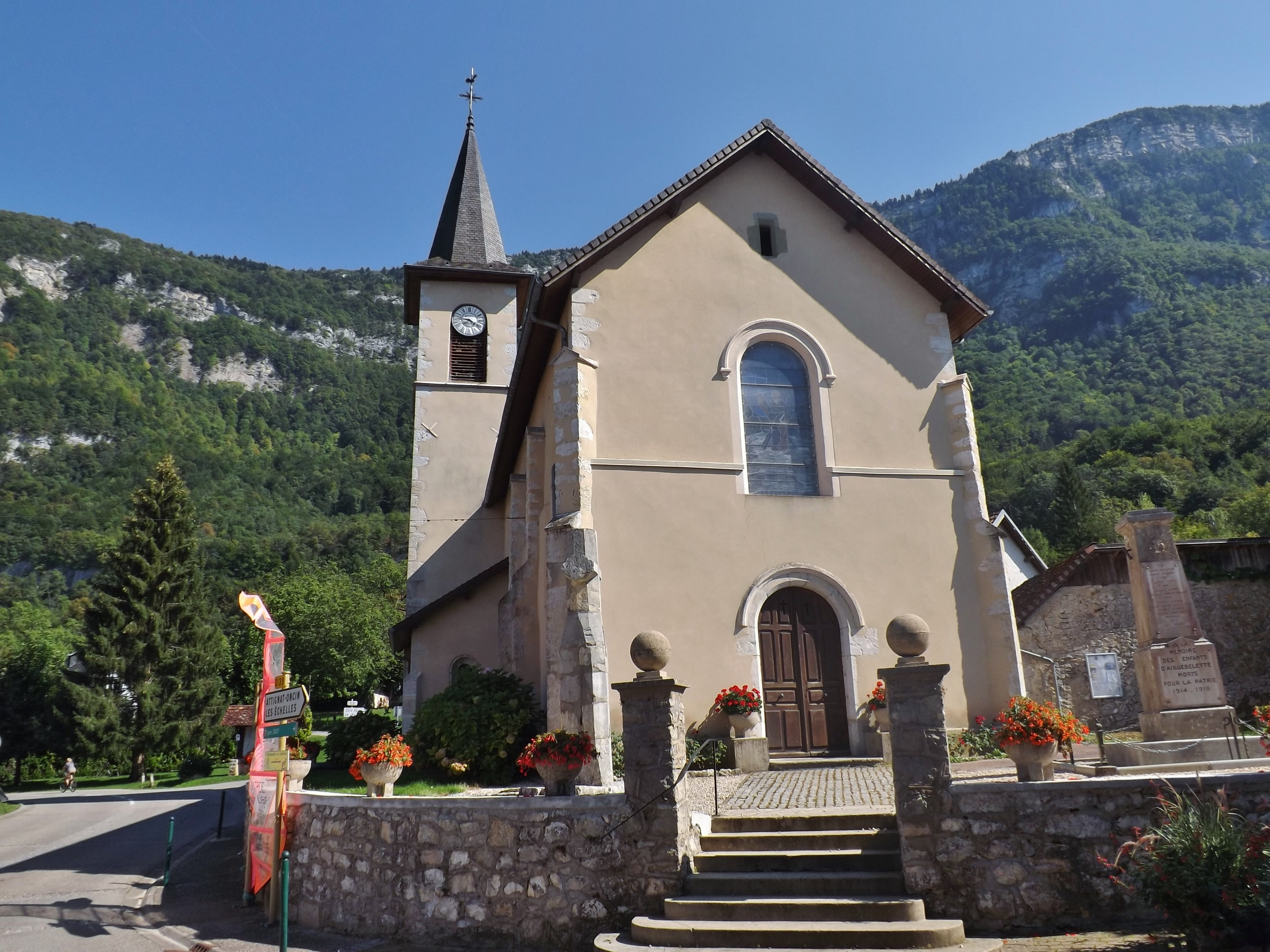
The church

There are the remains of a fortified village in the vicinity, with the door to an old medieval enclosure. There are also prehistoric pile-dwelling (or stilt house) settlements that are part of the Prehistoric Pile dwellings around the Alps UNESCO World Heritage Site.

The Château d'Aiguebelette is in a ruinous state. In 1317 it was mentioned in an act passed by Dauphin. The main church in the area is dedicated to Saint Andrew (Saint André). It was restored in 1854.

== Transport ==
The D9210 road passes through Aiguebelette-le-Lac and skirts the eastern shore of the lake, leading to A43 autoroute. The commune is served by Aiguebelette-le-Lac station, on the TER Auvergne-Rhône-Alpes railway line from Saint-André-le-Gaz to Chambéry. The nearest airport is at Chambéry Airport.

== See also ==
- Communes of the Savoie department
