= Mont Tournier =

Mountain in Savoie, France

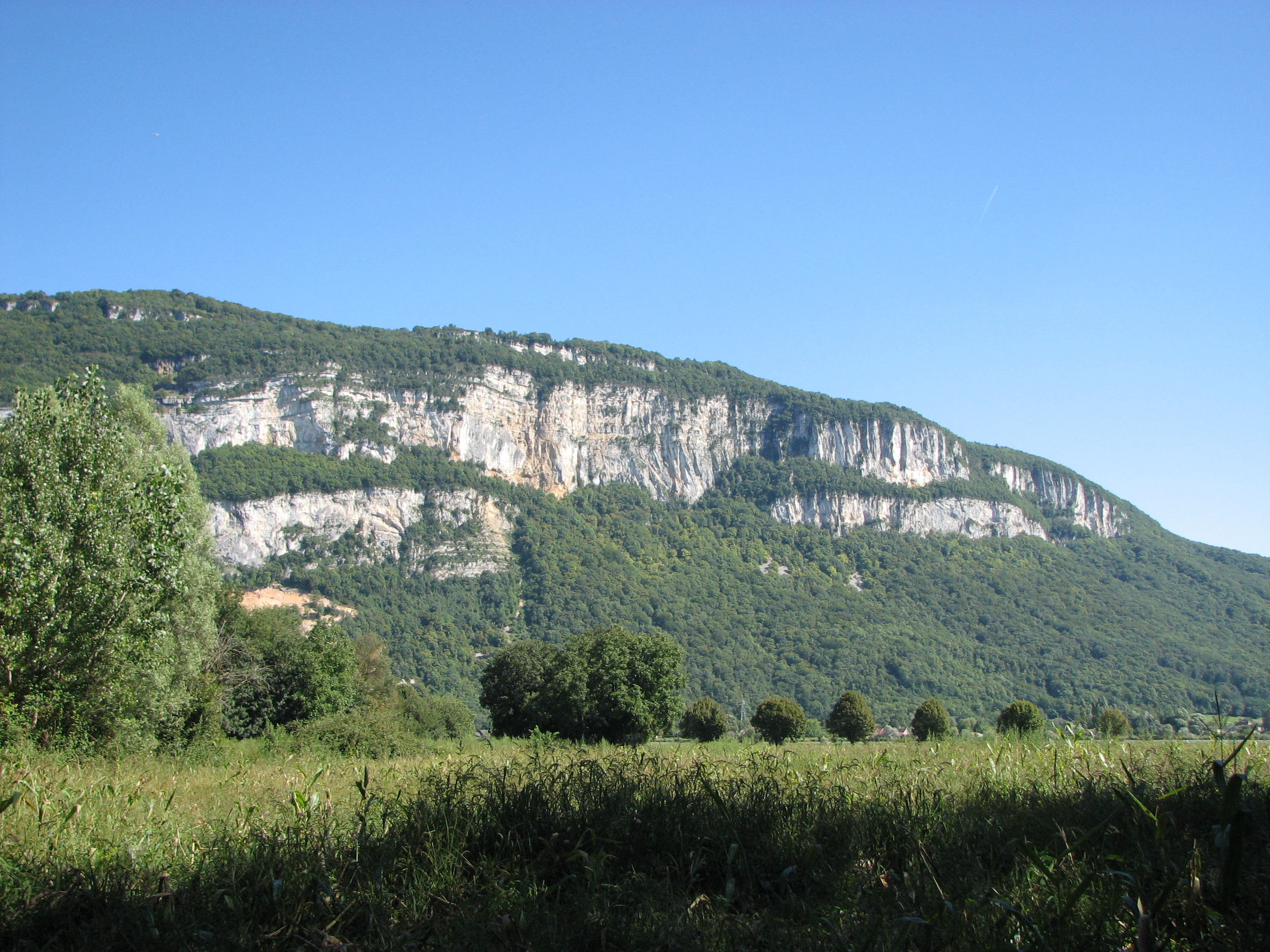
- Mont Tournier.

Highest point
- Elevation: 877 m (2,877 ft)
- Coordinates: 45°38′24″N 05°42′19″E

Geography
- Location within France
- Location: Savoie, France
- Parent range: Jura

Mont Tournier is a mountain of Savoie, France. It lies in the Jura range. It has an elevation of 877 metres (2,877 ft) above sea level.
