= Novalaise =

Novalaise Novalaze (Savoyard)
- Commune
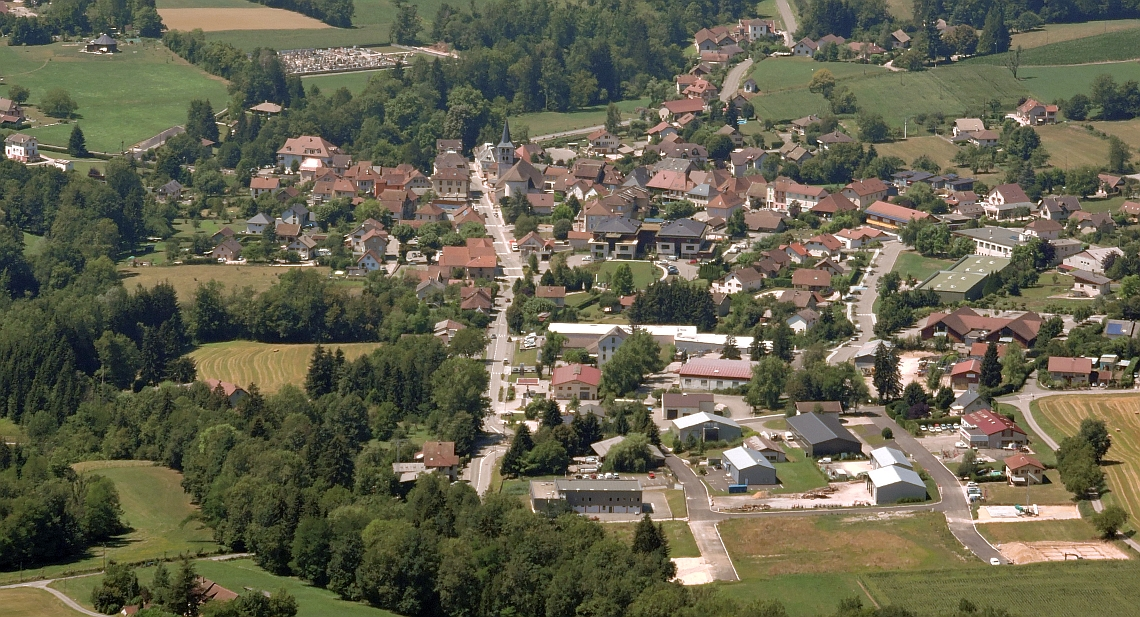
- Location of Novalaise
- Location within France Location within Auvergne-Rhône-Alpes
- Coordinates: 45°35′43″N 5°46′20″E
- Country: France
- Region: Auvergne-Rhône-Alpes
- Department: Savoie
- Arrondissement: Chambéry
- Canton: Bugey savoyard
- Intercommunality: lac d'Aiguebelette

Government
  - Mayor (2020–2026): Claudine Tavel
- Area^{1}: 16.26 km^{2} (6.28 sq mi)
- Highest elevation: 1,160 m (3,810 ft)
- Lowest elevation: 371 m (1,217 ft)
- Population (2023): 2,261
  - Density: 139.1/km^{2} (360.1/sq mi)
- Time zone: UTC+01:00 (CET)
  - Summer (DST): UTC+02:00 (CEST)
- INSEE/Postal code: 73191 /73470
- Website: www.novalaise.fr
- ^{1} French Land Register data, which excludes lakes, ponds, glaciers > 1 km^{2} (0.386 sq mi or 247 acres) and river estuaries.

Novalaise (French pronunciation: [nɔvalɛz]; Savoyard: Novalaze) is a commune in the Savoie department in the Auvergne-Rhône-Alpes region in south-eastern France.

== Geography ==
=== Climate ===
Novalaise has an oceanic climate (Köppen climate classification Cfb). The average annual temperature in Novalaise is 10.9 °C (51.6 °F). The average annual rainfall is 1,443.4 mm (56.83 in) with November as the wettest month. The temperatures are highest on average in July, at around 20.2 °C (68.4 °F), and lowest in January, at around 1.9 °C (35.4 °F). The highest temperature ever recorded in Novalaise was 39.5 °C (103.1 °F) on 13 August 2003; the coldest temperature ever recorded was −25.0 °C (−13.0 °F) on 7 January 1985.

Climate data for Novalaise (1991−2020 normals, extremes 1967−present)
Month	Jan	Feb	Mar	Apr	May	Jun	Jul	Aug	Sep	Oct	Nov	Dec	Year
Record high °C (°F)	20.3 (68.5)	22.0 (71.6)	26.5 (79.7)	29.4 (84.9)	32.7 (90.9)	37.1 (98.8)	39.0 (102.2)	39.5 (103.1)	33.0 (91.4)	28.0 (82.4)	24.6 (76.3)	21.0 (69.8)	39.5 (103.1)
Mean daily maximum °C (°F)	5.8 (42.4)	7.8 (46.0)	12.7 (54.9)	16.7 (62.1)	20.8 (69.4)	24.9 (76.8)	27.3 (81.1)	26.9 (80.4)	21.7 (71.1)	16.5 (61.7)	10.1 (50.2)	6.1 (43.0)	16.4 (61.5)
Daily mean °C (°F)	1.9 (35.4)	3.0 (37.4)	6.9 (44.4)	10.3 (50.5)	14.4 (57.9)	18.2 (64.8)	20.2 (68.4)	19.9 (67.8)	15.7 (60.3)	11.5 (52.7)	6.0 (42.8)	2.5 (36.5)	10.9 (51.6)
Mean daily minimum °C (°F)	−2.0 (28.4)	−1.8 (28.8)	1.1 (34.0)	3.9 (39.0)	8.0 (46.4)	11.5 (52.7)	13.2 (55.8)	13.0 (55.4)	9.6 (49.3)	6.5 (43.7)	1.9 (35.4)	−1.2 (29.8)	5.3 (41.5)
Record low °C (°F)	−25.0 (−13.0)	−18.1 (−0.6)	−15.4 (4.3)	−8.5 (16.7)	−2.0 (28.4)	1.0 (33.8)	4.0 (39.2)	2.5 (36.5)	−1.0 (30.2)	−6.5 (20.3)	−12.1 (10.2)	−17.8 (0.0)	−25.0 (−13.0)
Average precipitation mm (inches)	111.3 (4.38)	95.3 (3.75)	111.0 (4.37)	115.1 (4.53)	136.7 (5.38)	120.7 (4.75)	116.8 (4.60)	108.4 (4.27)	125.5 (4.94)	134.0 (5.28)	138.5 (5.45)	130.1 (5.12)	1,443.4 (56.83)
Average precipitation days (≥ 1.0 mm)	11.5	10.4	11.2	10.8	12.7	11.1	9.1	9.1	9.4	11.6	12.2	12.2	131.4
Source: Météo-France

== Population ==
Historical population
Year	Pop.	±% p.a.
1968	735	—
1975	802	+1.25%
1982	1,017	+3.45%
1990	1,234	+2.45%
1999	1,432	+1.67%
2007	1,712	+2.26%
2012	1,942	+2.55%
2017	2,071	+1.29%
2023	2,261	+1.47%
Source: INSEE

== See also ==
- Communes of the Savoie department
