= Saint-Alban-de-Montbel =

Saint-Alban-de-Montbel Sant Arban (Savoyard)
- Commune
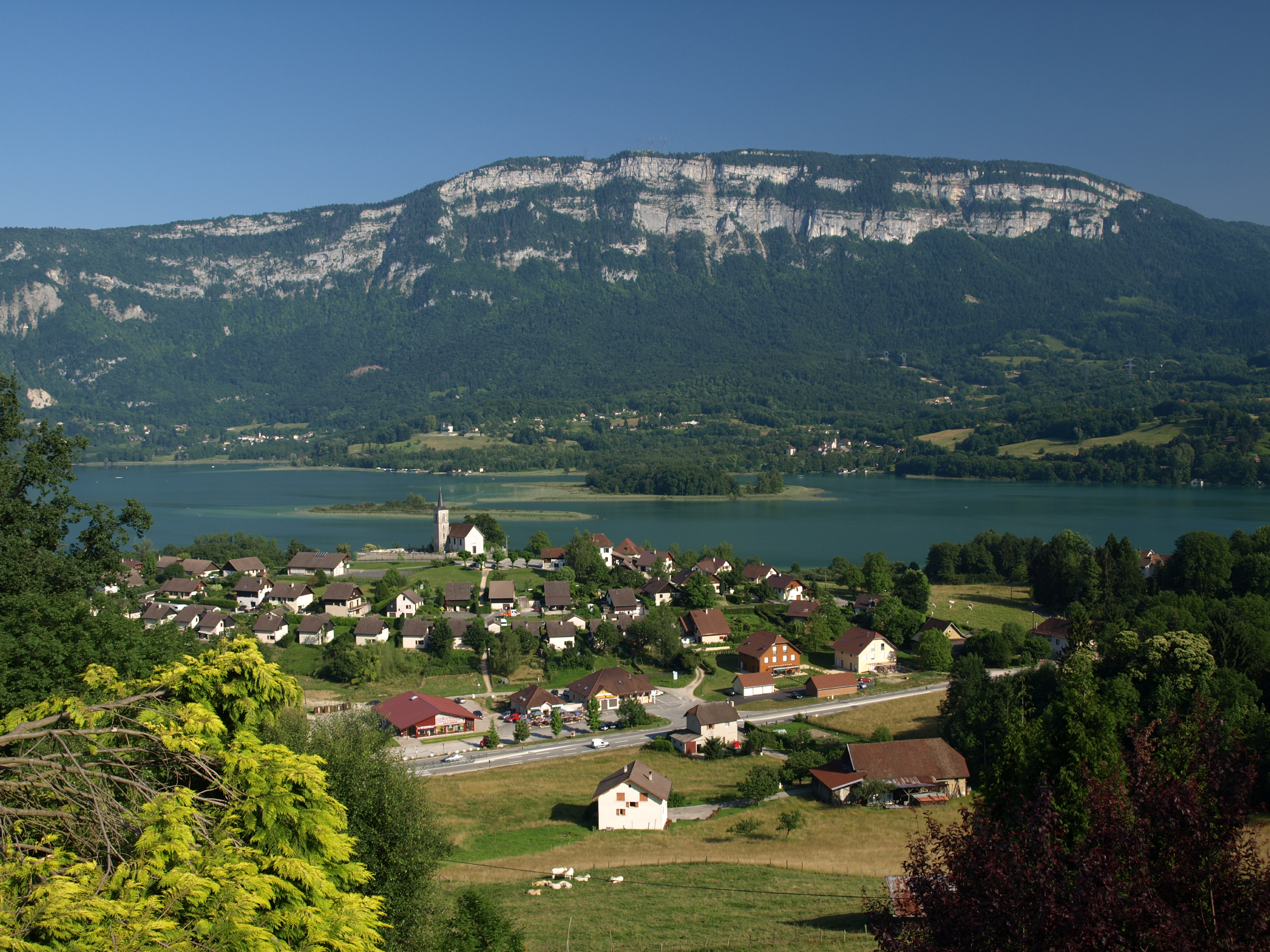
- View of the church of Saint-Alban-de-Montbel and Lac d'Aiguebelette
- Location of Saint-Alban-de-Montbel
- Location within France Location within Auvergne-Rhône-Alpes
- Coordinates: 45°33′09″N 5°47′03″E
- Country: France
- Region: Auvergne-Rhône-Alpes
- Department: Savoie
- Arrondissement: Chambéry
- Canton: Le Pont-de-Beauvoisin
- Intercommunality: CC du Lac d'Aiguebelette

Government
  - Mayor (2020–2026): Pierre Duperchy
- Area^{1}: 4.55 km^{2} (1.76 sq mi)
- Highest elevation: 528 m (1,732 ft)
- Lowest elevation: 372 m (1,220 ft)
- Population (2023): 688
  - Density: 151/km^{2} (392/sq mi)
- Demonym: Saint-Albanais
- Time zone: UTC+01:00 (CET)
  - Summer (DST): UTC+02:00 (CEST)
- INSEE/Postal code: 73219 /73610
- Website: stalbandemontbel.fr
- ^{1} French Land Register data, which excludes lakes, ponds, glaciers > 1 km^{2} (0.386 sq mi or 247 acres) and river estuaries.

Saint-Alban-de-Montbel (French pronunciation: [sɛ̃.t‿albɑ̃ d(ə) mɔ̃bɛl]; Savoyard: Sant Arban) is a rural commune in the Savoie department in the Auvergne-Rhône-Alpes region in Southeastern France.

== World Heritage Site ==
It is home to one or more prehistoric pile-dwelling (or stilt house) settlements that are part of the Prehistoric Pile dwellings around the Alps UNESCO World Heritage Site.

== See also ==
- Communes of the Savoie department
