= Nances =

Nances Nanse (Savoyard)
- Commune
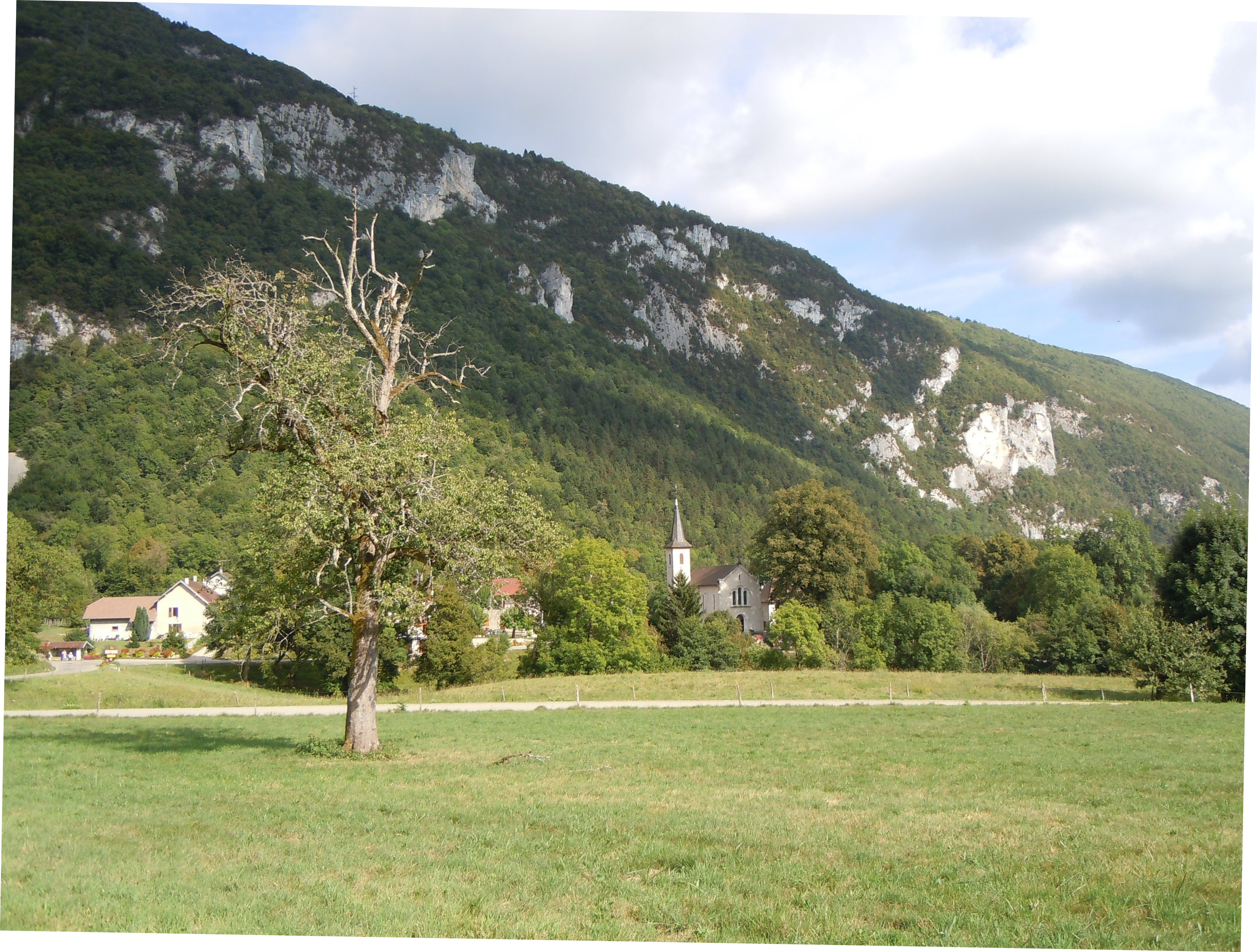
- The church and landscape of Nances

- Coat of arms
- Location of Nances
- Location within France Location within Auvergne-Rhône-Alpes
- Coordinates: 45°35′28″N 5°47′51″E
- Country: France
- Region: Auvergne-Rhône-Alpes
- Department: Savoie
- Arrondissement: Chambéry
- Canton: Le Pont-de-Beauvoisin
- Intercommunality: Lac d'Aiguebelette

Government
  - Mayor (2020–2026): Alexandre Fauge
- Area^{1}: 9.9 km^{2} (3.8 sq mi)
- Highest elevation: 1,243 m (4,078 ft)
- Lowest elevation: 373 m (1,224 ft)
- Population (2023): 554
  - Density: 56/km^{2} (140/sq mi)
- Time zone: UTC+01:00 (CET)
  - Summer (DST): UTC+02:00 (CEST)
- INSEE/Postal code: 73184 /73470
- Website: www.nancesensavoie.fr
- ^{1} French Land Register data, which excludes lakes, ponds, glaciers > 1 km^{2} (0.386 sq mi or 247 acres) and river estuaries.

Nances (French pronunciation: [nɑ̃s]; Savoyard: Nanse) is a commune in the Savoie department in the Auvergne-Rhône-Alpes region in south-eastern France.

== See also ==
- Communes of the Savoie department
