= Savoyard nationalism =

Political movement in France

Savoyard nationalism refers to a range of cultural movements (including associations and learned societies) and political movements (autonomist, regionalist, or independentist) that seek recognition of a distinct identity linked to the historical region of Savoy. This region corresponds to the present-day French departments of Savoie and Haute-Savoie, which are the successors to the former Duchy of Savoy.

Savoyard nationalism emerged in the 19th century in response to the unification of the Italian peninsula—the Risorgimento—led by the House of Savoy. The movement emphasized the French language in a region that had become predominantly Italian. It reached its peak during the debates preceding the annexation of Savoy to France under the Treaty of Turin in 1860, when local opinion was divided over the region’s political future. Proposed options included remaining under the House of Savoy, uniting with France, creating a new Swiss canton incorporating part of the former duchy, or, more rarely, pursuing independence for the duchy.

Following Savoy’s union with imperial and later republican France, most Savoyard nationalist and regionalist claims largely disappeared. They reemerged in the 1960s, after the centenary of the annexation, and again during debates on regionalization in 1972 (Law no. 72-619 of 5 July 1972 establishing and organizing the regions). Since the annexation in 1860, the Savoyard regionalist and nationalist movement has not achieved significant electoral influence nor produced prominent figures. However, it gained renewed visibility in the late 1990s with the emergence of a “de-annexationist” movement advocating for a regionalist agenda.

== Definition of Savoyard identity ==
=== Historical and cultural foundations of Savoyard identity ===
In Histoire de la Savoie en images: images & récits (2006), historian Christian Sorrel devotes a chapter to “Savoy in search of identity,” identifying the region’s two main markers as its mountains and history. As early as 1941, in the regionalist journal Revue de Savoie, Commander Émile Gaillard described Savoyard identity based on four criteria: geographical unity, recognition of history, a self-sufficient economy, and cultural uniformity, including the “homogeneity of the population.” Other aspects of Savoyard identity include the Savoyard language, part of the Franco-Provençal linguistic area, and the Catholic religion; however, these elements are not unique to the region and are part of a broader cultural context.

The history of Savoy is closely linked to the emergence of the House of Savoy, which originated in the County of Maurienne in the 11th century. The successive counts of Maurienne, and later of Savoy, gained control over territories including Savoie Propre, Tarentaise, and Chablais, followed by the acquisition of Genevois and Faucigny, sometimes through conflict. These territories formed the six historical provinces that became the Duchy of Savoy, which in 1860 was divided into the present-day departments of Savoie and Haute-Savoie. Other territories were also part of the early Savoyard states. The counts and later dukes of Savoy pursued policies of territorial expansion southward toward Italy, culminating in the transfer of the capital from Chambéry to Turin in 1562 under Duke Emmanuel Philibert. This move reflected both the growing importance of the Italian territories within the Savoyard states and the strategic aim of protecting the duchy from the Kingdom of France to the west.

=== Affirmation of Savoyard particularism and contemporary changes ===
Within this ensemble, Savoyards occupied only a limited place. It was not until the 18th century that claims marked by a certain particularism appeared, which became more pronounced at the beginning of the 19th century. The first movement that can be highlighted concerned the use of language. The provinces of Savoy had been French-speaking since at least the 14th century within a state dominated by the Tuscan language. These provinces officially used French for civil records from the 16th century, in accordance with the Ordinance of Villers-Cotterêts of 1539, at a time when the duchy was occupied by French troops. The application of this ordinance, however, remained uneven. In practice, French was already the common vehicular language from the 14th century and became the administrative language under Emmanuel Philibert following an edict of 11 or 15 February 1560, which replaced Latin in judicial acts. What is referred to as Italian was never used by the administration in Savoy; at that time, however, Tuscan was imposed in the Italian-side territories of the Savoyard states. In line with this linguistic particularism, the deputies representing Savoy at the beginning of the 19th century expressed themselves in French: “The Italian language is the official language of the Chambers. However, it is optional to use the French language, either for members belonging to regions where that language is in use, or in order to reply to them.” Despite the political nuances of the period between liberals and conservatives, they generally agreed in defending the right to a certain autonomy, or at least the recognition of local particularism.

During the second half of the 19th century, Savoy experienced significant political, demographic, and cultural changes. The annexation to France in 1860, major migrations, and the decline of linguistic distinctions, along with the emergence of an industrial bourgeoisie, marked this period. The agrarian economy was supplemented by industrial development, notably through hydroelectric power, and the beginnings of tourism, which had a considerable impact on the traditional identity of the region. After being a land of emigration in the 19th century, with a population loss of just over 10%, Savoy became a land of immigration; by 1999, it was estimated that more than 40% of the million inhabitants of the departments were born elsewhere. Under these conditions, defining and promoting a local identity is considered challenging by many observers of the region.

=== Territorial unity, internal divisions, and debates on identity ===
Defining Savoyard territorial unity may be difficult. While Joseph de Maistre in 1814 had been concerned by the “unbearable division of the indivisible” following the restoration of the Kingdom of Sardinia, today Savoy is often referred to as the Pays de Savoie, highlighting sub-regional differences. The geographer Pierre Préau observed: (Note: Pierre Préau (1929) was an agrégé in geography and a political scientist, a lecturer at Sciences Po Grenoble and professor emeritus at the University of Savoy. He was the author of numerous works on the region.) “Let us not hide behind our little finger. If we want it, if it makes sense, if Savoyards look in the same direction (and not some toward Geneva, others toward Lyon… and in any case none toward Grenoble!), the unity of Savoy is not a heritage to be preserved, but a reality of tomorrow to be built: an ambition.” The two departments and their cities do not always show perfect alignment. The historical capital of the dukes of Savoy, Chambéry, now the prefecture of Savoie, does not always share the same orientation as Annecy, the prefecture of Haute-Savoie. (Note: In the Middle Ages, the Counties of Savoy and Geneva were opposed to each other, until the latter was purchased by the former in 1401.) Chambéry, sometimes called the “Gateway to the Alps” and located on the Paris–Rome axis, tends to look toward Paris, while Annecy contends with the polarizing influence of Geneva, the economic capital of the region. The historical division of Savoy into six provinces (Note: The six historical provinces making up Savoy are: Savoy Proper, sometimes also called Ducal Savoy; Maurienne; Tarentaise; Chablais; Genevois; and Faucigny. Jacques Lovie, in his work, added the Avant-pays.) also challenges this unity, partially placing the major intra-Alpine valleys of the Arve, Arly, Isère, and Arc outside the control of the two capitals. This compartmentalization of Savoy has shaped a regional identity, reflected in 19th-century mutual aid societies among Savoyard migrants. Jacques Lovie has described this identity as a layered attachment: “Perhaps no one worries more about being of his country and his province than the Savoyard: belonging to the village, to the valley, to an ensemble…”

Despite the assertion of a Savoyard identity, its definition sometimes remains limited and led the Savoyard historian André Palluel-Guillard to state:

Unlike the Swiss, who managed to build a single myth around the civilization of the cow, the Savoyards, in their desire to be assimilated into France, allowed an imagery made up of folk dances and exceptional landscapes to develop (…) (It has become) a kind of soft underbelly, without a language, without a distinctive religion, and without an elite.

— André Palluel-Guillard (Note: André Palluel-Guillard, honorary professor at the University of Savoy. Quotation taken from the bimonthly Alpes Magazines, dossier “Savoyards, who are you?”, issue no. 51 published in May–June 1998. Almost ten years later, he reiterated this observation in an issue of L’Express: “Once incorporated into France, Savoy ceased to exist as such, just like its elite—a classic attitude of the center toward peripheral populations. For example, one of my former historian colleagues never dared to say, in Paris, that he was a professor at the University of Savoy, here in Chambéry.”)

== History of Savoyard nationalism ==
The history of Savoyard nationalism can be divided into chronological and thematic phases, according to the objectives pursued.

The history of Savoyard identity can be divided into several periods. During the pre-annexation period, Savoyards sought greater recognition of the Duchy of Savoy within the Kingdom of Piedmont-Sardinia. This was followed by a long period of integration into France under the Empire and the Third Republic. In the 1960s and 1970s, cultural movements promoting local identity developed into political movements advocating for the establishment of a “Savoy Region.” These movements lost momentum with the decentralization policies implemented by the French state. From the 1990s onward, a new current emerged, with some advocating for Savoyard sovereignty in the context of an identity debate, while others pursued greater regional autonomy within the framework of national discussions on local governance.

=== Nationalism before 1860 ===
Savoyard nationalism developed in the 19th century in the context of the Italian policies of the House of Savoy. Charles Albert of Sardinia and his successors promoted the Risorgimento, which was met with varying degrees of acceptance by Savoyard politicians, as illustrated by the position of the deputy Charles de Menthon d’Aviernoz. The development of Savoyard particularism was largely based on opposition to Italian policy, perceived as a distancing of the House of Savoy from its historical territory. Savoyards emphasized elements that distinguished them from the inhabitants of the Italian peninsula, including language, politics, religion, and local values—identity markers shaped by a mountainous environment, a history of 17th- and 18th-century conflicts, and a tradition of local autonomy with a strong sense of belonging to the parish or province.

Historian Christian Sorrel summarizes Savoyard attitudes as emphasizing social stability, attachment to traditional knowledge and skills, sustained effort, respect for their environment, and a sense of belonging to the community, the valley, or Savoy.

At the beginning of the 19th century, the question of the duchy’s unity was a significant concern. Following the end of the Empire in 1814, (Note: For this period, see the detailed articles: History of Savoy (1792–1815) and History of Savoy from 1815 to 1860.) the Treaty of Paris restored the Alpine part of the duchy to the House of Savoy, while the remaining portion remained in France as the department of Mont-Blanc. The second Treaty of Paris in 1815 reunited Savoy.

==== A growing gap between Savoy and the future Italy ====
Savoyards perceived themselves as a minority within a kingdom focused on the unification of the Italian peninsula, often treated differently from other subjects, who were primarily non-French-speaking (except in the Aosta Valley) and invested in Italian unification. This sentiment was expressed through criticism of the administration of the Duchy of Savoy, where local inhabitants sought to maintain influence while officials from beyond the Alps were more numerous. (Note: According to Geneviève Dardel: “First of all, the shocking inequality of ranks and positions in the administration. If Savoy was now an integral part of the Kingdom of Piedmont-Sardinia, it would have been fair for Savoyards to be employed in the service of His Majesty in the same proportion as Italians. But this was not the case. For a few dozen of them receiving, east of the Alps, positions and titles—exactly 54 out of 2,726 civil servants—there were twenty times more Piedmontese representing the king to the west—1,423 Italians out of 1,895 civil servants,” cited by Dardel, Geneviève (1960). Et la Savoie devint française... [And Savoy became French...] (in French). Paris: Librairie Arthème Fayard. pp. 41–42. According to Jacques Lovie: “In 1851, there were 3 Savoyards out of 630 employees in the Ministries of War, Public Works, the Chamber of Accounts, the intendancies and military hospitals; 11 out of 204 in the Ministries of Foreign Affairs, Justice, and the Interior; and 2 out of 215 in the Ministry of Public Instruction and the four state universities.” Quotation taken from Bro and Barbier, 1998, cited work, p. 28. The authors cite information drawn from Lovie 1963, pp. 79–80.) Historian Robert Avezou identifies approximately twenty petitions submitted by seventy-nine Savoyard deputies to the Parliament of Turin concerning the duchy. These petitions addressed issues such as the evolution of regional powers (1850), economic development (1850–1858), redistribution of public positions in favor of Savoyards, and language-based appointments within the Savoy Brigade (1852). Collectively, these actions formed a bloc opposing aspects of the Risorgimento policies.

General Charles de Menthon d’Aviernoz, who opposed a possible union with France, exemplified the Savoyard focus on local identity and relative indifference to the Risorgimento. In a speech before the Parliament on 3 March 1852, he stated that he neither approved nor disapproved of the Statute granted by the king, accepting it without having requested it. He described Savoy as having two borders—France and the Alps—and affirmed his identity as Savoyard, united with Piedmont, rather than Italian or French. He encouraged his colleagues to follow their own political or national orientations. The speech was delivered in response to criticism from Piedmontese deputies following the emergence of a separatist, pro-French party, and he was mocked by some of his Piedmontese colleagues during the address.

Savoyard nationalism was also reflected in the revival of local learned societies, which sought to preserve the cultural and historical identity of the duchy. In response to the perception that the House of Savoy was distancing itself from its historical territory, Savoyard elites focused on the study and promotion of the culture of their region.

Tensions increased in early 1860, when Victor Emmanuel II of Savoy, King of Sardinia and Duke of Savoy, allied with Napoleon III, Emperor of the French, in the policy of Italian unification. Savoyard nationalism reached its peak during the preliminary discussions of the Treaty of Turin and the related negotiations concerning Savoy and Nice between France and the Kingdom of Piedmont-Sardinia. (Note: For this period, see the detailed articles: History of Savoy from 1815 to 1860 and Annexation of Savoy.)

==== Concerns about annexation ====
While the Kingdom of Sardinia adopted liberal ideas, Savoyards, although interested in these ideas, generally did not rise against their king and maintained a conservative stance, influenced in part by the clergy. The adoption of the Albertine Statute on 4 March 1848 by Charles Albert of Sardinia brought local political differences to the forefront. After the Revolution of 1848, which caused concern among the Savoyard bourgeoisie, the First Italian War of Independence generated limited enthusiasm in the region. The deputy from Aix, Gustave de Martinel, expressed this sentiment in the Turin Chamber on 1 March 1849, noting that while the war was popular in Piedmont, it did not resonate in Savoy. (Note: Gustave de Martinel, Aix-les-Bains, deputy to the Parliament of Sardinia (1853–1860), in Mouxy de Loche, Jules (1978). Histoire d'Aix-les-Bains [History of Aix-les-Bains] (in French). Imprimerie Savoisienne. p. 333.) When King Victor Emmanuel II and his minister Cavour sought the support of the French Empire, they anticipated that France would request concessions, leading to rumors of a possible future annexation of Savoy.

In this context, Canon Antoine Martinet wrote an independentist pamphlet entitled What should Savoy do? (Note: “What should Savoy do? By a Savoyard,” by Canon Antoine Martinet (2 June 1802–1871), nephew of the Archbishop of Tarentaise, Antoine Martinet. His pamphlet was republished in 2005 by Éditions Bénévent, in Antoine Martinet, What Should Savoy Do?, Carouge, A. Jaquemot / Printing House of La Voix Catholique, 1848. Canon Martinet, who disapproved of an annexation to Switzerland, also wrote: “In the event of abandonment by Italy, Savoy must not relinquish the inviolable right it would have to administer itself, to govern itself. This right cannot be taken away from it either by a treaty not consented to by it, or by a force majeure that would merely suspend its exercise. Even if oppression were to last, it would only strengthen the right of the victims to break their chains on the day when the barbaric right of the sword would be threatened by the sword…”) Considering the possibility of Savoy being ceded to France, he stated that “if unfortunately this eventuality were to come about,” it was already necessary to examine the solutions to be adopted. He continued: “I will at least have sought to protect my fellow citizens against two ignominies, the mere thought of which fills me with horror: the ignominy of a sale prepared by a few traitors, favored by the fear of the many, consummated by a cowardly hypocritical vote. The other ignominy, no less intolerable, would be a partition that would impose upon our nation the fate of a herd of cattle.” In his History of Moûtiers, Jean-Paul Bergeri (Note: Jean-Paul Bergeri (born in 1957) is president of the Moûtiers Tourist Office.) interprets the text differently: “Savoy is therefore a people, but a very small people in the concert of nations. How will it be able to defend its autonomy, that is to say its absolute independence?” Martinet then considers the hypothesis of an independent Savoy allied with another power that could help defend it, turning toward France in this regard. He noted that Savoy, “through its industry, its commerce, its language, do we not follow the slope of our waters?”, naturally oriented toward France. This idea was echoed by Antoine Jacquemoud, a deputy and poet from Tarentaise, who in 1848 expressed a similar sentiment in a hymn that later became associated with the aphorism of the pro-annexationists:

Ah! This sister who is dear to us
With all our wishes we call her.
Our hearts go where our Isère goes
And the inclination of our valleys

— Antoine Jacquemoud, Montagnards de Tarentaise, 1848

This maxim will indeed reappear during the debates on the annexation of Savoy to France between 1859 and 1860, in the form: “Our hearts go where our rivers flow.”

In contrast, the future minister Albert Blanc, an opponent of annexation, published a pamphlet in 1859 entitled Savoy and the Constitutional Monarchy. In it, he stated that “The Savoyards who are stirring seek the Republic or the Empire, but not France,” expressing concern that Savoy would be subsumed within the French centralized state.

=== Nationalism from 1860 to 1960 ===
The incorporation of Savoy into the French Empire was confirmed through a nearly unanimous plebiscite, although the conditions under which it was conducted were subject to some criticism. (Note: For this period, see the article History of Savoy from 1860 to 1914. One of the reference works remains the thesis by Lovie, Jacques (1963). La Savoie dans la vie française [Savoy in French life] (Thesis) (in French). Paris: Presses universitaires de France.) Savoyards received certain concessions, including a large free zone, the retention of the name “Savoy” for the two new departments, and the preservation of the Court of Appeal of Chambéry as well as the dioceses of Tarentaise and Maurienne. Despite these advantages, many Savoyards were soon disillusioned, though the plebiscite itself was not formally contested. (Note: For this period, see the section 1861–1871, “discontent without questioning the plebiscite, in the article History of Savoy from 1860 to 1914.)

The end of the Second Empire was a period marked by criticism of the events of 1860. The idea of decentralization was widely supported by local elected officials. The fall of Thiers in 1873 did not alter this dynamic. The appointment of the Savoyard Jules Philippe as head of the prefecture of Haute-Savoie in 1870 was initially well received; however, after falling into disfavor, he was transferred to Perpignan, from where he eventually resigned. Jacques Lovie cites the report of the sub-prefect of Saint-Julien-en-Genevois dated 8 June 1874, which stated: “We have around us a permanent conspiracy against everything that is French. The Savoyards support one another… All are in agreement, from the first to the last; let the government know this well; if it wishes to overcome this country, if it wishes to assimilate it, it must replace the Savoyard officials and retain those French officials who have enough energy to resist.”

The prefect Peloux, who succeeded Philippe, described the political situation in Haute-Savoie, noting that local interests often guided political attitudes. He observed that Savoyards were characterized by a strong sense of autonomy and a cautious, pragmatic approach, evaluating what was beneficial for the province. According to Peloux, the attachment of the region to France was closely linked to the advantages it could derive from the relationship.

He carried out a reorganization of the political personnel and the departmental administration. Some Savoyard republicans, concerned about a potential monarchical restoration, had briefly considered a union with Switzerland. However, the Wallon amendment of 30 January 1875, which confirmed the establishment of the Republic, alleviated these concerns. Subsequently, the First World War further reinforced the integration of Savoyards into the French nation.

The Jeunesses fédéralistes savoyardes (JFS) are considered the first Savoyard regionalist movement. They were reportedly established in 1925 by Paul Gay, a medical student from Saint-Jeoire-en-Faucigny studying in Lyon. The movement emphasized attachment to the local territory, patois, religion, and France. An advertisement for the League of Federalist Youths on the back of the only printed brochure suggests a possible affiliation with the party of Charles Maurras. The movement was short-lived, disappearing within the same year. Following the JFS, Paul Gay, together with Jean Dunoyer and later Constant Rey-Millet, launched the monthly Savoyard art and literature journal Le Taudis, published from 1925 to 1928. In its first issue, Paul Gay cited Paul Claudel: “Anyone who engages in politics among us gets his nose blackened with the bottom of the frying pan.”

Under the Vichy regime, Savoyard nationalism was expressed through the publication of the journal Revue de Savoie, which operated within the framework of the government in place. The first article, written by Commander Émile Gaillard, described the concept of a “Savoy region” based on four criteria: geographical unity, affirmation of history, economic self-sufficiency, cultural uniformity, and the “homogeneity of the population.” These themes correspond closely to those later emphasized by regionalist movements, with the exception of the population criterion. The journal was published from 1941 until shortly after the end of the war, after which it was renamed Cahiers de Savoie and continued until 1947. Following a period of inactivity, it resumed publication in 1954 with a more regionalist orientation:

Would we be naïve enough to think that regionalism carries within it the effective virtues of a panacea? Centralization, from which our country, for several centuries, has been both the beneficiary and the victim (...). Why, moreover, discuss regionalism? It is enough for us that the region exists in fact and in the nature of things.

— Preface, pp. 3–4

The journal ceased publication with a special issue on the occasion of the Centenary of the Annexation.

=== Nationalism in the 1960s ===
==== Politicization of Savoyard nationalism and restructuring of local elites ====
From the 1960s onward, Savoyard nationalism underwent a transformation. Historians note a significant shift in the 1950s, associated with economic growth, social changes, and demographic and cultural mixing following the decline of the rural world. During this period, Savoyard nationalism moved beyond its earlier cultural focus and became more politicized, although it remained centered among certain local elites. This development was influenced by the centenary celebrations of the Annexation in 1960. From 26 to 28 March of that year, the mayors of Savoy attended the commemorations in Paris and were received by Prime Minister Michel Debré, who stated that Savoy should express gratitude to France for its acceptance, a remark noted for its lack of tact.

On 29 September 1965, several local figures—the former deputy from Chablais, Dr. Yves-Marie Sautier; the writer Henry Planche; Guy Saultier; and the director of an agricultural cooperative, Paul Reboton—founded the Club des Savoyards de Savoie. Membership in the organization was restricted to individuals who could demonstrate Savoyard ancestry predating the Annexation, typically over five generations. The movement aimed to promote and defend the “Savoyard personality” while maintaining membership within the French national framework, (Note: Thus, in their brochure, one finds the following expression: “we feel loyally associated with them.” H. Planche, cited work.) and it also supported the idea of a more federal France. The network, which included around one thousand members, was connected to various Savoyard learned societies, sharing similar cultural and historical interests. Some members, such as Abbé Marius Hudry, who served as president until 1974, also held positions in these societies, including membership in the Académie de Savoie and as perpetual secretary of the Académie de la Val d’Isère.

Internal tensions between the founders and the Chablais delegation regarding the admission of new members led to a split in 1969, resulting in the formation of the Cercle de l’Annonciade by Paul Reboton, which primarily brought together members of the original leadership.

==== From identity claims to regionalist political organization ====
In 1968, Henri Dénarié, a former member of the International Brigades, founded Savoie Libre and distributed a limited number of leaflets. Despite its informal nature, the movement contributed to several initiatives, including the establishment of a Savoyard national holiday on 19 February 1972, (Note: This date was chosen with reference to the elevation of the County of Savoy to a duchy on 14 February 1416. See the detailed article History of Savoy in the Middle Ages.) the proposal to display the Savoy flag on town hall pediments in 1973, the renewed use of the demonym “Savoisien” for the inhabitants of Savoy, and discussions regarding the relevance of the Treaty of Turin of 1860.

The Savoie Libre movement represented a shift in Savoyard nationalism from intellectual discussion to identity-based advocacy. Several other small and largely short-lived movements also emerged, including Free and Federal European Savoy (SELF), founded by Pierre Ratinaud, the Savoyard Regionalist Rally, and the Savoyard Union of Regionalist Associations of Savoy.

During discussions on the creation of regions and subsequent decentralization, some Savoyards viewed the process as an opportunity to establish a political unit reflecting cultural unity. In July 1972, two cultural associations merged to form the Savoy Region Movement (MRS), which served as a political platform advocating for the unification of the two Savoy departments. The creation of the MRS led to debates within both Savoy departmental councils over the establishment of a Savoy region separate from Rhône-Alpes, and a petition supporting this initiative gathered more than 100,000 signatures. The regional project was not realized, as the general councillors of the department of Savoie opposed the union. However, the two departmental councils subsequently established the interdepartmental structure Entente régionale de Savoie in 1983 to manage shared institutions such as the University of Savoy, the Orchestra of the Pays de Savoie, the Heritage Guides of the Pays de Savoie, and the Maison de Savoie in Paris. Despite participation in regional and European elections, the movement gradually lost momentum.

==== Fragmentation of movements and incomplete institutionalization of claims ====
On 19 February 1986, Paul Reboton of the Cercle de l’Annonciade, Henri Dénarié of Savoie Libre, and Pierre Ratinaud of SELF met to establish the Consultative Council of the States of Savoy, which later evolved in 1997 into the Constitutional Council for the States of Savoy. Most of these movements, except for the Cercle de l’Annonciade, ceased to exist following the creation of the Ligue savoisienne. In the same year, Mouvement Savoie, founded by Maurice Martinet, a former member of the MRS and the National Front, was established with the slogan “Savoyards first, French always” and fielded candidates in various elections. Following the limited success of decentralization initiatives, identity and cultural claims increasingly became a focus of political activity.

In 1989, Michel Barnier, a former supporter of the MRS, deputy for Savoy and president of the General Council of Savoie, proposed merging the two Savoyard departments into a “super-department” as part of a broader plan to reduce the number of departments in France. Bernard Pellarin, president of the General Council of Haute-Savoie, opposed the proposal, noting that the department’s economic activity was more closely linked to the Geneva region than to the southern part of the former duchy.

=== Nationalism since the 1990s ===
==== From European regionalism to asserting sovereignty ====
A few years after the Albertville Olympic Games, discussions about the future of Savoy continued among regional movements. On 4 June 1994, Les Savoyards de Savoie, the MRS, and the Centre de la culture savoyarde met in Albertville at a forum titled “What Future for Savoy in Europe?”, influenced by the ideas of Denis de Rougemont. The discussions addressed the recurring issues of regional fragmentation versus unity and explored the concept of a cross-border Alpine region within a European framework, partly reflecting the historical extent of the former States of Savoy. (Note: Proceedings of the Savoyard Forum, 1994, transcript of the debate “Savoy, toward fragmentation or unity?” with members of the Région Savoie movement, p. 59, and the intervention of the Swiss journalist Adolphe Ribordy, “Toward a transnational region in the Northern Alps?”, p. 61.)

In this context, activist Jean de Pingon, (Note: Jean de Pingon, born on 7 January 1952, is a writer and historian of French and Swiss nationality, founder of the Savoyard League. His novel about the mythical king Bérold won the Grand Book Prize awarded by the Tribune de Genève at the Geneva Book Fair in 1988. The publisher Buchet-Chastel later reissued this novel.) dissatisfied with the MRS, left the movement and published articles in Le Faucigny and Présence savoisienne, the journal of the Annonciade, advocating for a future in which Savoy could become a sovereign state. In 1994, an appeal by de Pingon in Le Faucigny led to the creation of a new movement, the Ligue savoisienne. The movement’s discourse emphasized the alleged non-respect of the Treaty of Turin, historical continuity, and economic arguments suggesting that Savoy could sustain itself independently, while maintaining a legalistic approach rejecting violence. The Ligue savoisienne quickly became prominent among Savoyard nationalist movements, advocating for a sovereign and independent Savoy. It held its first congress on 26 May 1996 in Albertville and officially entered the political arena by participating in the 1998 regional and cantonal elections, securing a seat on the Rhône-Alpes regional council, held by Patrice Abeille for Haute-Savoie, (Note: The “Savoyard Renaissance” list, led by Patrice Abeille in Haute-Savoie, obtained more than 5% of the votes cast and therefore a seat as a regional councillor for its lead candidate. The list for the Department of Savoy obtained slightly more than 4%.) whose vote proved decisive in forming a majority.

==== Fragmentation of movements and partial institutionalization of demands ====
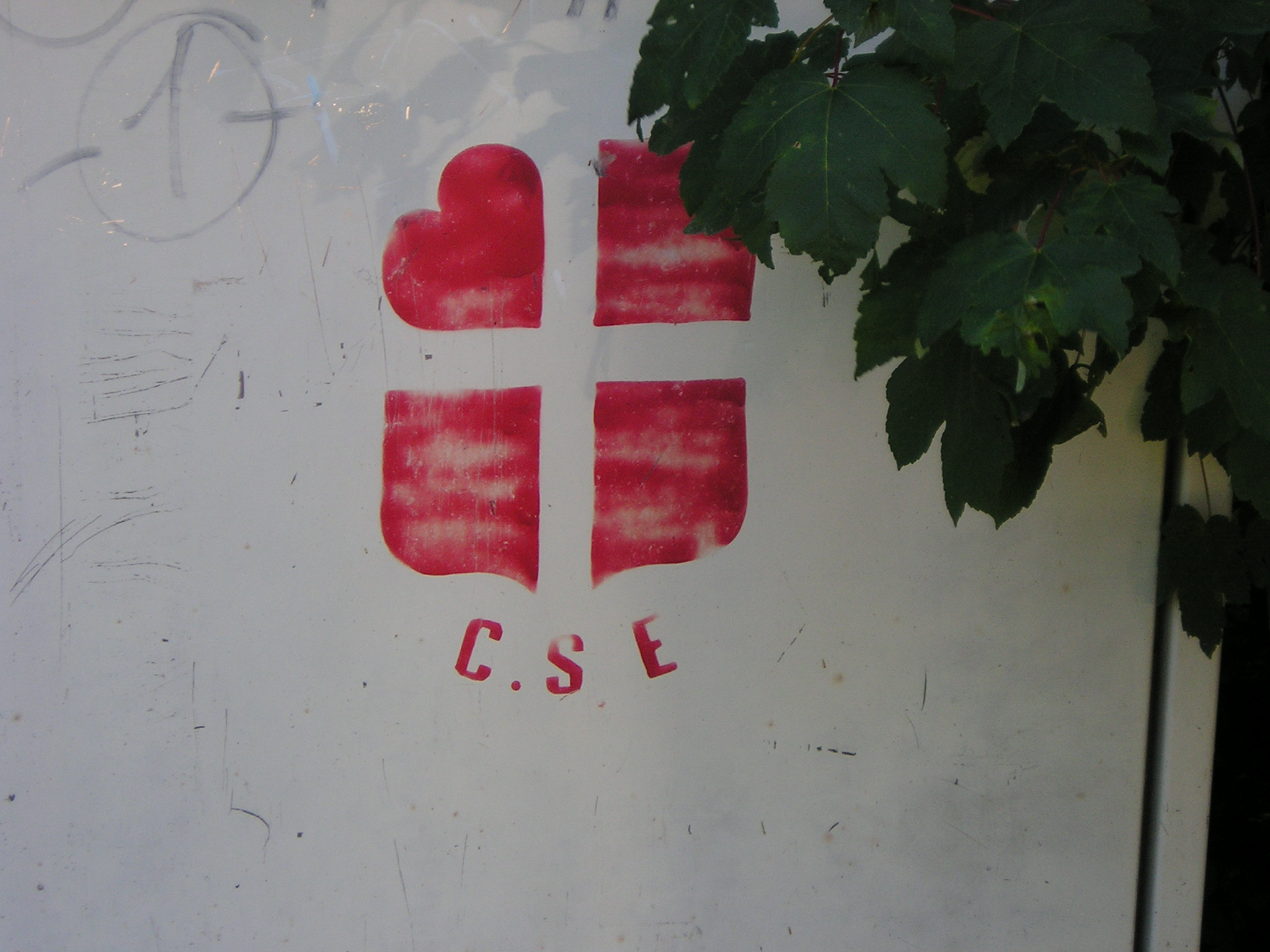
Logo of the Savoy Confederation.

The institutionalization of the Ligue savoisienne, combined with shifts toward ethnic nationalism and the recognition of a more moderate regionalism within the Savoyard political sphere through the Assemblée des Pays de Savoie, led to internal splits. This resulted in the creation of smaller movements, including the Rassemblement des Savoisiens, which presented candidates in the 1997 legislative elections, and the Savoy Confederation, which maintained a more radical stance. Following the establishment of the Ligue savoisienne, the number of cultural, historical, and Francoprovençal language associations increased, as did the use of the term savoisien in businesses and brand names.

In the 2000s, regionalist and independence-oriented discourse declined in the local political landscape. Some individuals joined the Federalist Party. The idea of a Savoy region, briefly supported by the independence movement, renewed debate within Savoyard political institutions. Regional councillors and members of parliament occasionally referenced this demand in their statements. A committee, La Région Savoie, j’y crois ! (1998), gathered its supporters. The question of a political status for the Pays de Savoie became an electoral topic, with figures such as Hervé Gaymard, a former minister and member of the MRS, advocating for a Council of the Pays de Savoie that would merge the departments and exercise regional powers, making this proposal one of his priorities during the June 2007 legislative campaign.

One consequence of this regionalist movement was the transformation of the Entente régionale de Savoie into the Assemblée des Pays de Savoie (Note: The statutes were filed in April 2007 and the premises were inaugurated on 24 November of the same year, in Ugine, according to information published on the website of the Journal officiel de la République française.) on 14 February 2001 in Tamié. This institution represents a notable case of interdepartmental cooperation in France.

The electoral alliance between the Ligue savoisienne and the MRS, formalized in 2007 with the creation of the Savoie Europe Liberté movement, ended in 2009, when the MRS decided to return to its autonomist orientation by forming an alliance with Europe Ecology.

The association La Région Savoie, j’y crois ! is an autonomist movement founded in 1998, following the submission of a legislative proposal by deputies Michel Bouvard and Bernard Bosson aimed at creating a Savoy region composed of the departments of Savoie and Haute-Savoie, as well as the publication of the book Région Savoie, Pourquoi – Comment by Claude Barbier and Benoît Bro. The association published a White Paper on the creation of a Savoy region. Noël Communod, after a brief involvement with the Ligue savoisienne, (Note: Article by Abeille, Patrice (2006). "Un nouveau nid pour le coucou savoyard" [A new nest for the Savoyard cuckoo]. Le Savoisien (in French). Archived from the original on January 3, 2013.. Noël Communod also proposed to the movement a “Societal Project for a Sovereign Savoy,” a document of around twenty pages submitted to the movement’s bodies on 2 June 2002, in which he set out an action plan intended to culminate on 19 February 2004.) joined the La Région Savoie, j’y crois ! committee, of which he became president. In April 2006, he founded the Parti fédéraliste et régionaliste de Savoie (PFRS), affiliated with the Federalist Party, and authored a number of works on the subject. He left his position as secretary general of the PFRS in August 2008 to become a member of MoDem Savoie, where he subsequently became departmental vice-president. He became president of the MRS in January 2010 and, during the regional elections, was a candidate on the Europe Ecology list. Placed in fourth position, Noël Communod was elected regional councillor of Rhône-Alpes.

==== Marginalization, militant resurgence, and contemporary legacies ====
Although the debate over Savoyard independence has been less visible in recent years, independence activism has continued. On 12 June 2011, approximately 600 supporters gathered in Aix-les-Bains at the initiative of the Mouvement citoyen de Savoie (MCS), later renamed Mouvement citoyens de Savoie (MCSE), chaired by Jean Blanc, a shepherd from Maurienne and former member of the Ligue savoisienne. Blanc had previously been a candidate in legislative and senatorial elections for this movement and was involved with the Provisional Government of the State of Savoy. (Note: The Provisional Government of the State of Savoy appeared in December 2010 and was led by two former members of the Savoyard League. It appears to follow on from the movement Pour la Savoie (For Savoy), created by a former member and first president of the Savoyard League, Jean-François Péronnier, and by the lawyer Fabrice Bonnard, self-proclaimed bâtonnier of Savoy and Nice.) The 2011 meeting brought together these movements around a project for the creation of a “State of Savoy” and included the presentation of a proposed police force for this entity. In 2010, the two movements had previously gathered around 200 participants in Albertville, in collaboration with the Confédération savoisienne, for the “first international meeting of the State of Savoy,” during which the Provisional Government of the State of Savoy was presented and plans for administrative measures, including customs at the borders with France, were discussed. Éric Stauffer, president of the Geneva Citizens' Movement, was invited to the meeting.

At its 17th congress on 21 October 2012, the Ligue savoisienne decided to suspend its activities.

=== After the Ligue savoisienne ===
In the summer of 2014, during discussions on a bill concerning the delimitation of regions, regional and departmental elections, and the electoral calendar, Hervé Gaymard, deputy and president of the General Council of Savoie, supported by Christian Monteil, president of the General Council of Haute-Savoie, proposed an amendment to create a territorial collectivity of Savoie–Mont-Blanc. The amendment was rejected.

On 28 June 2014, during its 17th session in Munich, Germany, the Unrepresented Nations and Peoples Organization recognized the government of the State of Savoy as a member.

At the end of 2016, two new movements emerged. On 17 December, the Savoyan League was revived, referred to as the Canal Historique, and in the autumn, a political party identifying as 100% Savoy was established. This party presented candidates in the 2017 legislative elections, with one candidate, Daniel Magnin, mayor of Maxilly-sur-Léman, receiving 7.84% of the vote in the Fifth constituency of Haute-Savoie.

In October 2020, approximately fifty individuals associated with the Sovereign Senate of Savoy, founded in 2019, gathered at the military necropolis of Morette (Haute-Savoie) and proclaimed the creation of a sovereign State of Savoy, citing the assertion that the Treaty of 1860 had been repealed in 1940.

=== Renewal since the 2020s ===
In November 2020, Laurent Gruaz published the book What If Savoy Became Independent Again?, prefaced by Jean de Pingon, founder of the Savoyard League. The author, a journalist and historian, presents a political fiction scenario imagining a present-day Savoyard state led by a descendant of the former Royal House of Savoy, thereby establishing a symbolic continuity with the historic duchy. The book discusses potential political, economic, environmental, administrative, and social implications of such a hypothetical Principality of Savoy.

At the end of 2022, following the planned dissolution of the Savoie Mont Blanc Council (CSMB) by the Departmental Council of Haute-Savoie, Laurent Gruaz continued to advocate for a reunified Savoy. Together with Olivier Diebolt, a consultant with a background in historical sciences and economic intelligence, and François Ploton-Nicollet, a native of Savoy and lecturer in Latin language and literature at the École des chartes, he launched a petition calling for the merger of the departments of Savoie and Haute-Savoie into a single territorial authority. The petition was supported by the Savoy Region Movement (MRS)-Sabaudia, which established a support committee in Saint-Pierre-en-Faucigny on 30 April 2023. The initiative was motivated both by the dissolution of the CSMB and by a proposed territorial reform bill, postponed until 2024. Following this, the three collaborators drafted a bill to create a single territorial authority under Article 72 of the French Constitution for the two departments. The proposal was taken up by Haute-Savoie senator Loïc Hervé and supported by his Savoie colleague Martine Berthet, with the aim of influencing the debate on the administrative organization of Savoy.

The third component of their initiative took shape with the creation of the association Le Cercle de Savoie, which publishes the quarterly journal Les Cahiers du Cercle de Savoie, first issued in March 2024. The journal serves as a platform for residents of Savoie, including those identifying as autonomists, independentists, or simply living in the departments of Savoie and Haute-Savoie. The association emphasizes the idea of uniting the two Savoyard departments, citing concerns over their potential marginalization within larger metropolitan areas such as Lyon, Grenoble, and Geneva. Rémi Mogenet, a Savoyard agrégé and Doctor of Letters, participates on the journal’s editorial committee.

The association proposes initiatives aimed at strengthening ties between Savoy and its inhabitants. These include the creation of a university hospital center, the preservation of the Chambéry Court of Appeal, the revision of the treaty governing the Franco-Genevan compensation fund, measures addressing rising housing costs driven by cross-border workers, and the establishment of a free zone within a unified Savoyard authority. These proposals are intended to prevent the transformation of the border regions into mere "dormitory zones" or recreational areas.

The proponents argue that the primary objective is to eliminate the divide between Savoie and Haute-Savoie, restoring a unified territorial framework that respects the region's historical identity. This would enable Savoy to thrive through continued economic and cultural ties with its natural partners to the east, north of Lake Geneva, and to the west of the Rhône.

Drawing inspiration from the political mobilization seen in Alsace in 2015, they hope to see a similar “desire for Savoy” emerge in both departments.

== Current political movements ==
- Savoy Region Movement (MRS): a centrist regionalist movement, founded in 1972.
- Savoy Confederation (CSE): an independentist movement, founded in 2001 following a split from the Savoyard League.
- La Région Savoie, j’y crois !: a regionalist association founded in 1998. Transpartisan, it brings together elected officials in favor of creating a Savoy region.
- Gouvernement provisoire de l’État de Savoie (GPESE): an independentist movement, founded between 2008 and 2010.
- Mouvement Citoyens de Savoie (MCSE): an independentist political party, founded in 2011.
- 100% Savoie: a political party founded in 2016, advocating autonomy and respect for Savoy’s rights.
- Sovereign Senate of Savoy: founded in 2019, an independentist movement.

=== Independentist youth ===
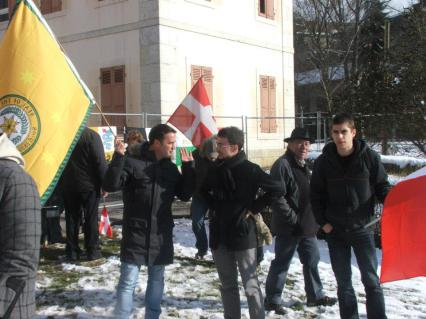
Young regionalists during a demonstration in Savoie

In certain educational institutions in the Savoy region, students can choose a Savoyard-focused option, such as at the Jean-Marie Molliet Middle School in Boëge and the Lycée des Glières in Annemasse, under the leadership of Marc Bron, former mayor of Habère-Lullin. However, the creation of this option has seen limited success, with low interest among high school students, particularly at the Lycée des Glières. Some students are reportedly enrolled in this option due to pressure from others wishing to preserve the region's linguistic traditions.

On 19 February 2021, a youth movement called Savoie Libre Jeune organized a demonstration to commemorate the Duchy of Savoy.

== The Swiss trend ==
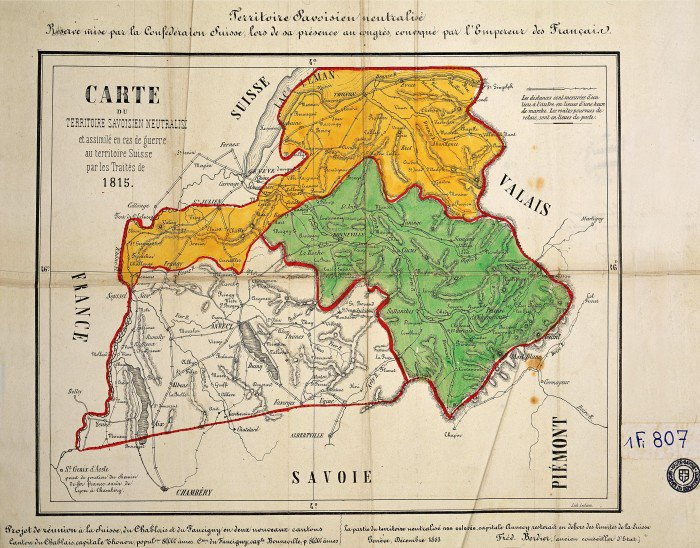
Plan for the union of Chablais and Faucigny with Switzerland, on a map of the neutralized Savoyard territory (assimilated into Switzerland in the event of war), 1863.

Throughout discussions on Savoy’s future, the possibility of integration with the neighboring Swiss Confederation has occasionally been raised.

During the debates over the Annexation of 1859–1860, this option was considered in several villages in the northern part of the Duchy of Savoy. A petition was reportedly circulated at that time, gathering over 13,000 signatures. (Note: This petition brought together more than 13,651 signatures in villages in the northern part (today Haute-Savoie): 60 municipalities in Faucigny, 23 in Savoyard Chablais, and 13 in the vicinity of Saint-Julien-en-Genevois, with the support of England.) The issue was ultimately set aside with the creation of a free zone in this area and the introduction of a “Yes and Free Zone” option during the plebiscite. (Note: The unanimity was almost total. The number of votes cast in the area concerned amounted to 47,774. These were supplemented by 232 “Yes” ballots, and only 132 “No” ballots and 35 invalid votes.) Contemporary commentary, such as in La Savoie du Nord, noted that by choosing this option, the local population effectively expressed their preferences regarding national affiliation.

In 1943, a French administrative agent from the cantons of Reignier and Annemasse observed that a plebiscite in the free zone, encompassing Chablais, Faucigny, and part of the Savoyard Genevois, would likely result in a majority favoring attachment to Switzerland. The reasons cited included Switzerland’s longstanding neutrality, a more flexible administration, a stable currency, and the economic, educational, and cultural advantages offered by proximity to Geneva.

In September 2008, a poll commissioned by the Mouvement Franche-Comté, led by Jean-Philippe Allenbach, examined the possibility of Franche-Comté and Savoy joining Switzerland. The survey indicated that 43.7% of Swiss respondents were somewhat favorable to such an attachment, compared with 37.6% who were opposed. When considering only French-speaking Switzerland, support increased to 55.9%, with 28.4% opposed. Members of the Savoyard League expressed interest in this scenario.

In 2010, a poll conducted by the German-language weekly Die Weltwoche indicated that 48% of respondents in both Savoyard departments were in favor of a possible attachment to Switzerland.

== Emblems and symbols ==
Savoy has its own emblems and symbols:

The flag of Savoy

- The flag reproduces the design of the coat of arms of the Dukes of Savoy, featuring a silver cross on a red field.
- The anthem: Les Allobroges, referring to the ancient Celtic people of the Allobroges, who settled in the lands of Savoy at the beginning of the 3rd century BC. This song, created in the 19th century, takes “freedom” as its theme, according to the lyrics of the Savoyard author Joseph Dessaix.

Allobroges vaillants ! Dans vos vertes campagnes
Accordez-moi toujours asile et sûreté
Car j'aime à respirer l'air pur de vos montagnes :
Je suis la Liberté ! la Liberté !

Valiant Allobroges! In your green countryside
Always grant me shelter and safety,
For I love to breathe the pure air of your mountains:
I am Freedom! Freedom!

- The national day of Savoy is observed on 19 February, commemorating the elevation of the County of Savoy to a duchy in 1416. This date has been associated with the development of Savoyard regional identity in the 20th century. In 1970, the Cercle de l’Annonciade promoted the observance of this date, and the Savoyard League organized commemorative events, including meals, in towns across the region.

== See also ==
- Savoy Region Movement
- Savoyan League
- Irredentism
- Italian irredentism in Savoy
- Franco-Provençal
- List of learned societies of Savoy

== Bibliography ==
=== General works ===
- Guichonnet, Paul (2007). Nouvelle encyclopédie de la Haute-Savoie : Hier et aujourd'hui [New Encyclopedia of Haute-Savoie: Yesterday and Today] (in French) (2nd ed.). Montmélian: La Fontaine de Siloé. ISBN 978-2-84206-374-0.
- Sorrel, Christian (2006). Histoire de la Savoie en images : images, récits [History of Savoy in pictures: images, stories]. Les Savoisiennes (in French). La Fontaine de Siloé. pp. 380–381. ISBN 2-84206-347-3.
- Mayeur, Jean-Marie; Sorrel, Christian; Hilaire, Yves-Marie (1996). La Savoie (Tome 8) [Savoy (Volume 8)] (in French). Paris: Beauchesne. ISBN 2-7010-1330-5.
- Palluel-Guillard, André (1986). La Savoie de Révolution française à nos jours, XIXe – XXe siècle [Savoy from the French Revolution to the present day, 19th–20th centuries] (in French). Ouest France Université. ISBN 2-85882-536-X.
- Lovie, Jacques (1967). La Savoie dans la vie française de 1860 à 1875 [Savoy in French life from 1860 to 1875] (in French). Paris: Presses universitaires de France.

=== Analysis of Savoyard regionalism ===
- Amoudry, Michel (2003). Quel avenir pour la Savoie ? [What does the future hold for Savoie?]. Espace et horizon (in French). Yens: Cabédita. ISBN 2-88295-368-2.
- Amoudry, Michel (2010). La Savoie, une destinée française : Pourquoi ? Comment ? [Savoy, a French destiny: Why? How?]. Espace et horizon (in French). Annecy: Éditions Le Vieil Annecy. ISBN 978-2-912008-38-1.
- Milbach, Sylvain (2008). L'éveil politique de la Savoie, 1848-1853 : conflits ordinaires et rivalités nouvelles [The political awakening of Savoy, 1848-1853: ordinary conflicts and new rivalries]. Histoire (in French). Rennes: Presses Universitaires de Rennes. ISBN 978-2-7535-0697-8.

=== Regionalist or related works ===
- Comité Région Savoie (2003). Livre blanc pour la création de la Région Savoie [White paper for the creation of the Savoie Region] (in French). Mirno-Graphie.
- Abeille, Patrice (1998). Renaissance savoisienne : Le Livre Blanc [Savoy Renaissance: The White Paper] (in French). Yens: Cabédita. ISBN 2-88295-218-X.
- Barbier, Claude; Bro, Benoît (1998). Région Savoie : Pourquoi ? Comment ? [Savoie region: Why? How?]. Regard et Connaissance (in French). Saint-Gingolph: Cabédita. ISBN 2-88295-241-4.
- Communod, Noël (2002). Décentralisation : La région Savoie en 2004, c'est possible ! [Decentralization: The Savoie region in 2004—it's possible!] (in French). Mirno-Graphie. ISBN 2-95183-581-7.
- Communod, Noël (2003). Livre blanc pour la création d'une région Savoie [White paper for the creation of a Savoie region] (in French). La Région Savoie j'y crois !.
- Communod, Noël (2005). Les germes d'une révolution régionale: Les leviers de l'autonomie régionale sont dans les mains des collectivités territoriales. Un exemple, celui des pays de Savoie [The seeds of a regional revolution: The levers of regional autonomy are in the hands of local authorities. One example is the Savoie region.] (in French). Mirno-Graphie. ISBN 2-95183-582-5.
- Communod, Noël (2005). L'affaire Gaymard: ce qu'elle révèle, ce qu'elle réveille [The Gaymard affair: what it reveals, what it reawakens] (in French). Mirno-Graphie. ISBN 2-95183-583-3.
- Communod, Noël (2006). Face au déclin : le choix d'une France fédérale, démocratique, pluraliste, flexible, solidaire : un système centralisé, une société bloquée, des partis dépassés [Facing decline: choosing a federal, democratic, pluralistic, flexible, and united France: a centralized system, a stagnant society, outdated parties] (in French). Mirno-Graphie. ISBN 2-95183-585-X.
- de Pingon, Jean (1996). Savoie française. L'histoire d'un pays annexé [French Savoy. The story of an annexed country]. Archives vivantes (in French). Yens-sur-Morges: Cabédita. ISBN 978-2-88295-184-7.
- Centre de la Culture Savoyarde de Conflans (1994). Quel avenir pour la Savoie en Europe ? (Actes du Forum savoyard) [What future for Savoy in Europe? (Proceedings of the Savoy Forum)] (in French). Center for Savoyard Culture in Conflans.
- Devouassoux, Christophe; Labevière, Richard (1992). Duel au sommet. La montagne à l'épreuve de la démocratie [Clash at the summit. The mountain put to the test of democracy] (in French). Paris: Syros Alternatives. p. 189.
- Savoy Region Movement (1973). Livre Blanc et Rouge : Pour une Région Savoie [White and Red Paper: For a Savoie Region] (in French).

=== More general analyses including an article on Savoy ===
- de Winter, Lieven; Gómez-Reino Cachafeiro, Margarita (2006). Autonomist Parties in Europe. Identity Politics and the Revival of the Territorial Cleavage. Vol. 2. Barcelona: Institut de Ciències Polítiques i Socials. p. 557. ISBN 978-84-608-0451-2.
- Chartier, Erwan; Larvor, Ronan; Louarn, Malo (2004). La France éclatée ? : enquête sur les mouvements régionalistes, autonomistes et indépendantistes en France [France fragmented? An investigation into regionalist, autonomist, and separatist movements in France] (in French). Coop Breizh. ISBN 978-2-84346-203-0.
- Ihl, Olivier (2003). La Tentation populiste au cœur de l'Europe [The populist temptation at the heart of Europe]. Recherches (in French). Paris: La Découverte. ISBN 978-2-7071-3987-0.
- Gras, Christian; Livet, Georges (1977). "Essai sur le régionalisme savoyard (1860-1974)" [Essay on Savoyard regionalism (1860-1974)]. Régions et régionalisme en France du XVIIIe siècle à nos jours [Regions and regionalism in France from the 18th century to the present day] (in French). Paris: PUF.
