= Savoyan League =

Savoyan League Ligue savoisienne (French) Liga de la Savouè (Arpitan)
- Founded: 1995
- Headquarters: 3, place du Val d'Arly; 73400 Ugine
- Ideology: Regionalism; Separatism; Populism
- Colors: white, red

The Savoyan League (French: Ligue savoisienne, Arpitan: Liga de la Savouè) was a regionalist and populist political party based in Savoy, France.

Founded in 1995, the party supported the independence of Savoy from France and the unification of the two departments of Savoy, named Savoie and Haute-Savoie, which have belonged to France since the Treaty of Turin in 1860. Formerly a member of the European Free Alliance, the party was generally pro-European in outlook, while lying on the right of the political spectrum. The League co-operated with the Savoy Region Movement, which does not support independence but rather federalism and Savoyard autonomism.

In the 1998 regional elections, the League won 5.39% in Savoy (4.42% in Savoie and 6.05% in Haute-Savoie) and therefore won a seat in the Rhône-Alpes Regional Council. It did not participate in the 2004 regional elections.

At the party's 17th Congress on 21 October 2012, the Savoyan League suspended its activities, it was reactivated on 1 August 2025.

== See also ==
- Savoyard nationalism
