= Les Allobroges =

Les Allobroges, also known as the Chant des Allobroges, is the anthem of Savoie. Its original title was La Liberté. The name refers to the ancient Celtic people of the Allobroges, who inhabited the lands of Savoy in antiquity.

== History ==
The song takes liberty as its central theme. Its words were written by the Savoyard author Joseph Dessaix, who gave his cantata the title La Liberté.

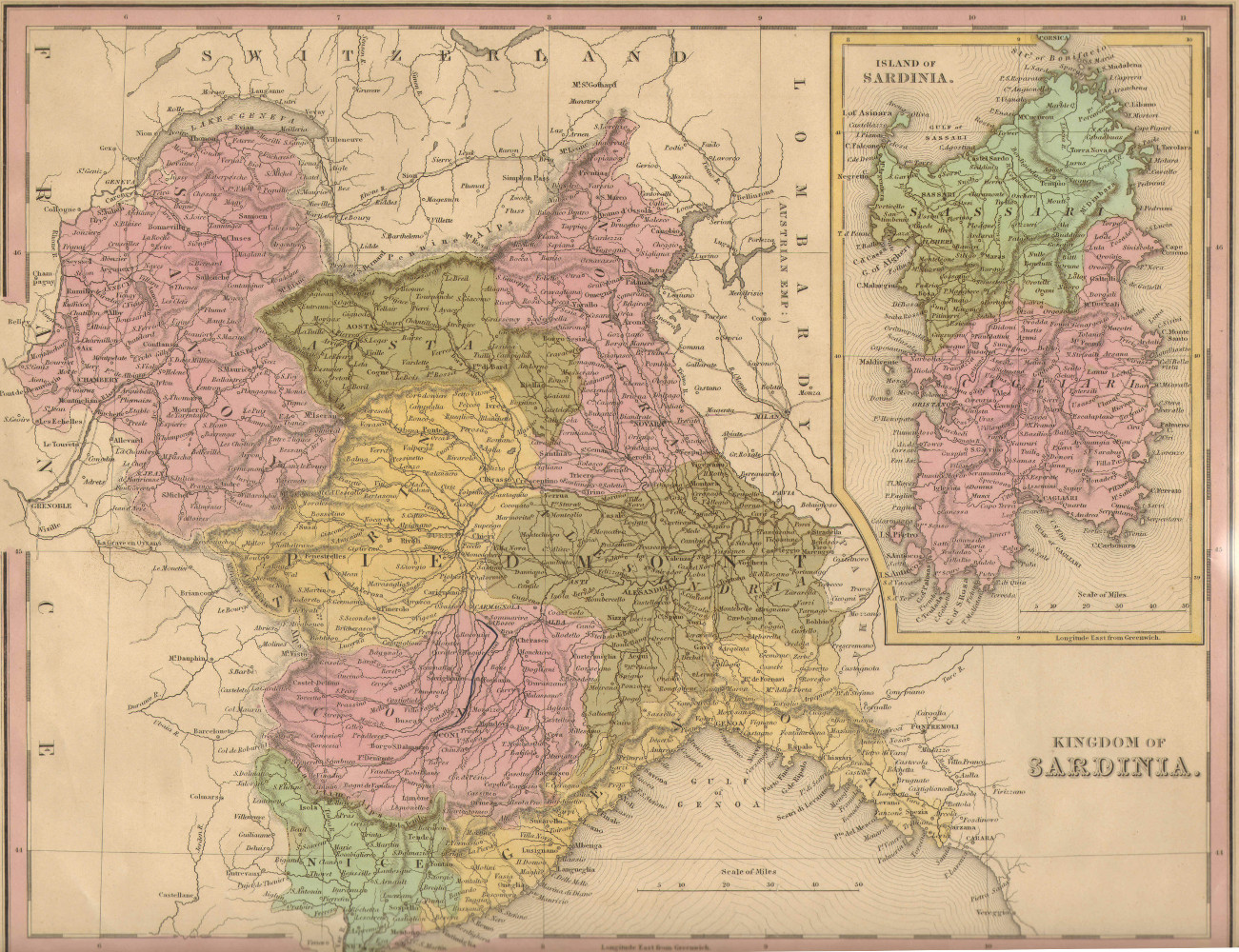
The ten provinces of the Kingdom of Sardinia in 1839, including Savoy.

It was first performed under the title La Liberté at the theatre of Chambéry, then in the Kingdom of Sardinia, by Clarisse Midroy on 11 May 1856, during the festival of the Statute held in honour of the constitutional statute of 1848. The music is attributed to a musician named Conterno or Consterno, the bandmaster of a Sardinian military contingent returning from the Crimean War and staying in Chambéry.

In the song, liberty is personified as a living allegory, driven out of France and taking refuge in the mountains of Savoy. There, it receives the support of the Allobroges, who are presented as giving moral aid to all peoples aspiring to freedom. The hymn refers to the refuge offered in the Duchy of Savoy to people proscribed after the 1851 French coup d'état of Louis-Napoléon Bonaparte, including Eugène Sue, Alexandre Dumas and Victor Schœlcher.

The song quickly became popular throughout the Duchy of Savoy, as well as in Geneva and Lausanne. It became better known as the Chant des Allobroges and came to be regarded as the anthem of the Savoyards.

== Lyrics ==
The original version written by Joseph Dessaix consisted of three couplets and a refrain, published at Chambéry on 7 June 1856.

Les Allobroges

Je te salue, ô terre hospitalière,
Où le malheur trouva protection ;
D'un peuple libre arborant la bannière,
Je viens fêter la Constitution.
Proscrite, hélas ! j'ai dû quitter la France,
Pour m'abriter sous un climat plus doux
Mais au foyer, j'ai laissé l'espérance
En attendant (bis), je m'arrête chez vous !

Refrain:
Allobroges vaillants ! Dans vos vertes campagnes,
Accordez-moi toujours asile et sûreté,
Car j'aime à respirer l'air pur de vos montagnes,
Je suis la Liberté ! la Liberté !

Au cri d'appel des peuples en alarmes,
J'ai répondu par un cri de réveil ;
Sourds à ma voix, ces esclaves sans armes
Restèrent tous dans un profond sommeil.
Relève-toi, ma Pologne héroïque !
Car, pour t'aider, je m'avance à grands pas ;
Secoue enfin ton sommeil léthargique,
Et, je le veux (bis), tu ne périras pas !

Refrain

Un mot d'espoir à la belle Italie ;
Courage à vous, Lombards, je reviendrai !
Un mot d'amour au peuple de Hongrie !
Forte avec tous, et je triompherai.
En attendant le jour de délivrance,
Priant les dieux d'apaiser leur courroux,
Pour faire luire un rayon d'espérance.
Bons Savoisiens (bis), je resterai chez vous !

Refrain

== See also ==
- Allobroges
- History of Savoy
- Savoy
- Savoyard Nationalism
