= History of Savoy from 1815 to 1860 =

From 1815 to 1860, the history of Savoy began with Napoleon’s defeat at Waterloo and the Treaty of Paris on November 20, 1815, restoring the Duchy of Savoy to the House of Savoy after 23 years of revolutionary and Napoleonic rule. This restoration, however, deepened the divide between the Savoyard population and the authoritarian monarchy, as the House of Savoy’s efforts to unify the Italian Peninsula conflicted with local concerns, making Savoyards feel marginalized within an Italophone entity.

Cultural ties with France grew, particularly through the First Empire’s army (1814), with 18 lieutenant generals, 800 officers, and 25,000 Savoyard soldiers among 300,000 troops. The divide widened in the 1840s as the House of Savoy pursued expansionist policies aligned with the Italian Risorgimento. The separation was finalized by the Treaty of Turin in 1860, ceding Savoy to France in exchange for military support that helped the House of Savoy defeat the Austrian Empire, enabling the creation of the Kingdom of Italy, which it ruled.

== Victor Emmanuel I of Sardinia (1802–1821) and the buon governo ==
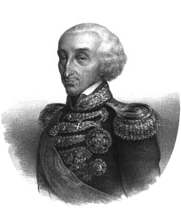
Victor Emmanuel I of Sardinia (1759–1824).

The Duchy of Savoy was restored to the Kingdom of Sardinia by the Treaty of Paris in 1815. King Victor Emmanuel I sought to establish an authoritarian monarchy but abdicated in 1821, unwilling to grant a constitution amid early signs of insurrection.

=== The reorganization of the duchy ===
Division of Savoy after the Treaty of Paris on May 30, 1814.

The Treaty of Paris of May 30, 1814, restored only part of the Duchy of Savoy to the King of Sardinia. Article 2 retained France’s pre-war borders, but Articles 7 and 8 allowed French control over most of Savoie Propre, including Chambéry (the capital), and the Genevois region with Annecy, as the Department of Mont-Blanc. (Note: The parts that remain part of France are the cantons of Frangy, Saint-Julien (except for a few communes), Reignier, and La Roche. The Chambéry arrondissement, except for the cantons of Hôpital-Conflans, Saint-Pierre-d'Albigny, La Rochette, and Montmélian. Finally, the Annecy arrondissement, except for part of the Faverges canton. Read also the treaty on Gallica from the National Library of France.) The returned portion, titled the Duchy of Savoy, was governed from Conflans, renamed Albertville in 1835 after merging with L’Hôpital-sous-Conflans, with a governor, general intendant, and a reduced seven-member Senate of Savoy. Joseph de Maistre deemed this division of the Savoyard population “intolerable.”

The Treaty of Paris of November 20, 1815, restored Savoy’s unity, though some communes were ceded to the Canton of Geneva. The Duchy of Savoy reorganized, with Chambéry reinstated as the capital, hosting administrative services, and a new provincial territorial structure was established.

Province	Chief Town	Districts	Communes	Changes
Savoie Propre	Chambéry (capital of the duchy)	12 – Aix; Chambéry; Chamoux; Châtelard; Échelles; Montmélian; La Motte-Servolex; Pont-de-Beauvoisin; La Rochette; Saint-Genix; Saint-Pierre-d'Albigny; Yenne	142	In 1818, addition of the district of Ruffieux.
Chablais	Thonon	6 – Abondance; Biot; Bons; Douvaine; Evian; Thonon	58	In 1818, the district of Bons was eliminated.
Faucigny	Bonneville	9 – Bonneville; Chamonix; Cluses; Megève; La Roche; Saint-Jeoire; Sallanches; Samoëns; Taninges	69	In 1818, the district of Megève was removed and the district of Saint-Gervais was created.
Genevois	Annecy	6 – Annecy; Duingt; Faverges; Talloires; Thônes; Thorens-Sales	74	In 1818, the district of Talloires disappeared; the districts of Rumilly and Albens were merged.
Haute-Savoie	Conflans then Albertville	4 – Beaufort; Conflans; Grésy; Ugines	41	Created in January 1816.
Maurienne	Saint-Jean-de-Maurienne	7 – Aiguebelle; La Chambre; Lanslebourg; Modane; Saint-Étienne-de-Cuines; Saint-Jean-de-Maurienne; Saint-Michel	69	In 1818, the district of Saint-Étienne was eliminated.
Rumilly	Rumilly	4 – La Biolle; Ruffieux; Rumilly; Seyssel	60	Created in December 1816. Suppressed in 1818 and divided among the provinces of Savoie Propre, Genevois, and Carouge.
Tarentaise	Moûtiers	5 – Bourg-Saint-Maurice; Bozel; Moûtiers; Sainte-Foy; Saint-Jean-de-Belleville	56	In 1818, the district of Sainte-Foy was eliminated.
Carouge	Saint-Julien	3 – Annemasse; Reigner; Saint-Julien	58	The first province disappeared with the Treaty of Turin in 1816, with the annexation of 24 communes to Switzerland, allowing for the creation of the Canton of Geneva. In 1818, the district of Seyssel was attached.
Provinces of the Duchy of Savoy

=== An authoritarian regime ===
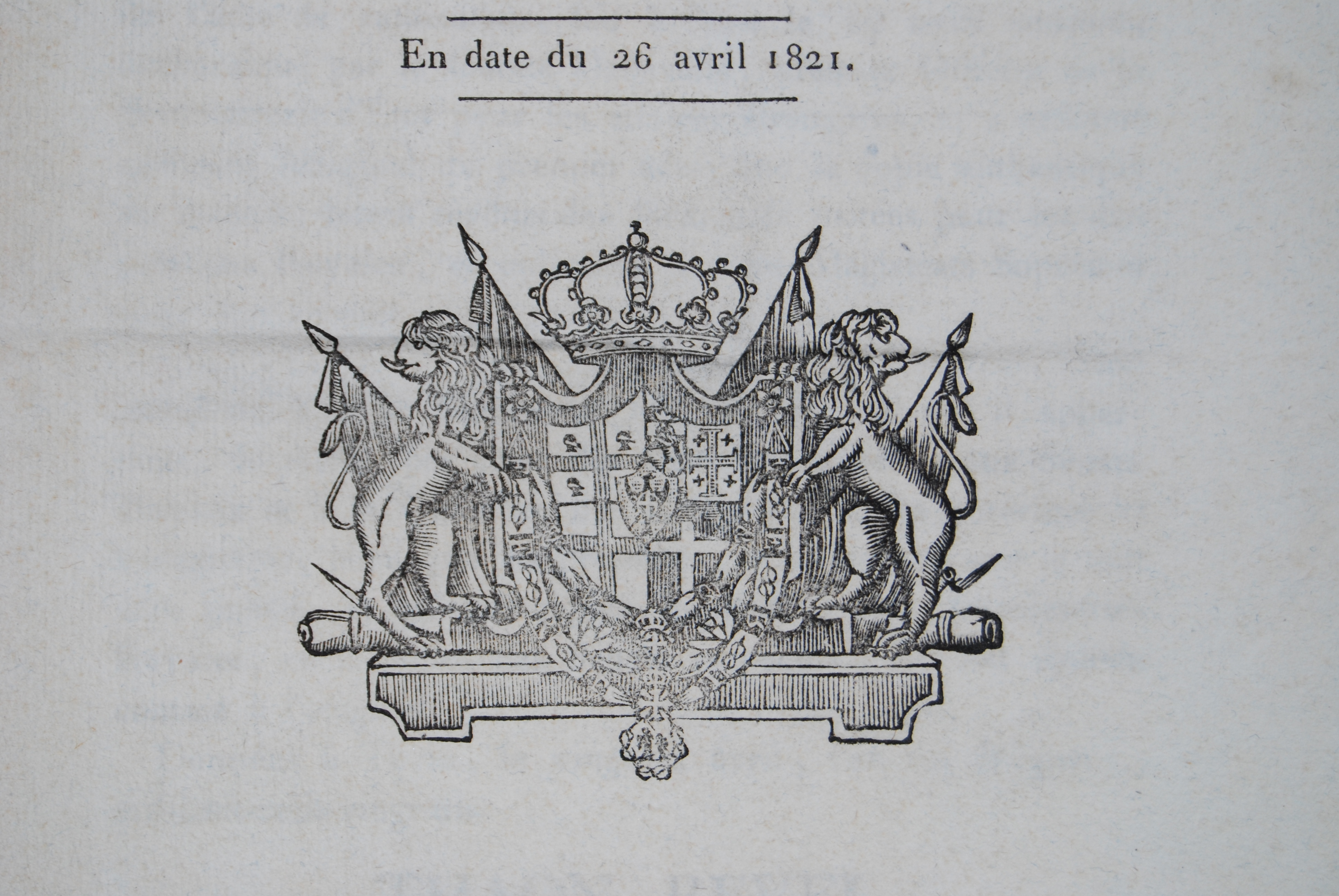
The coat of arms of the Kingdom of Sardinia (1821).

Victor Emmanuel I of Sardinia sought to establish a class-based society in Savoy, emphasizing expanded police powers. The nobility and wealthy business families, holding public, legislative, or administrative roles, formed the upper class, while the middle class accessed military, legal, medical, and academic professions, and the lower class was relegated to manual labor.

On January 5, 1815, the Royal Carabinieri were tasked with targeting individuals deemed societal threats, amid a significant beggar population. Military commanders and majors held monopolistic police power, administering summary justice without trials, which Joseph de Maistre criticized as the “tyranny of the Piedmontese town majors.” (Note: Citation from a letter by Joseph de Maistre to his king: "Give us whoever you want, even the Sophi of Persia (the title held by the ruler of Persia), but deliver us from the tyranny of the Piedmontese place majors!")

This vigilant organization of a society focused on good morals and a communal peace based on force and police intimidation was mockingly nicknamed by the Savoyards: Il buon Governo. The Savoyard bourgeoisie found this regime disconnected from public affairs and overly devoted to defending the throne’s interests. Moreover, the only sources of critical information have come from France or Geneva.

The Catholic, Apostolic, and Roman religion was declared the official religion of the Kingdom of Sardinia, with other religions tolerated. (Note: The Constitution of the Kingdom of Sardinia, known as the Albertine Statute, dated March 4, 1848, states in Article One: "The Catholic, Apostolic, and Roman religion is the only religion of the State. Other religions currently existing are tolerated according to the laws." Consult the 1848 Constitution on the website of the Digithèque of legal and political materials - University of Perpignan. This article was later incorporated into the Lateran Pacts, signed at the Lateran Palace on February 11, 1929, between the representative of Italy, Benito Mussolini, and the representative of the Holy See, Cardinal Pietro Gasparri, Cardinal Secretary of State for Pope Pius XI.)

Despite the clergy's property and rights being confiscated in December 1792, (Note: The French revolutionary armies invaded Savoy on the night of September 21–22, 1792.) it regained influence under the new regime. Priests, managing civil registers and communal schools, incorporated religious instruction and Italian-language reading and writing into school curricula. The restoration of state Catholicism led to the reconstruction of religious heritage destroyed during the Revolution, with 130 Sardinian neoclassicalchurches built, often called “the last great Savoyard architectural trend.” (Note: According to the title of an article by Marius Hudry and Jean-Marc Ferley, published in 1985 in the Revue savoisienne of the Société savoisienne d'histoire et d'archéologie.)

The liberal Carbonari, a secret republican society seeking democratic governance, resisted the policies of the Kingdom of Sardinia and acted in Piedmont and Savoy in March 1821. Austria, called upon by the kingdom, suppressed the insurrection, with many agitators, including officers, non-commissioned officers, and Carbonari parliamentarians, sentenced to death. The majority of the population remained passive, and government policies persisted unchanged. However, Carbonari activism led King Victor Emmanuel I to abdicate in 1821, succeeded by his brother, Charles Felix.

=== Laws and judges ===
The Laws and Constitutions of His Majesty the King of Sardinia, in §15, Book 3, Letter 2, mandated that magistrates and senators uphold the kingdom’s Laws, constitutions, and local articles in their decisions. Laws and ordinances, written in Italian, were translated into French for publication in the Duchy of Savoy.

==== Judiciary ====
Senate: The Senate of Savoy, the highest authority after the king, tried high-ranking officials and executed the prince’s will, with its seat in Chambéry. Comprising two chambers—the Court of Auditors and the Court of Appeals, which reported to the king in civil matters—it was established by Emmanuel Philibert of Savoy after abolishing the States General.[1] Magistrates, appointed by the king and led by a president titled “Excellency,” validated royal edicts, letters patent, and writs of the House of Savoy. Senate rulings were final and must be executed within 24 hours.

Courts: In each capital of Savoy’s eight provinces, a court of “judicature mage,” established in 1823, consisted of two magistrate judges and a president. It handled civil cases valued over 300 francs and provincial appeals, with appeals of its judgments allowed only for cases exceeding 1,000 francs. Before 1823, the court had a single judge, and the mortgage system for property rights and land ownership was introduced that year.

Conciliations: For disputes below the monetary threshold, the local castellan resolved all conflicts among inhabitants in the Duchy of Savoy.

==== Death sentences ====
By Senate decree, a condemned person, notified of their sentence by the criminal court clerk, was handed to the executioner. The public could observe the condemned, chained to a stool in prison for 24 hours. On execution day, city bells signalled the condemned’s procession to the gallows, accompanied by penitents and a priest singing psalms, with the hangman holding the rope around their neck for public hanging.

==== Sentences to the galleys ====
A person sentenced to the galleys was brought to the execution square to observe the punishment, then paraded through the city carrying a boat oar on their shoulders, symbolizing the sentence, under judicial soldiers’ watch and accompanied by tolling bells. They remained chained until sent to the galleys.

=== Return to the roots ===
After the restoration of the States of Savoy, local elites established scholarly societies to promote regional identity within the Kingdom of Sardinia. In 1819, the Académie de Savoie (Academy of Sciences, Literature, and Arts of Savoy) was founded in the Duchy of Savoy, modeled on the Academy of Turin, by Cardinal Alexis Billiet, General Count François de Mouxy de Loche, Senator Count Xavier de Vignet, and Knight Georges-Marie Raymond, a scholar and founder of the newspaper Savoie. In 1851, Deputy Jules Philippe and Magistrate Camille Dunant revived the Académie florimontane in Annecy, originally founded in 1607 by François de Sales and Antoine Favre. In 1855, Claude Saillet, François Rabut, and Joseph Dessaix established the Savoy Society for History and Archaeology (SSHA) in Chambéry. In 1856, Dr. Mottard founded the Maurienne History and Archaeology Society in the Maurienne region. These societies fostered regional identity within the kingdom.

== Charles-Félix of Sardinia (1821–1831) and disappointed hopes ==
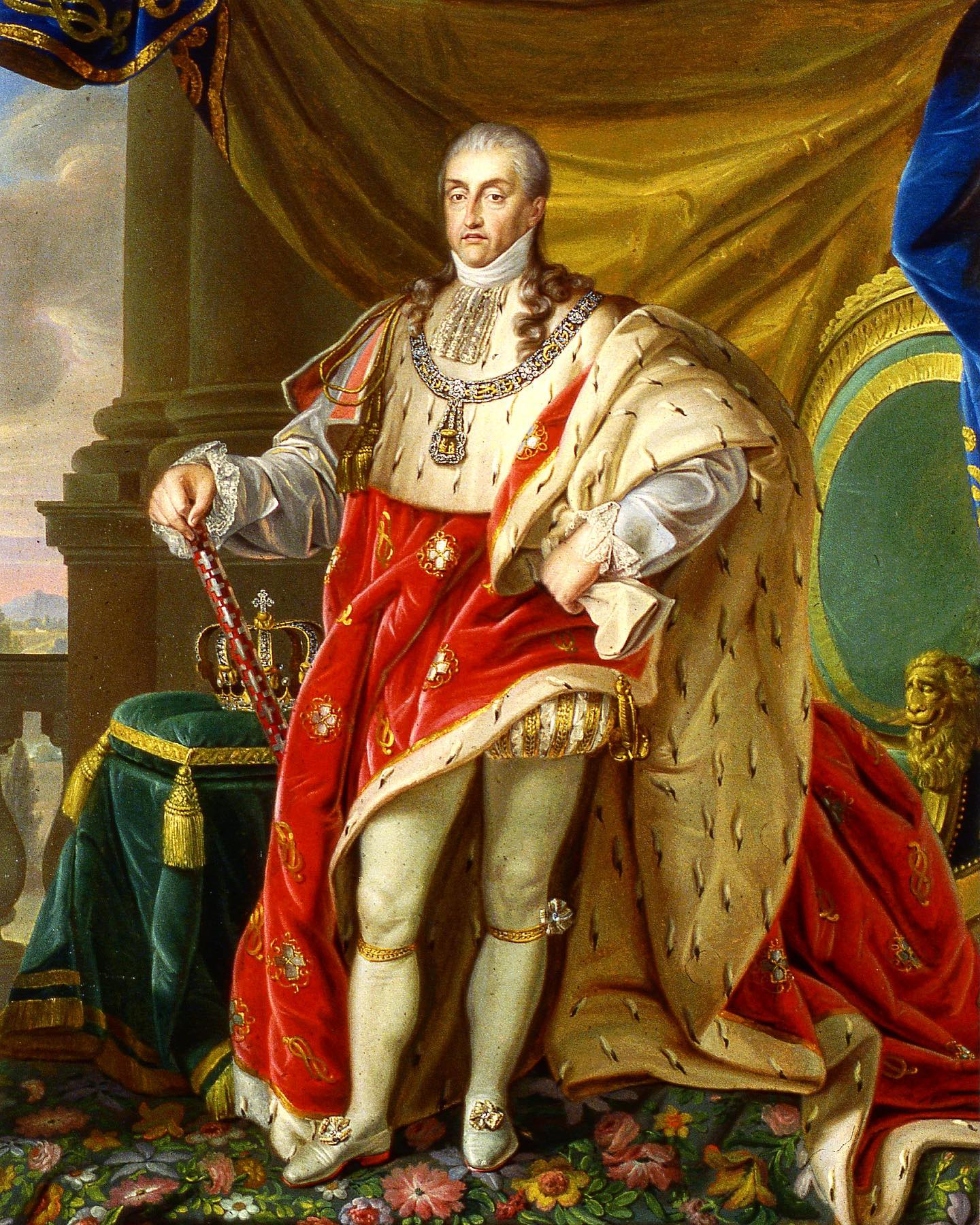
Charles-Félix of Sardinia.

The Piedmontese revolution of 1821 sparked hopes for a liberal constitution in Italy. Under pressure, regent Charles Albert of Savoy-Carignano enacted the “Spanish” constitution, inspired by the Spanish Constitution of 1812. Upon his return, Charles Felix abolished it, restoring an authoritarian monarchy.

=== The regency of Charles-Albert ===
In the early 19th century, Italian Peninsula secret societies advocated liberal reforms. In Piedmont, a conspiracy emerged in 1820, culminating in a revolt in January 1821. Led by Santorre di Santa Rosa, the conspirators opposed the absolutist rule of Victor Emmanuel I of Sardinia and sought to initiate a war of independence against Austrian influence. They approached Charles Albert of Savoy-Carignano, second in line to the throne, who was influenced by Enlightenment ideas from his time in Paris and Geneva and had past ties to the Carbonari. Santorre di Santa Rosa urged Charles Albert to mediate with Victor Emmanuel I for a liberal constitution or to support the independence movement. On March 10, 1821, the Alessandria garrison, influenced by the Carbonari, revolted. With Charles Felix of Sardinia absent in Modena, Victor Emmanuel I appointed Charles Albert as regent on the night of March 12–13, 1821, anticipating his inexperience might prompt Austrian intervention.

On March 12, 1821, Charles Albert of Savoy-Carignano, acting as regent, promulgated a constitution based on the Spanish Constitution of 1812. Three days later, Charles Felix of Sardinia issued a proclamation condemning Charles Albert’s liberal actions and ordered him to abandon the liberals and join him. Charles Albert complied, secretly leaving on the night of March 20–21. On April 8, Austrian forces entered Piedmont and defeated the liberal troops at the Battle of Novara (1821). The remaining liberals faced persecution, imprisonment, or execution. Charles Albert, disgraced, withdrew to Florence in Tuscany.

=== Maintenance of a monarchical regime and interest in Savoy ===
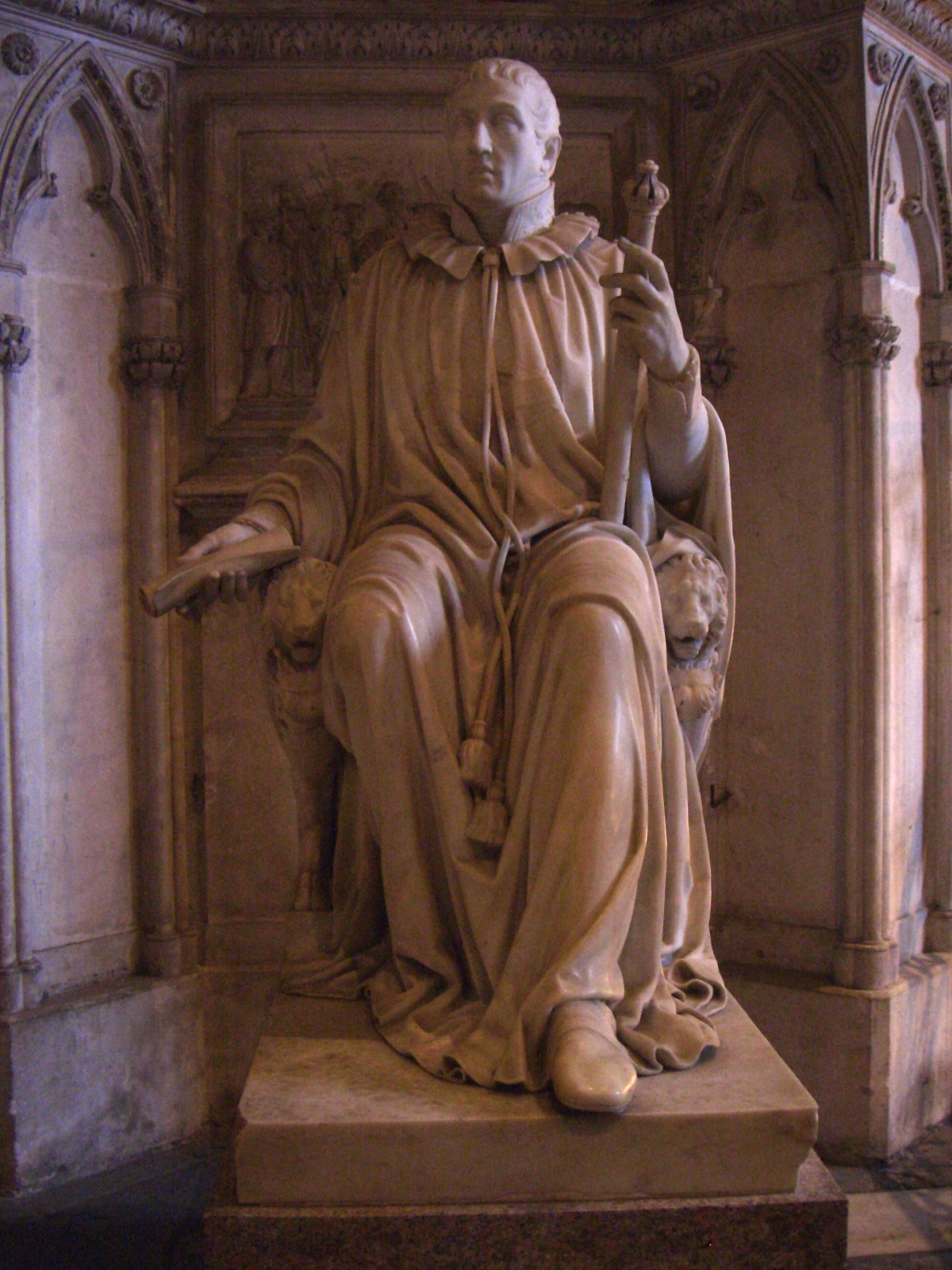
Charles Felix of Sardinia is buried in the Royal Abbey of Hautecombe.

Charles Felix of Sardinia reestablished a conservative regime focused on order. Only two Savoyards served in key roles: Roget de Cholex, Minister of Industry, (Note: Gaspard Roget de Cholex (1771-1828) was a Geneva lawyer. He was granted the title of count by Charles-Felix in 1824. Palluel-Guillard 1999, p. 618) and Sallier de La Tour, First Secretary of State for Foreign Affairs, who attended the king's council meetings.

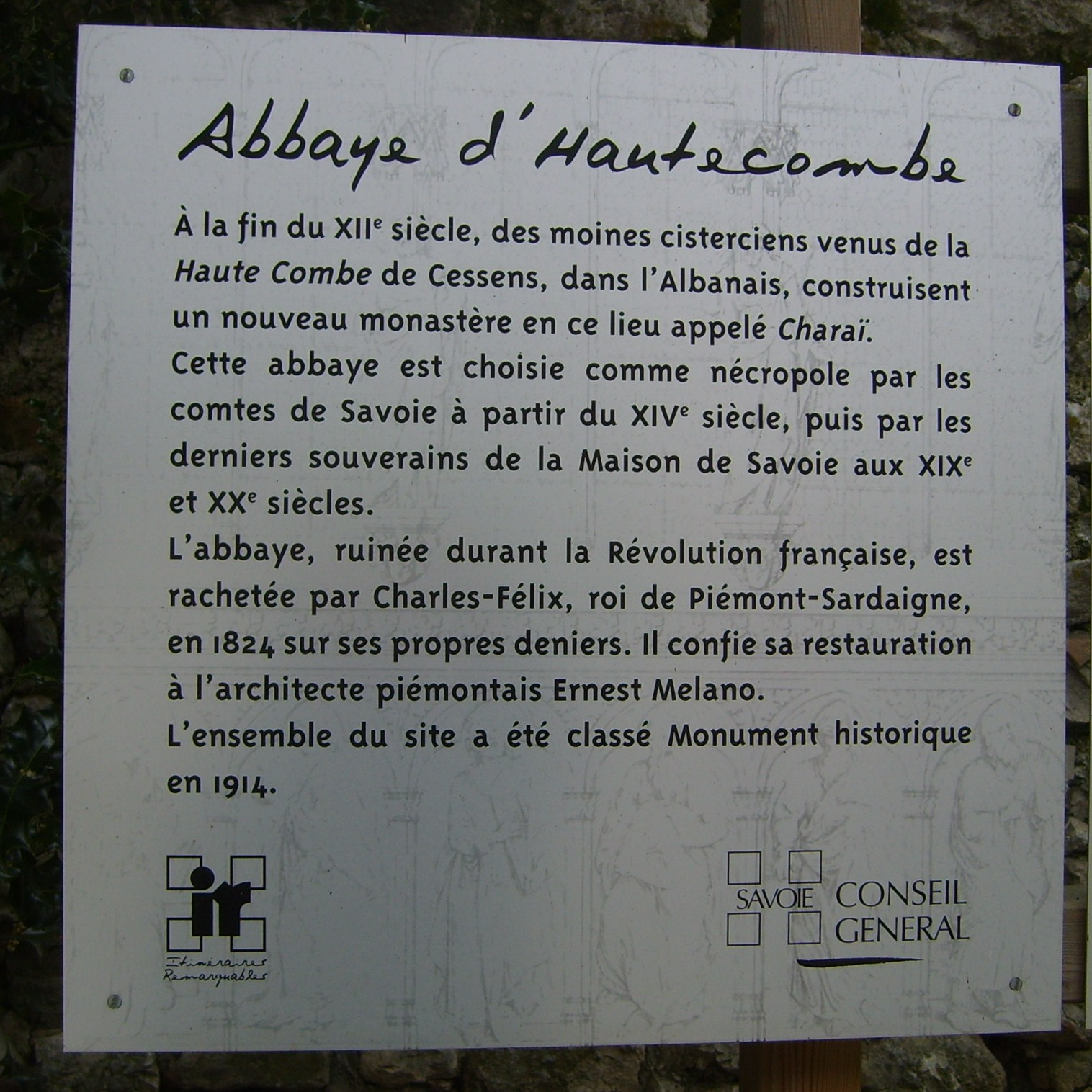
Plaque commemorating the purchase of the Royal Abbey of Hautecombe in 1824 by Charles Felix of Sardinia.

Charles Felix of Sardinia supported initiatives in his family's homeland, (Note: Savoy is generally considered the territorial birthplace of the House of Savoy and the central core of the States of Savoy, although the dynasty originated in the County of Maurienne, with the Humbertians (see Humbert I of Savoy), around the 11th century.) focusing on religious and architectural projects. In 1822, he restored the Diocese of Annecy, followed by the dioceses of Maurienne and Tarentaise in 1824. In 1826, he oversaw the restoration of the Church of Saint Francis, the chapel of the first monastery of the Visitation. He also ordered the return of the relics of Saint Francis de Sales and Saint Jane Frances de Chantal, previously hidden in the Château de Duingt by the Visitandines during the French Revolution, and attended their transfer to Annecy.

To reinforce his family's historical and religious ties, Charles Felix of Sardinia acquired the Hautecombe Abbey, the House of Savoy's necropolis, (Note: The Abbey of Hautecombe has been considered the necropolis of the House of Savoy since Humbert III of Savoy, in 1189. Ten counts, two dukes, and two kings from the House of Savoy are buried there.) which had been looted and sold as national property. He commissioned Italian architect Ernesto Melano to restore the abbey, previously used as a pottery workshop. Satisfied with the restoration, Charles Felix knighted Melano into the Order of Saints Maurice and Lazarus and tasked him with restoring Tamié Abbey. The neo-Gothic troubadour style, described by Henri Ménabréa, librarian at the Chambéry Municipal Library, as "coquettish and troubadour, out of step with the warrior ruggedness of the first Counts of Savoy," drew mixed reactions. As the last direct descendant of the Humbertians, Charles Felix chose to be buried at Hautecombe Abbey in 1831. His wife, Maria Cristina, continued the restoration until 1846.

=== The beginnings of the industrial revolution ===
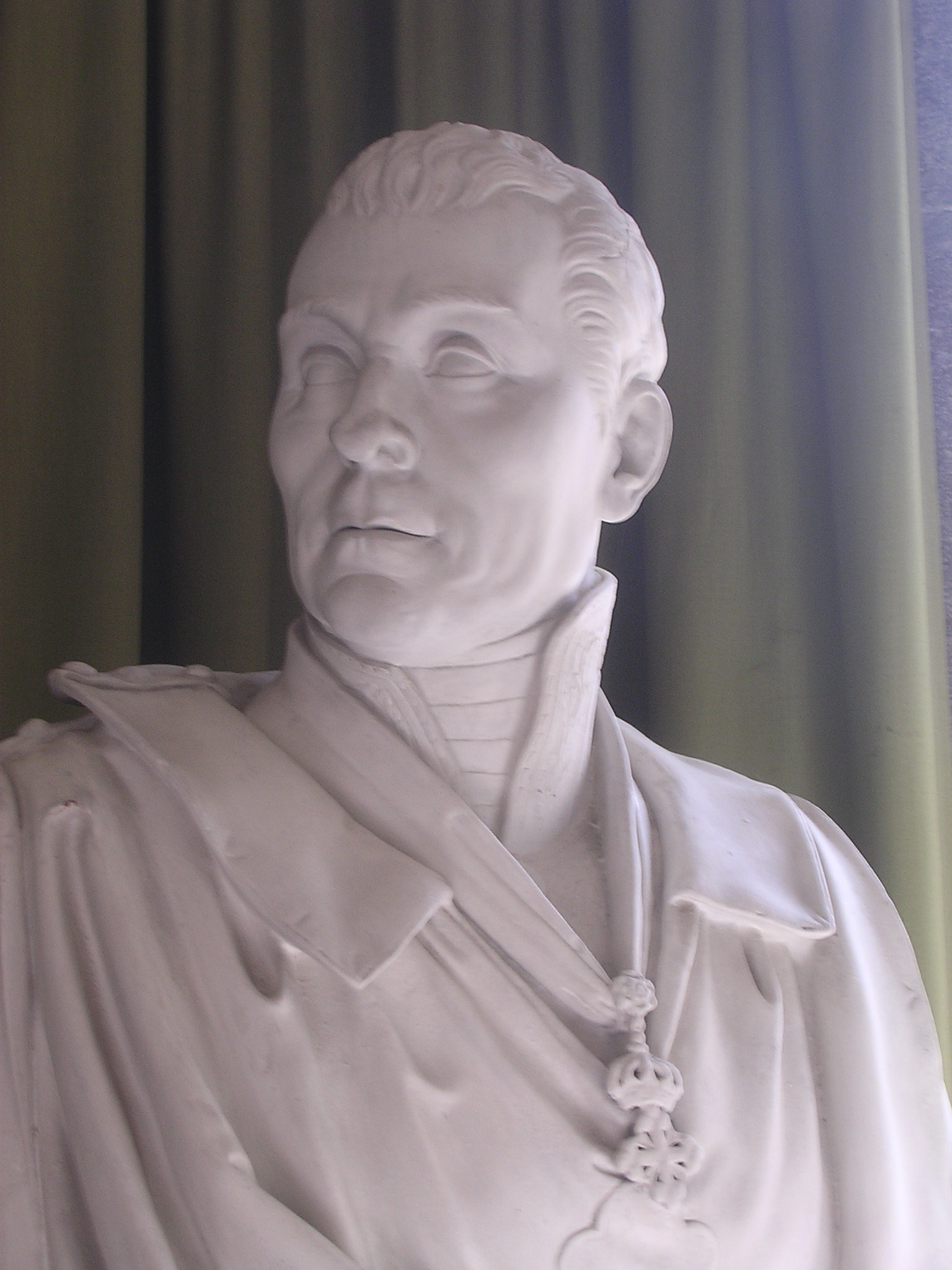
General Benoît de Boigne, founder of a shelter for the poor and elderly in Chambéry.

To address customs barriers imposed by French authorities, Charles Felix of Sardinia improved connections between Albertville and Geneva and enacted liberal customs laws to support merchants. In Savoy, public assistance programs expanded, backed by General Benoît de Boigne in the Chambéry region. These initiatives included establishing an asylum for the poor and elderly, creating a hospital for contagious diseases, expanding the Hôtel-Dieu, providing aid to prisoners, and improving access to local libraries and learned societies.

Agriculture was the primary economic resource in Savoy. In 1825, the Royal Chamber of Agriculture and Commerce of Chambéry was established to promote crop diversification and agricultural improvement. Land was primarily owned by the local nobility and bourgeoisie. Historian Pierre Barral observed that at agricultural fairs, "the recruitment was limited to a small number of major landowners who rarely farmed themselves; they acted in the name of the influence rightfully belonging to the notables in a society based on established wealth."

Early mountain excursions, led by the bourgeois elite, created limited opportunities for mountain farmers:

The inhabitants of Lanslebourg-Mont-Cenis are naturally robust, active, and hardworking. Most are employed in leading or transporting travelers and their luggage across Mont-Cenis, and in guiding or collecting them during the snow season, on their return from Piedmont. In the region, what is called "getting picked up" means going down the mountain in a straight line while sitting on a sled that can hold two people and is steered by a single man seated in front, using his heels with surprising boldness and dexterity. Once arrived in Lanslebourg-Mont-Cenis, the driver hoists his small vehicle onto his shoulders and climbs back up to the place called "la ramasse" to wait for other travelers.

— Quotation from Statistique du département du Mont-Blanc (1802) by Jean-Joseph de Verneilh-Puyraseau (Note: Jean-Joseph de Verneilh-Puyraseau (1756-1839) was a French politician and deputy from the department of Mont-Blanc. Citation p. 139.)

Watchmaking in Savoy, particularly in Faucigny, developed significantly with the establishment of the Royal School of Watchmaking in Cluses, founded by Achille Benoit in 1848. This formalized an industry active since the 18th century, aiming to reduce local worker emigration. In the 1890s, the curriculum expanded to include mechanics and electricity.

=== Primary education ===
During the Sardinian Restoration, Savoy communes benefited from numerous schools established during the French occupation starting in 1792. A 1847 publication noted that "the Duchy of Savoy, which has 629 communes, possesses 647 primary schools for boys and nearly as many for girls." By the time of annexation, there were 1,900 primary schools. Approximately 85% of Tarentaise villages had a school in the early 19th century, though these operated only a few months annually, primarily in winter. Instruction was delivered by poorly trained and underpaid seasonal teachers. School establishment often depended on the town syndic, parental initiative, or funding from a successful local bourgeois. French language instruction was frequently provided by Catholic priests, known as "vicar-regents," who opposed Calvinism, or by religious confraternities.

In some Savoy schools, students were required to bring “chauffoirs” or “couvets” (wood logs) to heat classrooms. These logs, particularly in damp weather, generated significant carbon dioxide, occasionally causing mild asphyxiation in several students.

== Charles-Albert of Savoy-Carignan (1831–1849) and the liberal regime ==
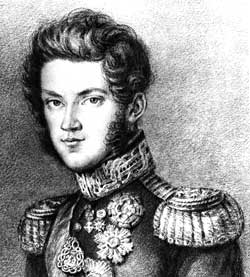
Portrait of Charles Albert of Sardinia in 1817.

During his exile, Charles Albert of Savoy-Carignano served as a soldier under Louis Antoine, Duke of Angoulême, nephew of Louis XVIII, in the fight against Spanish liberals. He fought in the Battle of Trocadero on August 31, 1823, earning the title “First Grenadier of France” for his bravery. He returned to Charles Felix of Sardinia after pledging to uphold the monarchy’s absolute power. In 1829, he was appointed Viceroy of Sardinia, and upon Charles Felix’s death in 1831, he became King of Sardinia. Although his earlier liberal regency ideals had faded, liberal principles continued to spread in the kingdom, particularly in Savoy.

=== The choice of loyalty over liberalism ===
Liberal ideas gained traction in Savoy, particularly among the bourgeoisie. In January 1832, an anti-clerical uprising occurred in Chambéry following a sermon against liberalism by French Jesuit Claude Guyon. In 1833, Piedmontese officers in Chambéry, aligned with Giuseppe Mazzini’s republican Young Italy movement, mutinied, resulting in the execution of twelve officers that spring. Pope Gregory XVI established an apostolic delegation to oversee the Savoyard clergy, perceived as overly sympathetic to liberalism, but the Senate of Savoy rejected its proposals on January 30, 1833, calling them “dangerous innovations whose publication would strike fear into consciences and sow discord within families.”

In 1834, Mazzini sought to spark a general uprising in the Kingdom of Sardinia and tasked Girolamo Ramorino, a former Napoleonic French general, with initiating a rebellion in Savoy. Ramorino led a group of Polish and Italian revolutionaries, along with a few Savoyard exiles, infiltrating through Annemasse and Les Échelles. Despite advocating for liberal principles such as human rights, poverty alleviation for peasants and workers, fairer wages, and the formation of associations, they were pursued by local peasants.

Despite interest in liberal ideas, the Savoyards remained loyal to their king and did not rebel. Charles Albert of Sardinia expressed his affection for Savoy in a letter dated January 12, 1849, to conservative deputy Louis-Marie Pantaleon, Marquis Costa de Beauregard, stating: “At no time has any sovereign loved (Savoy) as much as I have, nor more ardently desired to secure its true well-being and happiness.” His connection to the region was reflected in his decision to merge the historic city of Conflans with the village of L'Hôpital-sous-Conflans, established in the 12th century by the Knights Hospitaller at the confluence of the Isère and Arly rivers. The new municipality was named Albertville, and Charles Albert supported its development.

=== The King's liberal turn and Savoyard misunderstanding ===
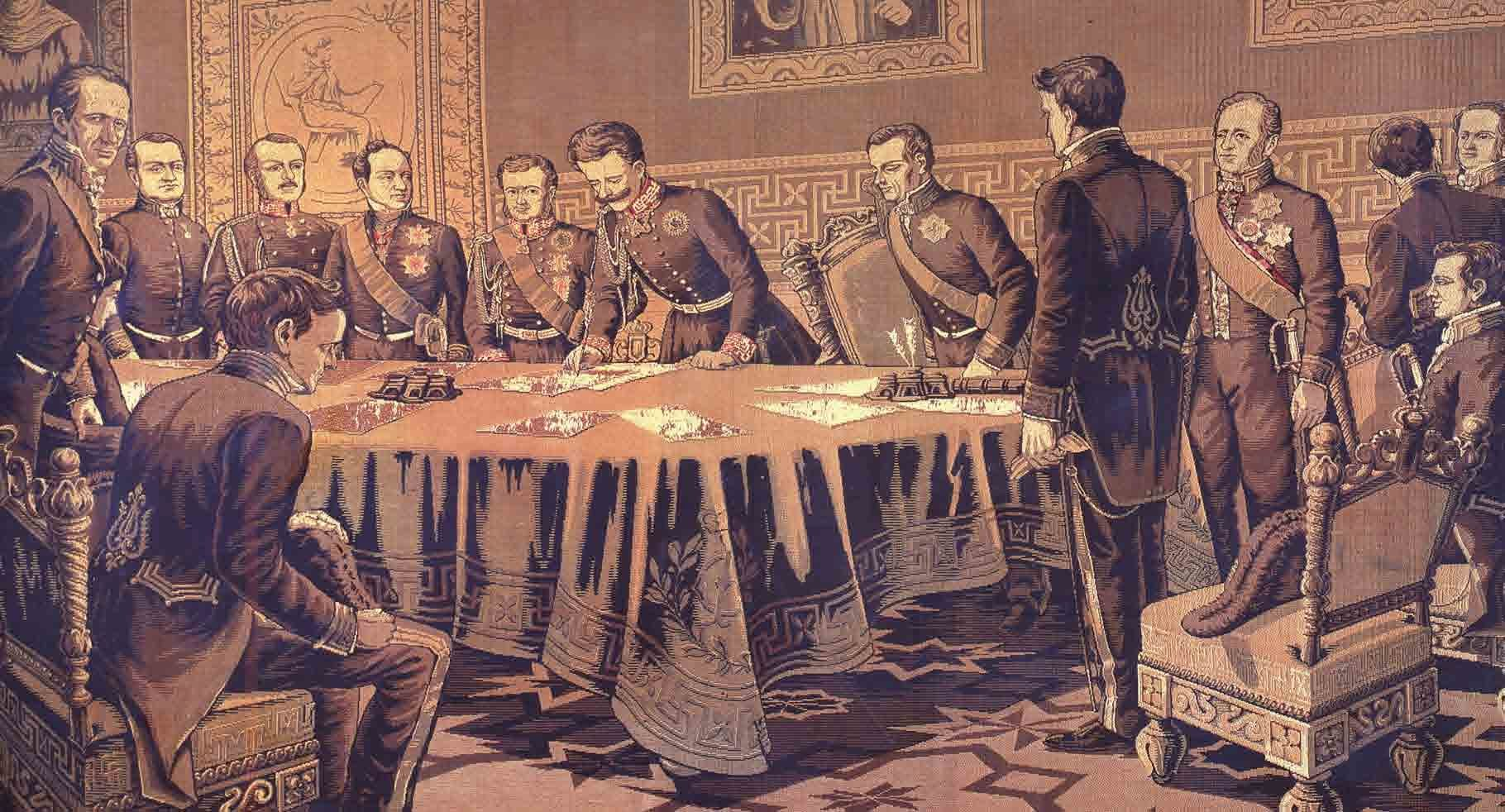
Charles Albert of Sardinia signing the Albertine Statute (March 4, 1848).

The Italian states in 1843, with Savoy in the Kingdom of Sardinia.

Starting in 1846, Charles-Albert, influenced by liberal ideas, introduced judicial and administrative reforms in the Kingdom of Sardinia, including the election of municipal councils. By 1847, two major political movements emerged: a republican, revolutionary faction inspired by Giuseppe Mazzini, and a monarchist group advocating for political freedoms and economic progress, led by Cesare Balbo, Massimo d'Azeglio, and Camillo Cavour. These groups collectively formed the Risorgimento, a movement for Italian unification, which garnered limited support among Savoyards. On February 3, 1843, Le Courrier des Alpes, an opposition newspaper, was established in Chambéry by Jacques-Marie Raymond, later joined by his brother Claude-Melchior Raymond and poet Jean-Pierre Veyrat. Succeeding the Journal de Savoie (1815–1842), it promoted Catholic, monarchist, and conservative views.

In March 1847, Pope Pius IX, recently elected, introduced liberal reforms in the Papal States, gaining widespread support. In October 1847, Charles Albert dismissed his unpopular minister, Clemente Solaro della Margherita, in the Kingdom of Sardinia. Amid the Revolution of 1848, Charles Albert reluctantly signed the Albertine Statute on March 4, 1848, establishing a new constitution despite opposition from Savoyard nobles. The government included two chambers: the Subalpine Senate, appointed by the King and based at the Palazzo Madama, Turin, and the Chamber of Deputies, elected by literate citizens paying over 20 francs in taxes, located at the Palazzo Carignano in Turin. Between 1848 and 1860, Savoy, with a population of 583,812, had 51,000 eligible voters who elected 79 deputies and had five representatives in the Upper Chamber. (Note: The five senators representing the duchy are: Count Clément de Maugny, Joseph-Louis-Thomas Girod, Laurent Picolet, General Hector Gerbaix de Sonnaz, and Baron Joseph Jacquemoud.)

In 1848, French republicans advocated for liberty in France and the emancipation of foreign peoples. Amid rising unemployment in Paris, Alphonse de Lamartine advised Savoyard emigrants to return to Savoy, where they were expected to spark an uprising. On March 31, 1848, Emmanuel Arago, Commissioner of the Republic and son of François Arago, along with the voraces, organized a march on Chambéry. This group, primarily workers from the Lyon region, aimed to support revolutionary Savoyard refugees seeking freedom. Historian Paul Guichonnet notes that Lamartine, as French Foreign Minister, sought to provide military aid to the Kingdom of Sardinia against the Austrians, with the intent to annex part of Savoy.

On March 31, 1848, a group “composed of 600 to 700 men, of whom barely 80 were armed,” occupied Chambéry, raising French and Italian tricolor flags but lacking a clear agenda. The voraces, led by Philibert Reveyron, attempted to establish a republican municipality at City Hall with twelve notable citizens. Opposition from the bourgeoisie, clergy, and anti-radical rural population led to an armed attack on the workers' barracks. Following cautious directives from French Foreign Minister Alphonse de Lamartine, 148 participants were arrested and sentenced. French diplomatic efforts, including the dispatch of an ambassador, secured the release and expulsion of the involved French and Savoyards to France.

On June 15, 1848, a new opposition newspaper, Le Patriote Savoisien – Journal politique, industriel, commercial, agricole et littéraire d'opposition, was established in Chambéry. Led by moderate liberal Nicolas Parent, it was followed by other publications, including the satirical Le Chat in Chambéry and L’Allobroge in Saint-Jean-de-Maurienne.

=== Economic and social situation ===
In 1833, limited exploitation and resources prevented Savoy from utilizing its natural wealth, leading to reliance on imports from France, Switzerland, and Italy. Cloth, hats, silks, and fine fabrics were sourced from Grenoble and Lyon; jewelry from Grenoble, Lyon, or Geneva; small machinery from France and Switzerland; tanned leather from Carouge and Geneva; hardware from France and Geneva; tools from Germany; and calico and other manufactured goods from England via Switzerland and Genoa.

Savoy's industry was largely underdeveloped, with mining as the primary exception. The region's mountains were rich in iron, copper, silver, lead, and coal. Iron ore from Saint-Georges-des-Hurtières supported nine major plants or blast furnaces, producing 20,000 quintals of pig iron annually. This was refined to “fifteen quintals of 556 pounds” at a rate of fourteen ounces per pound (marc weight). (Note: At the time when Savoy was part of France, it was recognized that without the mixture of refuse from the Saint-Georges-d'Hurtières mine, one could not produce the fine steel used in arms factories, hardware, etc.)

cheeses from the regions of Faucigny, Bauges, Beaufort-sur-Doron, Tarentaise, and Maurienne were marketed in Piedmont, Lombardy, France, and Switzerland. Goat tallow, valued for candle-making, is in demand in Lyon and Geneva. Salted butter, stored in barrels, is exported to southern France and Spain. Pig trading, conducted at fairs in Annecy, Montmélian, Bonneville, La Roche-sur-Foron, and the Vallée de l’Hôpital during November and December, is a significant source of revenue.

According to historian Paul Guichonnet, workers in Annecy and across the Sardinian States faced severe hardship due to the absence of social legislation. Louis Rendu, originally from Meyrin in the Pays de Gex and bishop of Annecy (1842–1859) and a pioneer of social Catholicism, criticized employers for poor working conditions, low wages, and long hours. He proposed establishing support committees in industrial areas, consisting of a judge, an intendant, a parish priest, a doctor, and two members appointed by the Minister of the Interior to safeguard workers' rights. The minister rejected the proposal, viewing it as a threat to industrial leaders.

The rural population of Savoy faced significant poverty, exacerbated by harsh mountain living conditions that contributed to health issues such as rickets, goiter, and cretinism. The Royal Commission of 1848 reported that approximately 3% of the population was affected by these conditions.

Following Louis-Napoléon Bonaparte's rise to power on December 10, 1848, some members of the Savoyard bourgeoisie supported the idea of uniting with France, perceiving it as more economically stable and respectful of Catholicism compared to the Sardinian kingdom. However, most Savoyards remained indifferent to the prospect.

=== An industrial awakening ===
In 1839, proposals emerged to enhance connectivity between the Sardinian kingdom and France through a railway line. On August 30, 1839, Joseph François Médail, a customs broker and public works contractor, proposed a tunnel under Mont Fréjus. On December 10, 1839, the Gazetta del Piemonte published a study by Camillo Benso, Count of Cavour, advocating for a railway linking the Sardinian kingdom to France via a Mont Fréjus tunnel. On September 14, 1840, a preliminary plan for a communication line, including a ten-kilometer tunnel 650 meters below Mont Cenis, was presented at the Scientific Congress in Turin.

Belgian engineer Jean Marie Henri Maus was commissioned by King Charles Albert to study a railway route between Modane and Susa. He submitted reports on August 8, 1845, March 26, 1846, and June 29, 1848.

From 1843, the agricultural fair of Saint-Jean-de-Maurienne became a key event for promoting agricultural modernization and increasing yields, attracting notable figures from the province, including Bishop François-Marie Vibert, Intendant Chevalier d’Alexandry, Senator Anselme of Chambéry, industrialist Balmain, lawyer and industrial owner Grange, and Dr. Mottard.

In 1815, approximately 1,800 workers were employed in watchmaking and small-scale mechanics in the ArveValley (Cluses), Carouge, and Faucignyin Savoy. The cotton mill in Annecy, established in 1806 by Baron Jean-Pierre Duport in the former Sainte-Claire convent, was the largest in the Sardinian States. By 1847, it employed over 1,000 workers, operating 998 looms and 33,595 spindles.

Industrialization in Savoy's cotton mills resulted in harsh working conditions. In 1848, spinners, paid by piecework, earned approximately 2 francs daily. Child laborers, working 14-hour shifts to reconnect broken threads, earned 70 centimes per day, while young girls received 15 centimes. The piecework system incentivized spinners to pressure child workers to increase output.

The Duchy of Savoy had numerous thermal springs, but by 1830, only those at Aix-les-Bains and Saint-Gervais were in use. A thermal spring at Brides-les-Bains in the Tarentaise Valley, discovered in 1818 following a flood of the Doron de Bozel river, led to the establishment of the first thermal complex there in 1845.

=== The War of Independence in Italy ===
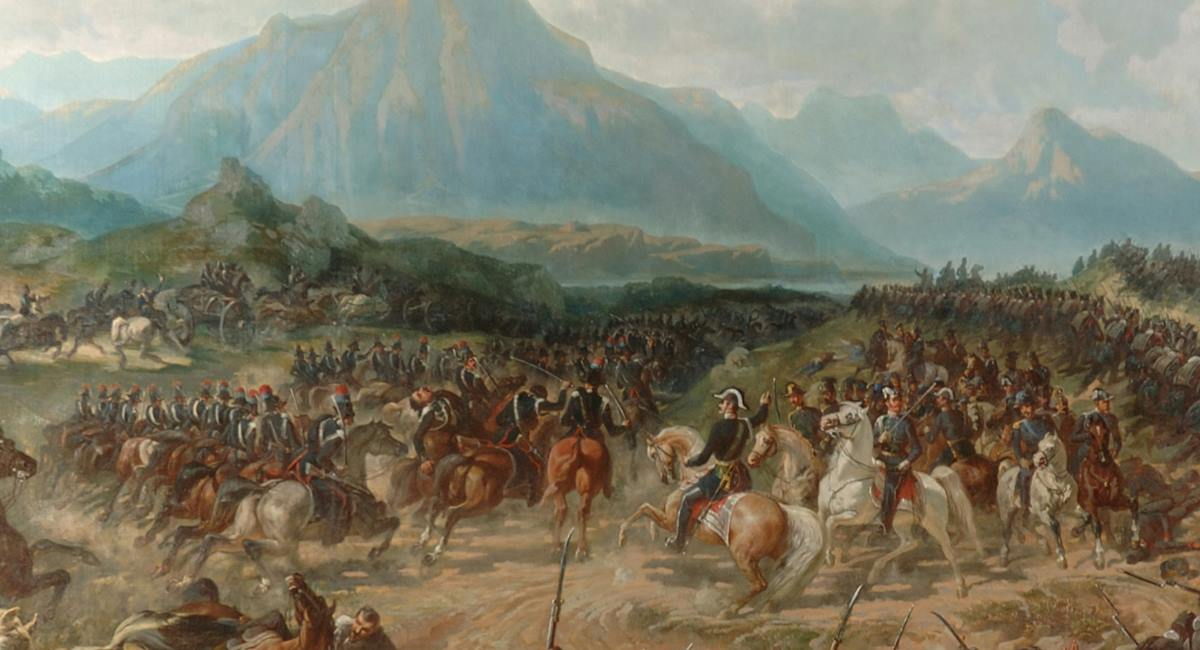
On April 30, 1848, at Pastrengo, the cavalry of King Charles Albert of Sardinia charged the enemy lines.

The First Italian War of Independence in 1848 marked the beginning of Italy's unification, targeting Austrian control over Lombardy and Venetia, established at the Congress of Vienna. King Charles Albert, backed by major Italian states, aimed to expel the Austrians. In March 1848, Milanese insurgents, after five days of street fighting, forced Austrian Marshal Radetzky to withdraw from Milan. On March 25, 1848, Sardinian forces and Savoyard volunteers entered Lombardy to liberate it. The Savoy brigade fought at Pastrengo, Rivoli, and Volta, earning a Silver Medal for Military Valor for its regiment's flag and recognition from the King.

Yet this war was not popular in Savoy:

- “A high and mighty barrier separates Savoy from Italy—its customs, habits, language, and commerce assign it no place in the great Italian family that is to be formed one day,” declared Louis Marie Pantaleon Costa before the Chamber on December 27, 1848.
- “If the War of Independence is popular in Piedmont, it is not in Savoy. You are fighting for your independence and nationality—but we, why are we fighting?” remarked Deputy Gustave de Martinel during the session of March 1, 1849, in the Chamber.
- One deputy summed up the situation as: “Your cause is not ours.”

The First Italian War of Independence, administrative decentralization, high customs tariffs on French imports, and a forced loan to cover armistice indemnities faced strong opposition in Savoy. On February 16, 1849, sixteen Savoyard deputies signed a memorandum outlining the region's societal conditions, demanding autonomy for Savoy, which had historically conquered Piedmont but was now subordinate to it.

In the Sardinian kingdom, Savoyard political factions, including the left, right, and conservatives, increasingly questioned their region's integration. Concurrently, Victor Emmanuel II , who succeeded Charles Albert after the First War of Independence, and Camillo Cavour sought French support to counter Austrian influence, necessitating concessions to France.

=== Administrative organization ===
The law of August 30, 1840, reorganized the administrative structure of the Duchy of Savoy, maintaining its eight provinces. Savoie-Propre was assigned an independent general intendant in Chambéry, and the Genevois received one in Annecy. The Chambéry intendant oversaw the jurisdictions of Maurienne, Haute-Savoie, and Tarentaise. Administrative laws, regulations, circulars, and instructions issued by Savoyard general intendants were typically published in French.

The law of October 31, 1848, reinforced the administrative structure established by the law of August 30, 1840, designating the general intendant's district as the administrative division of Chambéry and establishing a divisional council elected in the same manner as the provincial councils of the four provinces.

Prior to the 1860 annexation, the Duchy of Savoy was organized into two administrative divisions: Chambéry and Annecy, which anticipated the future departments of Savoie and Haute-Savoie, as established under the civil rights provisions of the Constitution of Year VIII. Chambéry was divided into four provinces, 29 mandements, and 341 communes, while Annecy had three provinces, 22 mandements, and 289 communes. The total population was approximately 592,223 across 1,016,490 hectares. (Note: The population of the Chambéry administrative division was 318,266, and that of Annecy was 274,057.)

== Victor Emmanuel II of Savoy (1849–1861) and the separation ==
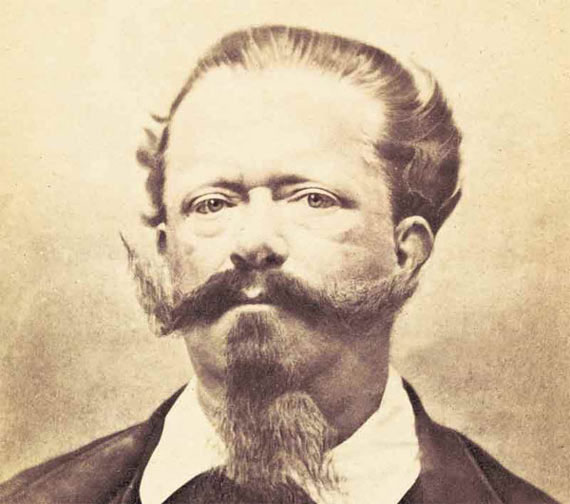
Victor Emmanuel II of Savoy.

The First Italian War of Independence strained both Savoyard and Italian subjects of King Charles Albert due to multiple defeats. The decisive defeat at Novara on March 23, 1849, prompted the king’s abdication the following day and his exile to Oporto, Portugal. His son, Victor Emmanuel, inherited the crown and, aiming to establish a modern state, maintained the Statuto (constitutional charter) despite Austrian pressure, adopting a liberal government.

=== A traditional society ===
Savoyard society before the 1860 annexation was hierarchical, characterized by a strong clerical presence overseeing religious and moral affairs, nobles and bourgeoisie managing administrative, political, judicial, and military roles, a small working class, and a majority of peasants. Historian Jacques Lovie noted in La Savoie dans la vie française (1963) that Savoy lacked mechanisms to adapt to forthcoming changes. The society was compartmentalized, with winter further isolating mountain villages.

==== The construction of the Mont-Cenis railway tunnel ====
On August 31, 1857, King Victor Emmanuel II authorized the construction of the Mont-Cenis railway tunnel, with work commencing under the supervision of engineer Germain Sommeiller. The railway line between Aix-les-Bains and Saint-Jean-de-Maurienne was completed in 1856, though its connection to the French network via Culoz was controversial. The tunnel was inaugurated between September 17 and 19, 1871, with the first train traveling from Turin to Modane, attended by Minister of Public Works Victor Lefranc and Ferdinand de Lesseps.

In 1854, to secure approval from Sardinian government officials, Savoyard engineer Germain Sommeiller drafted plans for the Mont-Cenis railway tunnel in Italian, which were then translated into French for Savoyard technicians.

==== Urbanization of Annecy ====
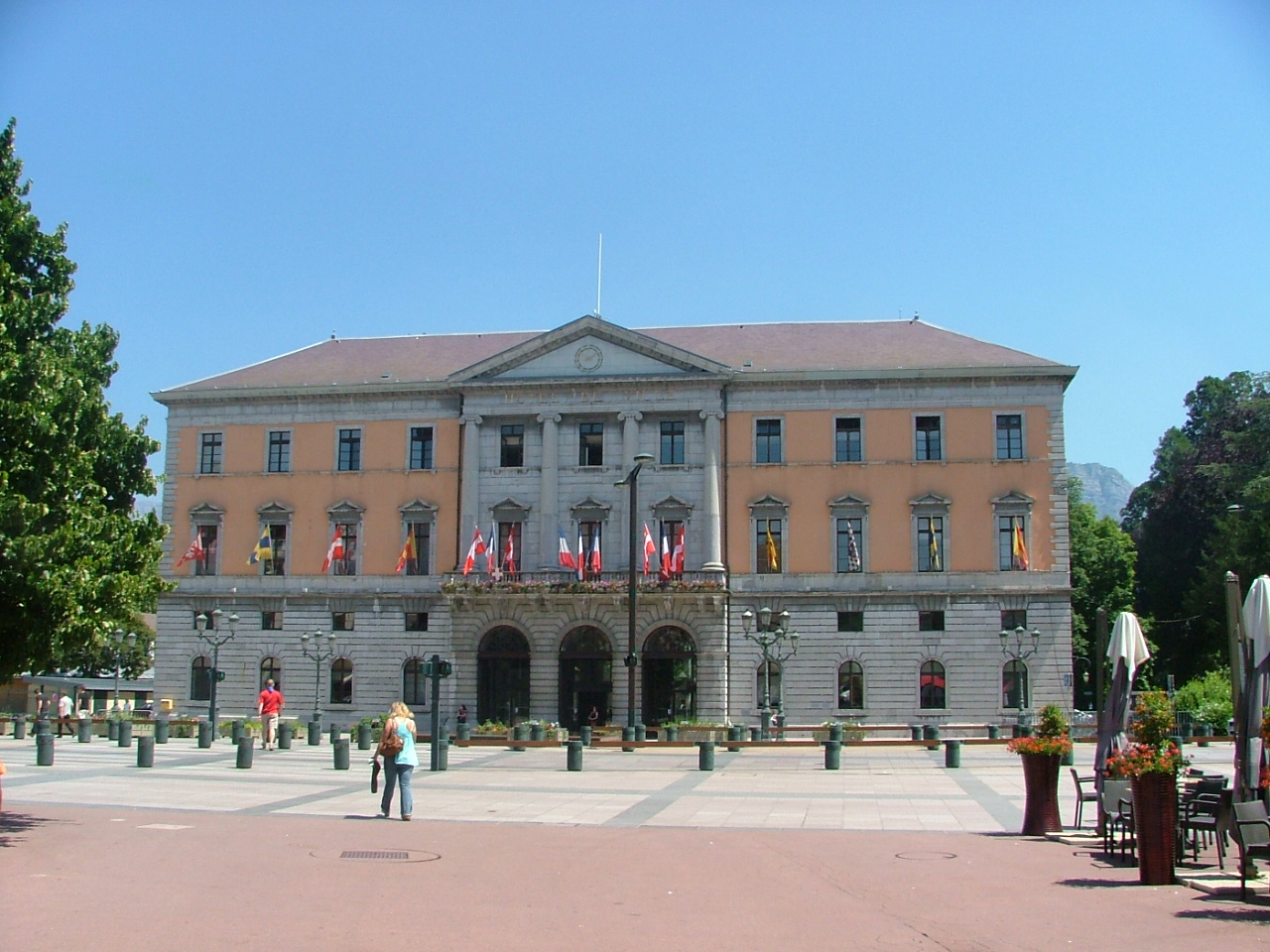
Annecy Town Hall. Building in the Sardinian neoclassical style.

Annecy, with a population of approximately 10,000, emerged as a key manufacturing center and hub of Northern Savoy in the Kingdom of Sardinia. In 1804, Jean-Pierre Duport established a significant cotton mill, described as “the most important in the Sardinian states,” within the former Sainte-Claire convent. Major urban developments, initiated in 1794, included street and square paving, bridge and quay construction, and the erection of a town hall in the Sardinian neoclassical style in 1848, inaugurated in 1857.

The development of Annecy's lakefront and the establishment of the public garden enabled visitors to cross the Pont des Amours and the Champ de Mars to access the city center. Improvements in drinking water supply and the modernization of gas lighting contributed to the economic growth of the Annecy region.

=== Toward the Union of Savoy with France ===
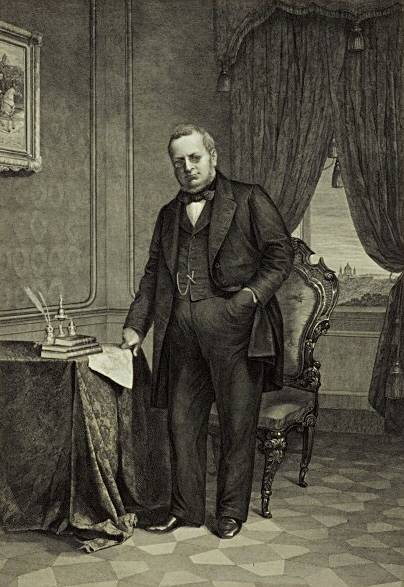
Camillo Benso, Count of Cavour

Camillo Benso, Count of Cavour, with Savoyard ancestry through his paternal grandmother from the de Sales family, retired to his estate in Leri, Vercelli province, Piedmont, where he engaged in an agricultural association and led the journal Il Risorgimento.

In Savoy, the issue of clerical rights was significant, with the Siccardi laws of 1850, which abolished ecclesiastical immunities, reduced legal holidays, and eliminated the right of asylum in churches, facing strong opposition from Savoyard deputies. These measures, however, increased the popularity of King Victor Emmanuel II, as noted by Sardinian official Camille Dunant during the King’s visit to Annecy in May 1850: "The most frequent cries were 'Long live the King! Long live the Constitution! Long live the Siccardi law!'" (Note: Letter from Camille Dunant to her sister Clotilde, dated May 25, 1850, personal collection.) The Rattazzi law, enacted between November 1854 and May 29, 1855, suppressed monastic orders, confiscated convent property, and established an ecclesiastical fund to reassign religious personnel, but was opposed by a majority of Savoyard deputies during the Chamber vote. (Note: The law proposed by Urbano Rattazzi was approved by the majority in the Chamber. Of the 23 opposing votes, 15 were from the 22 Savoyard deputies.) Resistance also arose against the auction of the Hautecombe estate, with public discontent in Chambéry, Yenne, and La Roche. The law, combined with the Crimean intervention, contributed to political radicalization in the 1857 elections, where Savoy elected 20 out of 22 Catholic conservative deputies. By 1860, support for Savoy’s annexation to France grew significantly, with many who opposed it in 1848 becoming strong advocates.

New taxes, combined with Sardinian military involvement in the Crimean War (1853–1856) and poor harvests, provoked public discontent, with the press criticizing the heavy tax burden on workers and peasants. Camillo Benso di Cavour, advocating for Sardinian participation in the war to secure French support, stated in 1852: "It is above all on France that our destiny depends." The Savoyard brigade, led by Colonel Philibert Mollard, was among the forces deployed to Crimea, and Mollard was appointed a Commander of the Legion of Honour for his service.

By 1860, public opinion in Savoy was split over Cavour’s policies. In 1858, following the announcement of the birth of Louis-Napoléon, Prince Imperial, the newspapers L’Écho du Mont-Blanc and Le Courrier des Alpes provoked Sardinian authorities by concluding an article with: "Long live the Emperor! Long live France! Long live Savoy!" In the neighboring Swiss provinces of Faucigny, Chablais, and Lower Geneva, some residents favored joining the Swiss Confederation, promoting their views through the newspaper La Savoie du Nord, founded in Bonneville. (Note: La Savoie du Nord was the organ of the pro-Swiss, strongly anti-annexationist movement, and was only published from February 27 to May 5, 1860.) A petition supporting this proposal collected over 13,651 signatures from 60 municipalities in Faucigny, 23 in French Chablais, and 13 around Saint-Julien-en-Genevois.

Constitutionalist and liberal deputies, such as Antoine Louaraz, supported Cavour while advocating for lower customs duties for Savoy and stronger measures against clerical influence. Their newspapers, Le Patriote savoisien and L’Indépendant du Faucigny, opposed Napoleonic authoritarianism and the separation of Savoy from Piedmont.

On January 14, 1858, Napoleon III survived an assassination attempt by Felice Orsini, a prominent figure in the Italian Risorgimento, which strained Franco-Sardinian relations. Napoleon III urged Victor Emmanuel II to address revolutionary activities. A letter from Orsini, read at the Seine assize court and published in the Gazzetta Ufficiale of Turin, stated: "May Your Majesty not reject the final wish of a patriot on the steps of the scaffold—deliver my homeland, and the blessings of 25 million citizens will follow you into posterity."

In May 1858, Dr. Henri Conneau, physician to Napoleon III, visited Turin to inform Cavour of the Emperor’s planned visit to Plombières. On July 21, 1858, Cavour and Napoleon III met at the Pavilion of the Princes in Plombières, where decisions regarding Savoy’s future were made.

=== War against Austria (May–July 1859) ===
In early 1859, the Kingdom of Sardinia adopted a confrontational policy toward the Austrian Empire. Giuseppe Mazzini and Giuseppe Garibaldi returned to Italy to form the "Hunters of the Alps" (Cacciatori delle Alpi), a volunteer corps including exiles from the Austrian-controlled Kingdom of Lombardy–Venetia. Aware of the Plombières Agreement, Austria preemptively declared war on Sardinia on April 26, seeking to repeat Marshal Joseph Radetzky’s 1849 victory at Novara. France, committed to a defensive alliance and facing no domestic political resistance, honored the treaty.

In April 1859, Camillo Benso, Count of Cavour, assured of French support, rejected an Austrian ultimatum on April 23. On April 27, Austrian forces crossed the Ticino River. French troops, arriving via the Mediterranean and Mont Cenis, were welcomed by the Savoyard population in Chambéry and the Maurienne Valley. Costa de Beauregard noted: “The idea of an Italian war is universally unpopular in Savoy. As long as we remain united, you will see Savoy at the front lines fighting Piedmont's enemies.” (Note: Speech of February 10, 1859, before the Parliament of Turin.) During the Battle of Solferino on June 24, 1859, the Savoyard Brigade and the 3rd Division, led by General Philibert Mollard, captured the Madonna della Scoperta hill through a bayonet charge.

By 1859, the cession of Savoy to France seemed increasingly probable, viewed as compensation for France's military support. The population of southern Savoy largely supported this union, anticipating military protection and favorable trade conditions.

== 1860: Annexation ==
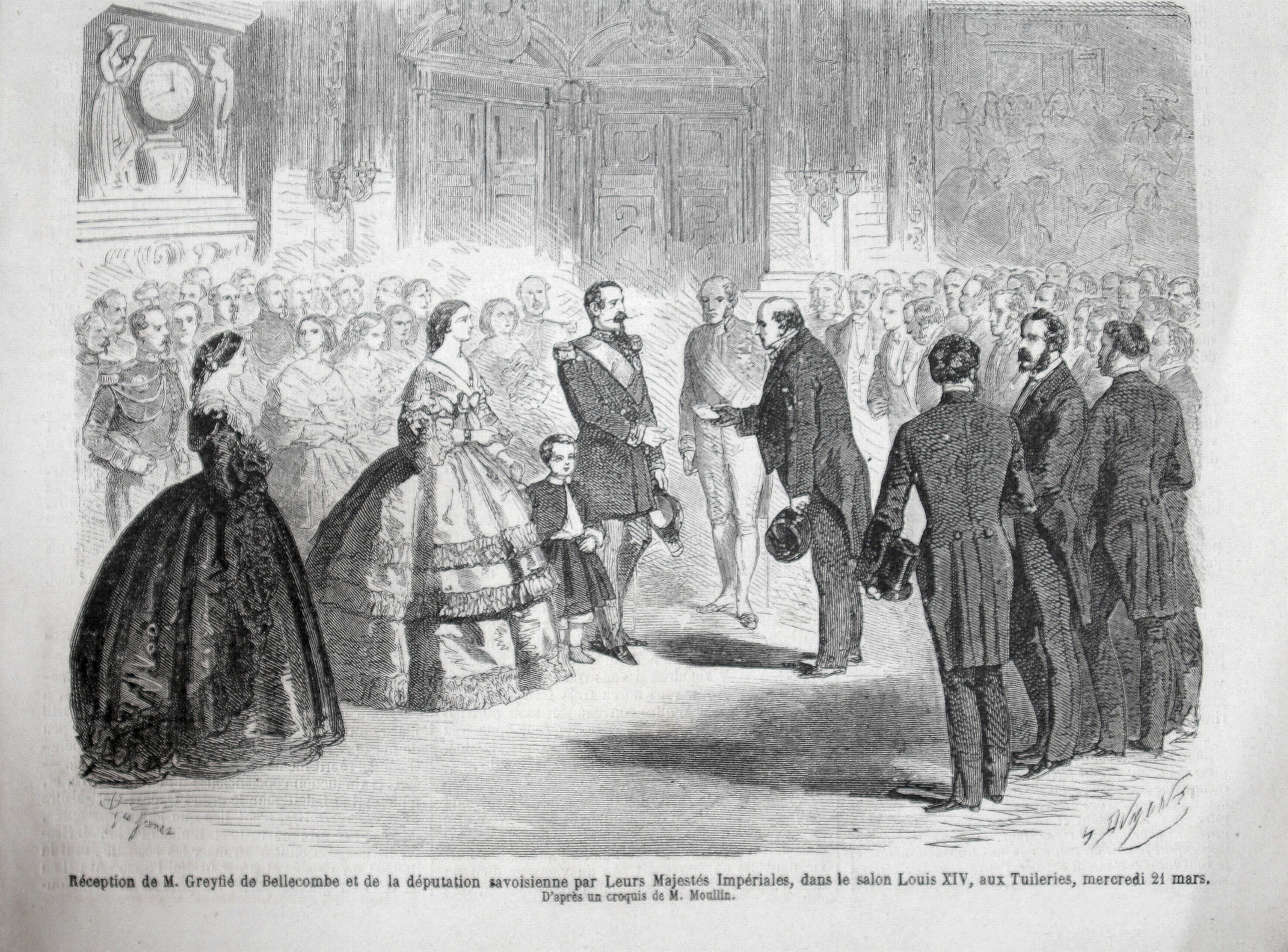
Sketch by M. Moulin, published in Le Monde Illustré, weekly newspaper, no. 155, March 31, 1860. Caption: “Reception of Mr. Greyfié de Bellecombe and the Savoy delegation by Their Imperial Majesties, in the Louis XIV salon, at the Tuileries, Wednesday, March 21.”

In exchange for France’s support in the conquest of Lombardy, despite Sardinian claims that France prematurely ended the conflict, King Victor Emmanuel II of Sardinia ceded the Duchy of Savoy and the County of Nice to France under the Treaty of Turin on March 24, 1860.

=== Preparations: Propaganda ===
In preparation for the April 1860 plebiscite, intended to legitimize the annexation of Savoy to France in the eyes of the United Kingdom and Switzerland, French Senator Armand Laity, appointed as extraordinary imperial commissioner, oversaw extensive pro-annexation propaganda. Concerns arose that parts of Savoy might seek to join the Swiss Confederation. Governors of Chambéry and Annecy were instructed: "Each commune must have a syndic who is firmly devoted to the French annexation, as he is the one who must give the impulse and preside over the electoral operations. A syndic loyal to the 'Piedmontese' or wishing for Switzerland would be completely inappropriate in such a circumstance. Significant purges have already taken place in the Province of Chambéry, among the syndics who were hostile or suspicious. The governor of Annecy would certainly do the same if necessary." Dr. Albert-Eugène Lachenal, governor-regent of Annecy, implemented these directives. Measures were taken to ensure the unity of the former duchy and support the annexation, including the proposal of a large free zone in Northern Savoy to counter potential Swiss integration.

=== The free zone ===
Between February and March 1860, a petition in Chablais and Faucigny advocated for union with Switzerland, stating: "We have been united with France for a few years, and many still feel their hearts beat at the memory of this time. We have been closely united with Piedmont since 1848. However, despite all our sympathies for either a free Italy or France, other higher sympathies lead us to decide on annexation to Switzerland... Yes, this is our dearest desire, based on our exclusive ties with Geneva, our commercial interests, and so many benefits that we could not find elsewhere." Supported by the Journal de Genève, the petition originated in the Savoyard villages of Boëge and Saxel and collected 13,651 signatures from 60 communes in Faucigny, 23 in French Chablais, and 13 around Saint-Julien-en-Genevois. (Note: It is noted that some signatories have strange signatures: Messrs. "Arago, Dobormida, Lanza, Pain, Viande, Rotisseur, Lymmatico, etc.," "Mousse, the dog of Mr." or that "idiots" have affixed their signatures.) The initiative received backing from Bern and the United Kingdom, though several German-speaking Swiss cantons opposed creating a French-speaking, predominantly Catholic 23rd canton.

In its February 18, 1860 edition, Le Courrier des Alpes criticized efforts to divide the Duchy of Savoy. (Note: The possibility of the union of Savoy with France has given rise to all sorts of maneuvers in the city of Geneva and beyond—maneuvers aimed at detaching from the old Savoyard family the provinces of Chablais, Faucigny, and even part of that of Annecy. Such attempts, which threaten to destroy a community of interests, sentiments, glory, and national honor (...) To divide Savoy would be to tear apart its history, to humiliate its noble and patriotic pride—in other words, to insult what a people holds dearest in the world (...)" Cited by Victor-Bénigne Flour de Saint-Génis (1869, p. 355), Luc Monnier (1932, p. 113), in Mémoires et documents de la Société savoisienne d'histoire et d'archéologie (1933, p. 115)) To maintain unity in the northern regions, Joseph Joseph Jacquier-Châtrier, a liberal deputy from Bonneville, proposed creating a large free zone covering Chablais and Faucigny. He remarked: "Do not doubt it, Helvetia has its supporters. A country that doesn't pay taxes, that is not driven by dynastic ambitions, and is not deprived of its youth by military conscription and permanent service—this country has a prestige that is just as valuable as the three colors..."

The proposed free zone was opposed by the pro-Swiss Savoyard newspaper La Savoie du Nord and the Journal de Genève. In its edition of 2 March 1860, the latter stated: "This promise of a free zone is a lie; they want to deceive you to make you vote for France [...] Be certain that if France takes Chablais and Faucigny, it is to later force Geneva to become French, and for that, the customs line must be placed at the very gates of the city to bind it like a yoke and make it cry out for mercy, securing its surrender."

The free zone was partially based on a pre-existing customs area located in approximately twenty Savoyard communes bordering the canton of Geneva, some of which had been ceded to Switzerland under the Treaty of Turin in 1816. It comprised three distinct areas, which should not be confused with the Neutralized Zone of Savoy:

- The "Sardinian zone of Saint-Julien" (151 km²), established by Article III of the Treaty of Turin of 1816.
- The "Sardinian zone of Saint-Gingolph" (33 km²), established by a royal manifesto on September 9, 1829.
- A large zone in Northern Savoy (3,112 km², or 70% of the Haute-Savoie department), covering the districts of Thonon (Chablais), Bonneville (Faucigny), and part of Saint-Julien-en-Genevois (Haut-Genevois), created in 1860. It was exempt from all duties on products coming from Switzerland, while products were taxed when they crossed the border in the opposite direction. (Note: The law of February 16, 1923, ended this large free zone, as well as the Neutralized Zone of Savoy, following an agreement between France and Switzerland. See Delaloye, 2002.)

While the populations were generally favorable to the initiative, French propaganda directed by Senator Armand Laity, with the support of the governor of Annecy, Dr. Lachenal, was notably effective. Additionally, Savoyards residing in Paris returned to the region to encourage mobilization among the local population.

=== Proclamation of the vote ===
The vote held on April 21 and 22, 1860, proceeded calmly, with the outcome widely anticipated in advance. Religious services took place, including the singing of Domine salvum fac Imperatorem (Lord, protect the Emperor). (Note: Judgment delivered by Dr. Truchet of Annecy on June 8, 1860.) On April 29, the Court of Appeals in Chambéry, during a solemn session, officially confirmed the results of the plebiscite, which asked: "Does Savoy wish to be united with France?" The vote was conducted by secret ballot, offering a choice between "Yes" and "No," except in the northern part of the duchy, where a "Yes and Zone" option was used, interpreted as an affirmative response.

Plebiscite April 1860
Territory	Date	Registered voters	Voters	In favor of annexation	Voted 'Yes and Free Zone'	Against annexation	Abstentions	Invalid ballots (incl. pro-Swiss)	Army (Note: This refers to the Savoyards who were engaged in various Royal Sardinian Army corps and were not in the duchy during the plebiscite, notably the prestigious Brigade of Savoy stationed in Turin. Out of 6,350 military votes, there were 6,033 yes votes, 283 no votes, and 34 invalid ballots. Heyriès 2001, p. 187)
Savoy	April 22/23	135,449	130,839	130,533	47,076 (Note: The unanimity is almost total. The votes cast for the concerned region numbered 47,774. These were supplemented by 232 "Yes" ballots, only 132 "No" votes, and 35 invalid ones. Cited by Raymond, Justinien (1983). La Haute-Savoie sous la IIIe République : histoire économique, sociale et politique, 1875-1940 [Haute-Savoie under the Third Republic: economic, social, and political history, 1875–1940] (in French). Seyssel: Atelier national de reproduction des thèses. p. 44. ISBN 2-90352-825-X.)	235	approx. 600	71	6,033 out of 6,350
Sources: Henri Ménabréa - Paul Guichonnet

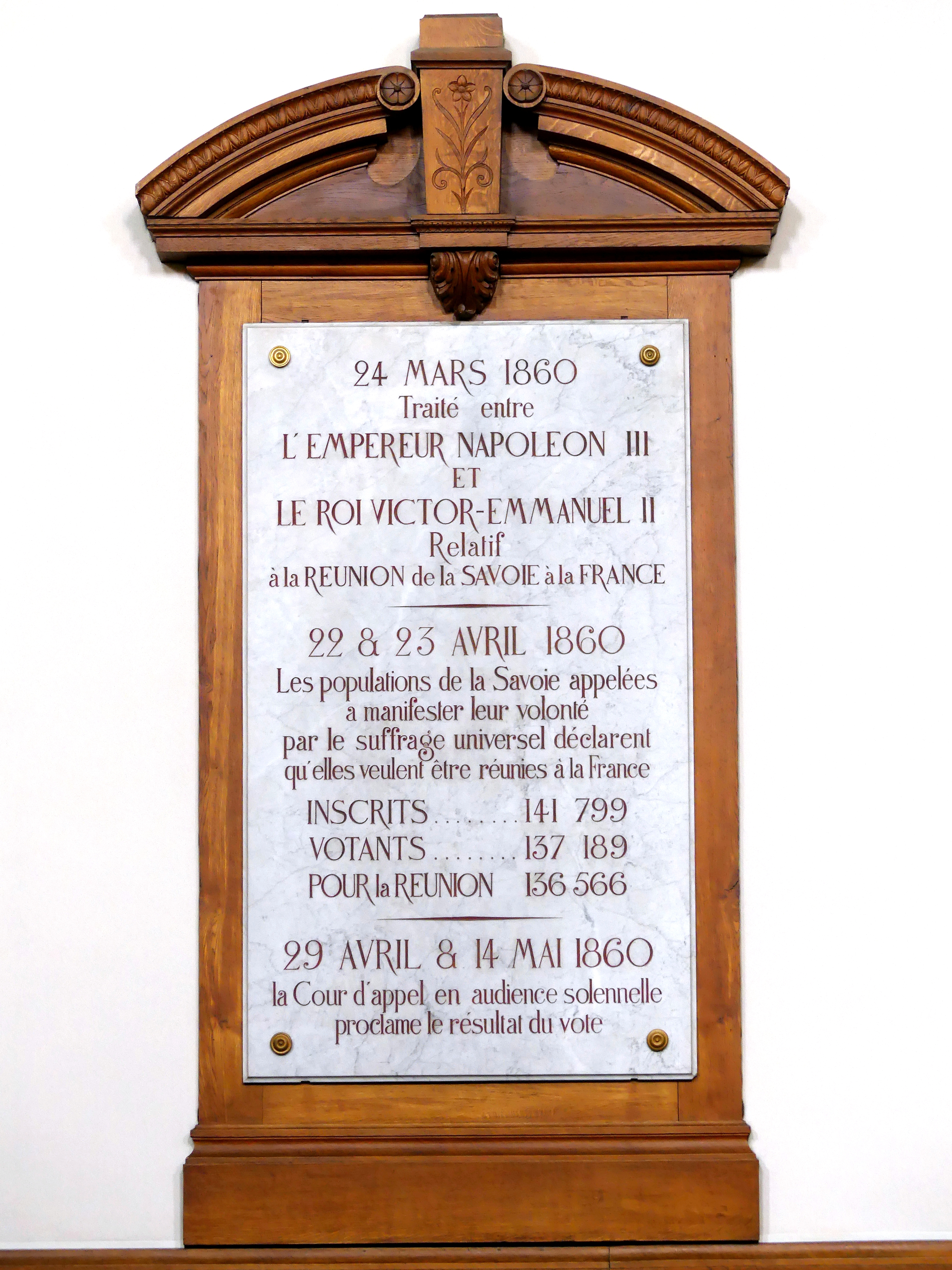
Commemorative plaque marking the annexation in the ceremonial courtroom of the courthouse in Chambéry, where the results of the plebiscite were announced and made official.

On May 29, 1860, the Chamber of Deputies in Turin ratified the Treaty of Cession signed on March 24, with 229 votes in favor, 33 against, and 25 abstentions. The Senate approved the treaty by 92 votes to 10. On June 12, 1860, the French Senate adopted the senatus consultum formalizing annexation. The French constitution and laws became applicable on January 1 to all of Savoy and the arrondissement of Nice, which were thereby integrated into the French Empire. On June 14, an official ceremony marking the transfer of Savoy to France was held at the Château de Chambéry. During the event, Senator Armand Laity, representing the French Emperor, and Chevalier Carlo Bianchi de Castagné, representing the King of Sardinia, signed the official documents in the presence of the future prefects of Savoy and Haute-Savoie.

The plebiscite resulted in a unanimous outcome. However, in certain communes, "No" ballots were not made available. On April 16, 1860, the intendant of Maurienne, Édouard Milliet de Faverges and Challes, wrote to the interim governor in Chambéry, Charles Dupasquier: "As for the 'No' ballots, none were distributed... Legality kills, as Mr. Guizot used to say, Mr. Laity made me understand that one must also defend oneself against legality. How many times have I cursed it! How many injustices with legality! It is all the more worthy of hatred because it is often sovereignly hypocritical! And yet, without this legality, with the best intentions in the world, everything would go to hell. Meanwhile, I let the 'No' ballots go to hell."

== See also ==
=== General articles ===
- Kingdom of Sardinia (1720–1861)

=== Detailed articles about Savoie ===
- 1st Infantry Regiment "San Giusto"
- Neutralized Zone of Savoy
- Treaty of Paris (1815)
- Annexation of Savoy
- Treaty of Turin (1860)

=== Related articles about neighboring countries ===
- Unification of Italy
- House of Savoy
- Second French Empire
- Switzerland as a federal state

== Bibliography ==
=== General books ===
- Cerisier, Emmanuel; Leguay, Thérèse; Leguay, Jean-Pierre (2005). Histoire de la Savoie [History of Savoy] (in French). Paris: Éditions Jean-paul Gisserot. ISBN 2-87747-804-1.
- Delaloye, Gérard (2002). Un Léman suisse : la Suisse, le Chablais et la neutralisation de la Savoie (1476-1932) [A Swiss Lake Geneva: Switzerland, the Chablais region, and the neutralization of Savoy (1476–1932)]. Archives vivantes (in French). Yens-sur-Morges/Saint-Gingolph: Éditions Cabedita. ISBN 2-88295-345-3.
- Mayeur, Jean-Marie; Sorrel, Christian; Hilaire, Yves-Marie (1996). La Savoie [Savoy] (in French). Vol. 8. Paris: Beauchesne. ISBN 2-70101-330-5.
- Edighoffer (1992). Histoire de la Savoie [History of Savoy]. Que sais-je? (in French). PUF. ISBN 978-2-13-044838-9.
- CH (1969). Cahiers d'Histoire (Revue) : « La Savoie. Des origines à nos jours » (Tome V, 4) [Cahiers d'Histoire (Journal): “Savoy: From its origins to the present day” (Volume V, 4)] (in French). Lyon: PUF.

=== Works on the period ===
- French-Italian Study Center (2000). Culture et pouvoir en Italie et dans les États de Savoie de 1815 à 1860 [Culture and power in Italy and the Savoy states from 1815 to 1860] (in French). Éditions Slatkine. ISBN 978-8-8776-0914-4.
- Avezou, Robert (1932). "La Savoie depuis les Réformes de Charles-Albert jusqu'à l'Annexion à la France, 1re partie (1847-1852)" [Savoy from the Reforms of Charles Albert to the Annexation by France, Part 1(1847-1852)]. Mémoires et documents publiés par la Société savoisienne d'histoire et d'archéologie (in French). 69: 1–176.
- Avezou, Robert (1933). "La Savoie depuis les réformes de Charles-Albert jusqu'à l'annexion à la France, 2me partie (1852-1860)" [Savoy from the reforms of Charles Albert to annexation by France, part 2 (1852–1860)]. Mémoires et documents publiés par la Société savoisienne d'histoire et d'archéologie (in French): 73–248.
- de Saint-Genis, Victor Flour (1869). Histoire de Savoie d'après les documents originaux depuis les origines les plus reculées jusqu'à l'annexion : La révolution (1713 à 1860) [History of Savoy based on original documents from its earliest origins to its annexation: The Revolution (1713 to 1860)] (in French). Vol. 3. Chambéry: Imprimerie Bonne, Conte-Grand.
- Heyriès, Hubert (2001). Les militaires savoyards et niçois entre deux patries, 1848-1871 : Approche d'histoire militaire comparée : armée française, armée piémontaise, armée italienne [The Savoyard and Niçois soldiers between two homelands, 1848-1871: A comparative military history approach: the French army, the Piedmontese army, and the Italian army]. Études militaires (in French). Vol. 30. Montpellier: Université Paul-Valéry-Montpellier III. ISBN 978-2-8426-9385-5.
- Milbach, Sylvain (2008). L'éveil politique de la Savoie, 1848-1853 : Conflits ordinaires et rivalités nouvelles [The political awakening of Savoy, 1848-1853: Ordinary conflicts and new rivalries]. Histoire (in French). Rennes: Presses Universitaires de Rennes. ISBN 978-2-7535-0697-8.
- Milbach, Sylvain (2008). Entre Piémont et France : la Savoie déroutée, 1848-1858 [Between Piedmont and France: the turmoil in Savoy, 1848–1858] (in French). Chambéry: Éditions de l'université de Savoie. ISBN 978-2-9157-9750-3. ISSN 1771-6195.
- Palluel-Guillard, André (1986). La Savoie de Révolution française à nos jours, XIXe-XXe siècle [Savoy from the French Revolution to the present day, 19th-20th centuries] (in French). Ouest France Université. ISBN 2-85882-536-X.

=== Works on the Annexation of Savoy ===
- Varaschin, Denis (2009). Aux sources de l'histoire de l'annexion de la Savoie [At the origins of the history of the annexation of Savoy] (in French). Peter Lang. ISBN 978-9-05201-570-5.
- Guichonnet, Paul (1982). Histoire de l'annexion de la Savoie à la France et ses dossiers secrets [History of the annexation of Savoy to France and its secret files] (in French). Roanne: Éditions Horvath. ISBN 978-2-71710-235-2.
- Engels, Friedrich (1970). "La Savoie, Nice et le Rhin (1860)" [Savoy, Nice, and the Rhine (1860)]. Écrits militaires. Violence et constitution des états européens modernes [Military writings. Violence and the formation of modern European states] (in French). Éditions L'Herne. pp. 449–490.
