= Savoy Region Movement =

Savoy Region Movement Mouvement Région Savoie (French) Mouvament Règ·ion Savouè (Arpitan)
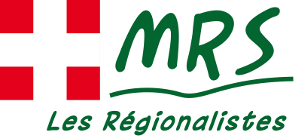
- Leader: Laurent Blondaz
- Founded: 1972
- Headquarters: allée du Quert-d’Amo, 74140 Chens-sur-Léman
- Ideology: Savoyan regionalism
- National affiliation: Fédération Régions et Peuples Solidaires
- European affiliation: European Free Alliance (until 2025)
- Colors: white, red, green
- National Assembly: 0 / 577
- Senate: 0 / 348
- European Parliament: 0 / 81

Website
- sabaudia-mrs.org

The Savoy Region Movement – Sabaudia (French: Mouvement Région Savoie – Sabaudia, Arpitan: Mouvament Règ·ion Savouè – Sabaudia, MRS) is a French regionalist political party based in Savoy.

The party supports the creation of a Savoyard region composed of the departments of Savoie and Haute-Savoie. Both of these departments are part of the larger Rhône-Alpes region, an 'artificial' region built in 1972. It also supports Arpitan (or Franco-Provençal), the older language of this region.

The party is a member of the Régions et Peuples Solidaires federation and the European Free Alliance, and it has had only one of its members elected to the regional council since 1992.
