= Neutralized Zone of Savoy =

Demilitarized Franco-Swiss border zone, abolished in 1928

The Neutralized Zone of Savoy was a zone of neutrality to the north of the Duchy of Savoy (corresponding more or less to the provinces of Faucigny and Chablais Savoyard, part of Genevois and Savoy proper), part of the States of Savoy or the Kingdom of Sardinia. It was set up under the treaties that followed the two abdications of the French Emperor Napoleon I in 1815. Savoy became French in 1860, and the zone was abolished in 1919. It is most of Haute-Savoie.

== Background ==
In 1814, the First Empire collapsed, putting an end to French domination of the continent. The European monarchies attempted to regain their pre-French power and establish a continental balance while thwarting any new French threat. Following the Emperor's abdication and brief return during the Hundred Days, two treaties were signed: the Final Act of the Congress of Vienna of June 9, 1815, and the Treaty of Paris of November 20, 1815. These two texts set out a special role for the territory of the Duchy of Savoy, which was about that of the Swiss Confederation. Through the intermediary of the diplomat Pictet, the Swiss Confederation obtained international status guaranteeing the neutrality and inviolability of its territory, confirming and renewing the status obtained the year after its defeat by French troops at Marignan in 1515. However, they also specified that a portion of the duchy would be granted neutrality within its territory.

Article 92 of the Final Act of the Congress of Vienna stipulated that, in the event of "open or imminent hostility, the troops of His Majesty the King of Sardinia which may be in these provinces shall withdraw, and for this purpose may pass through the Valais, if this becomes necessary; no other armed troops of any other power shall be permitted to pass through or station themselves in the provinces and territories". This article therefore stipulated that, in the event of danger, the relevant part of the duchy would be placed under Swiss protection.

The Swiss projects presented by Pictet at the Congress of Vienna took into account the possible extension of neutrality to the northern part of the duchy, and the possibility of the presence of Swiss militias in these territories. Thus a proposal of February 18, 1815 stated:

The Savoyard territory situated to the north of the mountain range running from Mont Blanc to Ugine is placed under the protection of Swiss neutrality. Whenever the government of the Confederation deems it necessary on the occasion of external dangers, it is authorized to have the above-mentioned territory occupied militarily in the same way as if it were an integral part of the States of the federation. The perpetual neutrality of this territory is recognized and guaranteed as their own [...].

Indeed, Switzerland needed to be able to defend its territory more easily by deploying its army at strategic points such as passes and defiles, as its border around Geneva, located in an open country, was indefensible. Although neutrality had been proclaimed, Switzerland was not convinced that it would be respected and continued to build fortifications long afterward.

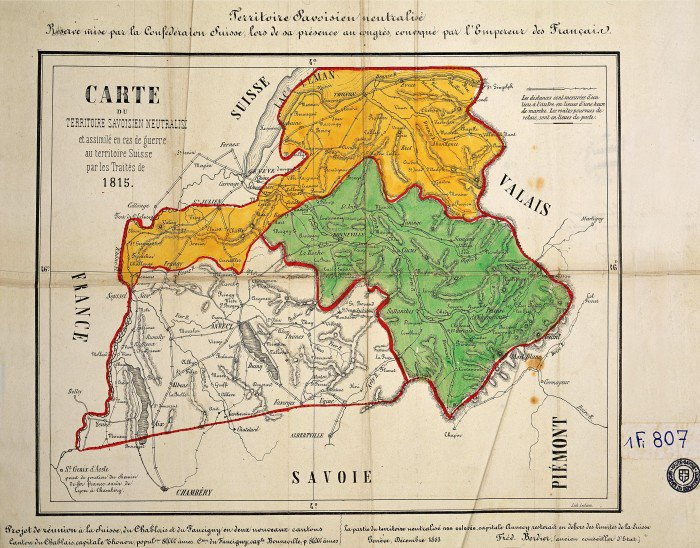
Project to join Chablais and Faucigny to Switzerland as new cantons, 1860. This map shows the neutral zone established in 1815, illustrated by a red line running from Ugine to the Avant Pays, crossing the Chaîne de l'Épine.

The King of Sardinia, Victor Emmanuel I, also called for Swiss neutrality to extend to the northern part of the Duchy of Savoy. This zone would provide a retreat in the event of an invasion from the northern provinces (Chablais and Faucigny) to Piedmont, via the Maurienne valley. The sovereign only broached this issue when the signatories were considering increasing the cantonal territory of the city of Geneva, which could only be achieved through the cession of communes belonging to the Kingdom of Piedmont-Sardinia. For the prince of the House of Savoy, the cession could only be envisaged on condition that the northern part of his duchy obtained the same conditions as Switzerland. Furthermore, his Minister of War Saint-Marsan was asked to add to the Swiss proposal that neutrality could be accepted if "whenever the powers neighboring Switzerland were in a state of hostilities, either commenced or imminent, the troops of the King of Sardinia in these provinces could withdraw and, if necessary, take the road to Valais for this purpose, that the troops of armies of any power could neither stay in nor pass through the above-mentioned provinces, with the exception of those which the Helvetic Confederation might deem appropriate to place there".

Thus, only part of the duchy was concerned with the implementation of neutrality. Initially, article 92 of the Congress of Vienna stated that the territories of the provinces of "Chablais and Faucigny (as well as) all Savoy territory north of Ugine" would be placed under this protection. At the time of the 1815 Treaty of Paris, which was responsible for its implementation, paragraph 2 of article 3 specified that this boundary went from "Ugine, including this town, to the south of Lake Annecy, through Faverges to Lescheraines, and from there to Lac du Bourget to the Rhône", (Note: Treaty of Peace of Paris, November 20, 1815, Article 3 - Paragraph 2 "The neutrality of Switzerland will be extended to the territory north of a line to be drawn from Ugine, including this town, to the south of Lake Annecy, through Faverge, to Lécheraine, and from Lake Bourget to the Rhône, in the same way as it was extended to the provinces of Chablais and Faucigny, by article 92 of the Final Act of the Congress of Vienna".) i.e. a territory comprising the two original provinces, to which was added that of the Genevois, the northern half of the Bauges massif, the Avant-Pays, but also the Lac du Bourget region, including the town of Aix-les-Bains.

This ensured that both Sardinian and Swiss troops would not be endangered in the event of an attack, as these regions were the most exposed. The defenses and fortifications were located in the Alps, in the Chablais for Switzerland, and the Maurienne and Tarentaise for the Sardinian kingdom, thus protecting the communication routes between Piedmont and the territories to the west of the Alps.

This large zone was made possible by the stricter provisions of the 1815 Treaty of Paris, in contrast to the first version of the 1814 treaty. Initially, so as not to offend French opinion too much, the congress provided for the cession of almost all the provinces of Genevois and Savoy proper, with the towns of Chambéry and Annecy becoming French. Napoleon's abortive return during the Hundred Days campaign led to a stricter policy towards France, which had to relinquish Savoy completely but retain its territorial integrity.

However, the Kingdom of Piedmont-Sardinia and the Swiss Confederation were at odds over the lack of precise terms of execution. Contrary to King Victor Emmanuel I's of Sardinia's idea of de facto protection, Switzerland considered that its right to protect and intervene remained at its discretion.

Switzerland, after the annexation of Savoy by France, tried to proclaim the attachment of Faucigny and Chablais to the Confederation. A major political campaign was launched, led by James Fazy and the Genevan radical deputy John Perrier, to win the support of the people. But the campaign quickly failed, as its instigators met with great hostility from the local population. Some were even driven out with pitchforks and forcibly returned by boat from Thonon-les-Bains to the Vaud coast.

== During the First World War ==
Savoyards were mobilized during the First World War, from 1914 to 1918. On August 28, 1914, the Savoy prefecture received a message from the military governor of the 14th region stating: "For diplomatic reasons, please postpone the organization of hospitalization of wounded soldiers in the neutralized Savoy zone", followed three days later by a new dispatch stating: "Hospitalization of wounded soldiers, including Germans, in Aix-les-Bains, neutralized zone, impossible without ministerial instructions". These messages made it impossible to admit wounded soldiers to the neutralized zone.

However, on September 2, the prefecture transcribed a telephone conversation with the Ministry of Foreign Affairs, stating: "The Minister of Foreign Affairs declares most formally that we must not place in Aix-les-Bains any French wounded likely to return to the Armies. However, there does not seem to be any disadvantage in having very seriously wounded French or Germans, whose lives are in danger or who are presumed not to recover before the end of hostilities, placed in a neutral zone. Finally, on September 4, the same ministry telegraphed the prefecture: "From the point of view of the French interpretation of treaties, Aix-les-Bains should be considered as being outside the neutral zone; consequently, there is no reason not to hospitalize the wounded there. Although Aix-les-Bains was suddenly no longer part of the neutral zone, Haute-Savoie was still well within it. As a result, the Red Cross committees of Haute-Savoy moved into the Savoy department. The Annecy, Annemasse, and Évian committees were all based in the town of Aix-les-Bains. By September 1914, the health service had 1,135 beds at its disposal in the spa town of Aix-les-Bains.

== The zones affair ==
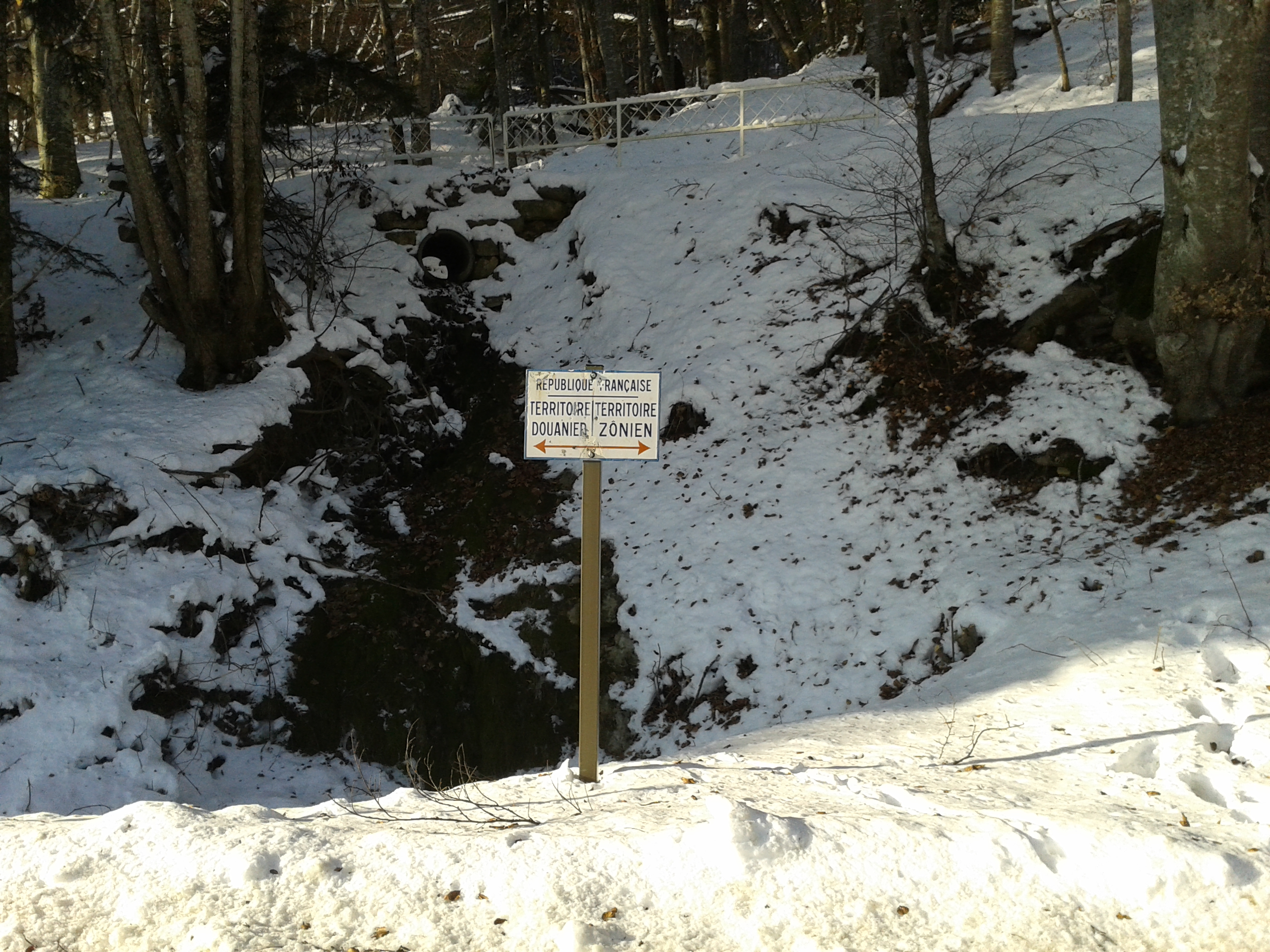
Sign indicating the boundary of the free zone in Haute Savoy, commune of Le Sappey.

In 1919, France and Switzerland agreed to repeal the neutralization of Northern Savoy. The zone no longer had any raison d'être, given that France had been the ally, not the enemy, of Piedmont-Sardinia since 1859, that the same situation had prevailed during the 1914 war, and that Switzerland's right of military occupation no longer made sense once Savoy itself had become French. Abrogated by Article 435, paragraph 1 of the Treaty of Versailles of June 28, 1919, the neutralized zone was definitively abolished in 1928. In exchange, Switzerland received French support for its entry into the League of Nations, as well as the installation on its territory of the offices of this new international organization. This article also refers to the customs-free zones of Haute-Savoy and Pays de Gex.

Later in 1932, the Permanent Court of International Justice in The Hague condemned France and called on it to re-establish the small free zone (directly linked to the conditions of annexation), in accordance with the then lapsed treaties of 1815, 1816 and 1829, i.e. 650 km², compared with 4,000 km² in the annexation treaty of 1860.

== Second World War ==
During the Second World War, the prefectural administration indicated that a pro-Swiss desire was developing in the northern part of the Haute-Savoie département. In 1943, an administrative officer for the cantons of Reignier and Annemasse noted: "Certainly, a plebiscite in the free zone of Chablais, Faucigny and part of the Genevois Savoyard would give a strong majority in favor of joining Switzerland; the reasons are simple: neutral country for a long time, more flexible administration than ours, apparently healthier currency and above all the many advantages that the population of the region would find in Geneva, university town (Lyon or Grenoble are too far away [sic]), city of art, center of commerce and industry, etc."

== Controversy ==
In 1995, the Ligue Savoisienne (Savoyan League) claimed that France had failed to respect the clauses of the neutral zone by mobilizing the Savoyards during the wars of 1870 and 1914, leading to "genocide". A leaflet from the movement stated: "In 1919, France, without consulting the people of Savoy, abolished the neutralized zone and began to abolish the free zone, which became effective in 1923. No one can claim to retain the validity of a treaty whose essential clauses have been removed, without the agreement of the contracting parties concerned. Since 1919, the pact has been broken. The annexation treaty is null and void. French institutions no longer have any legitimacy on Savoy soil".

However, the Savoyan League's argument is flawed insofar as the Congress of Vienna stipulated that only Switzerland could deploy troops in the area (which it did not, as no foreign army had ever come close), but it did not prohibit Savoyards from going off to fight, either for their country or, since the annexation in 1860, for France.

Furthermore, according to the Savoyan League, the neutralized zone and the large free zone established at the time of the Annexation (edition of "yes and zone" ballots in the northern part of the duchy) had been approved by a vote of the population at the same time as the reunion with France and could not, therefore, be abolished without a new popular consultation. The French authorities, on the other hand, argue that the neutralized zone was established by an international treaty and that it has been regularly abolished by another international treaty. Moreover, the argument put forward is irrelevant since the people of Savoy were not signatories to the text.

As for the large free zone, known as the "grande zone" or "annexation zone", it can be considered a unilateral concession or at least a commitment by Emperor Napoleon III, as it was not included in the treaty ceding Savoy to France of March 24, 1860. In this treaty, reference was only made to the small free zone of 1815, which was confirmed by the judgment of the International Court of Justice in The Hague.

The Savoyan League and other pro-independence movements have initiated various proceedings on the question of the zones, but so far no French or international court has taken any action.

== See also ==
- History of Savoy
- Treaty of Turin (1816)
- Neutral country

== Notes and references ==
=== Bibliography ===
- Lemmi, Francesco (1938). La restaurazione dello Stato sardo nel 1814-1815. Turin: Bonna.
- Ortholan, Henri (2006). "La neutralité de la Savoie. La France face à l'axe stratégique Allemagne-Italie". Revue historique des armées. 243. France-Suisse: 51-64. doi:10.3917/rha.243.0051.
- Guichonnet, Paul (2002). "La Savoie neutralisée (1815-1928)". Un Léman suisse: la Suisse, le Chablais et la neutralisation de la Savoie (1476-1932). Saint-Gingolph: Éditions Cabédita. p. 61-74. ISBN 2-88295-345-3.
- Leguay, Thérèse; Leguay, Jean-Pierre (2005). Histoire de la Savoie. Paris: Éditions Jean-paul Gisserot. p. 128. ISBN 978-2-8774-7804-5.
- Gombač, Boris (1991). Les Zones franches en Europe. Bruxelles: Bruylant. p. 310. ISBN 2-8027-0509-1.
- Milbach, Sylvain (2016). Savoie occupée, partagée, restaurée, 1814-1815. Chambéry: Société Savoisienne d'Histoire et d'Archéologie. p. 167. ISBN 978-2-8509-2034-9.
