= Treaty of Turin (1860) =

1860 treaty between France and Piedmont-Sardinia

- French annexation in 1860
- Signed: 24 March 1860
- Location: Turin, Kingdom of Sardinia
- Signatories: (Kingdom of Italy) Kingdom of Sardinia; (France) French Empire

The Treaty of Turin (Italian: Trattato di Torino; French: Traité de Turin) concluded between France and Piedmont-Sardinia on 24 March 1860 is the instrument by which the Duchy of Savoy and the County of Nice were annexed to France, ending the centuries-old Savoyard rule over these regions.

== Background ==
Emperor Napoleon III of France and Camillo Benso, Count of Cavour, Prime Minister of the Kingdom of Sardinia, met in secret at Plombières-les-Bains on 21 July 1858. They agreed that France would support the unification of Italy by Sardinia, provided that the Pope should retain control of Rome. In return Sardinia was asked to cede the Duchy of Savoy to France along with, more contentiously, the predominantly Italian speaking County of Nice.

In April 1859, Austria, complaining that Sardinia had been supplying arms to Lombard separatists, declared war on Sardinia. The Franco-Sardinian forces defeated the Austrians in several battles: Palestro, Montebello, Magenta, and Solferino.

But Napoleon III, who had taken personal command of his army, professed himself horrified by the extent of the bloodshed involved and resolved to end the war. The fighting ended with the armistice of Villafranca on 12 July 1859. The armistice led to the Treaty of Zurich of 10 November 1859, which transferred Lombardy to Sardinia. Complete Italian unification was deferred, though as matters turned out, not for long.

The late King Charles Albert of Sardinia (1798–1849) had been an active Italian nationalist. Among the liberal elites in francophone Savoy, the idea had grown up that the "House of Savoy" in Turin had little concern for their province beyond Mont Blanc. In practical terms, at a time when the extent of state activity was increasing across Europe, this was manifest in a perceived discrimination against French speakers when making government appointments. On 25 July 1859 about 30 leading citizens of Chambéry presented an address to Napoleon III, calling for Savoy to be annexed to France.

Elsewhere in Savoy, especially in the north, opposition to the idea of French annexation began to mobilise. The formerly Savoyard province of Carouge, adjacent to Geneva, had been transferred to Switzerland in 1816 under an earlier Treaty of Turin, as part of the unbundling of Napoleon I's First French Empire. Scenarios now under discussion included continuing with Savoy as a province of Sardinia, or joining more or even all of the territory with Switzerland, an outcome favored by Great Britain. There was very little support for the idea of a totally autonomous Savoy, the vulnerability of small quasi-autonomous territories having been vividly demonstrated within living memory by Napoleon I.

== Treaty ==
Faced with the uncertainties implicit in the conflicting scenarios and unwilling to countenance any further expansion of Switzerland, French and Sardinian diplomats swung into action. The 1860 Treaty of Turin, signed on 24 March 1860, was the outcome. Savoy and Nice found themselves annexed to France as discussed at Plombières in 1858 but subject to certain conditions.

Article 1 of the finalized document also stated, in deliberately vague terms, that the annexation would take place after the populations of Nice and Savoy had consented to the arrangement. Sardinian troops evacuated Savoy during March 1860. On 1 April the King of Sardinia released his Savoyard subjects from their oaths of loyalty to the Kingdom of Sardinia and a suitably crafted plebiscite (restricted to adult males, following the pattern already established in France by Napoleon III) was held in Nice on 15 and 16 April and in Savoy on 22 and 23 April to provide popular endorsement of the treaty.

To deflect anticipated resistance from the north of Savoy, where the Swiss solution had its strongest appeal, the creation was confirmed of a form of duty-free zone north of a line defined by Saint-Genix-sur-Guiers, Le Châtelard, Faverges and Ugine. The effect of that provision was that Savoy's northern frontier posts, now to become a part of the French frontier, would be located a significant distance away from the actual frontier with Switzerland. The Treaty of Turin restated the political neutrality of the strip of Savoy north of the frontier posts but south of Switzerland, the neutrality of that land, along with that of Switzerland itself, having already been agreed in 1815 under the terms of the Final Act of the Congress of Vienna.

The outcome of the plebiscite held in Savoy on 22 April was an overwhelming "Yes" to the question: "Does Savoy wish to be unified with France?" In northern Savoy, the accepted vote was "Yes and Zone", indicating acceptance of the duty-free zone with Switzerland. A similar public vote of support for French annexation had been achieved by plebiscite one week earlier in the County of Nice.

Logically, it should have been necessary for the outcome of the plebiscite to be known before the treaty could be signed off by the respective monarchs. The fact that the treaty was actually signed off a month before the plebiscite took place, the size of the majority supporting the treaty and the wording of the question used for the plebiscite were some of the factors giving rise to subsequent doubts about the conduct of the "popular consultation", which was carried out under the control of French police, since the Piedmontese army and police had already been withdrawn after the signature of the treaty.

== Text ==
Signed in Turin

24 March 1860

In the name of the Most Holy and indivisible Trinity, His Majesty the Emperor of the French having explained the considerations which, in consequence of the changes made in the territorial relationships between France and Sardinia, made him desire the annexation (réunion) of Savoy and of the arrondissement of Nice (circondario di Nizza) to France, and His Majesty the King of Sardinia having shown himself disposed to accede thereunto, their said Majesties have decided to conclude a treaty to that effect, and have named as their Plenipotentiaries: His Majesty the Emperor of the French, Baron de Talleyrand Périgord [...] and M. Benedetti [...]; and His Majesty the King of Sardinia, his Excellency Count Camille Benso de Cavour [...], and his Excellency the Chevalier Charles Louis Farini [...] who, having exchanged their full powers in due form, have agreed upon the following articles:–

Art. 1. His Majesty the King of Sardinia consents to the annexation (réunion) of Savoy and of the arrondissement of Nice (circondario di Nizza) to France, and renounces for himself and all his descendants and successors his rights and claims to the said territories. It is agreed between their Majesties that this réunion shall be effected without any constraint upon the wishes of the populations, and that the Governments of the Emperor of the French and of the King of Sardinia shall concert together as soon as possible on the best means of appreciating and taking note of (constater) the manifestations of those wishes.

Art. 2. It is also understood that His Majesty the King of Sardinia cannot transfer the neutralized portions of Savoy except upon the conditions upon which he himself possesses them, and that it will appertain to His Majesty the Emperor of the French to come to an understanding on that subject as well with the Powers represented at the Congress of Vienna as with the Helvetic Confederation, and to give them the guarantees which result from the stipulations alluded to in the present article.

Art. 3. A mixed commission will determine, in a spirit off equity, the frontiers of the two States, taking into account the configuration of the mountains and the necessity of defence.

Art. 4. One or more mixed commissions will be charged to examine and to resolve, within a brief delay, the divers incidental questions to which the annexation will give rise,–such as the decision of the contribution of Savoy and of the arrondissement of Nice to the public debt of Sardinia, and the execution of the obligations resulting from contracts entered into with the Sardinian Government, which, however, engages to terminate itself the works commenced for cutting a tunnel through the Alps (Mont Cénia).

Art. 5. The French Government will take into account, as regards functionaries of the civil and military order belonging by their birth to the province of Savoy, or to the arrondissement of Nice, and who will become French subjects, the rights which they have acquired by services rendered to the Sardinian Government; they will especially enjoy the benefits of life appointments in the magistrature and of the guarantees assured to the army.

Art. 6. Sardinian subjects originally of Savoy, or of the arrondissement of Nice, or domiciled actually in those provinces, who would wish to maintain the Sardinian nationality, will enjoy during the period of one year, dating from the exchange of the ratifications, and in virtue of a previous declaration made to the competent authorities, the faculty of removing their domicile to Italy, and settling there, in which case their qualifications as Sardinian citizens will remain to them. They will be at liberty to keep their landed property situate on the territory annexed to France.

Art. 7. For Sardinia the present treaty will become law as soon as the necessary legislative sanction has been given by the Parliament.

Art. 8. The present treaty shall be ratified and the ratifications exchanged at Turin within the delay of ten days, or earlier if possible.

In faith of which the respective Plenipotentiaries have signed it and affixed their seals thereunto.

Done in duplicate at Turin the 24th day of the month of March of the year of grace 1860.

TALLEYRAND.

BENEDETTI.

CAVOUR.

FARINI.

== Plebiscite ==
In March 1860, as Piedmont was in the process of annexing Emilia and Tuscany, Napoleon III agreed to sanction Piedmont's Italian acquisitions in exchange for Nice and Savoy. France annexed the provinces by the provisions of the Treaty of Turin, signed on 24 March 1860. There followed a deeply flawed plebiscite in Nice on 15 and 16 April and in Savoy on 22 and 23 April, in which "apparently and without any doubt" the vast majority of the inhabitants of the two territories voted to approve the treaty and join France. France took formal possession of Nice and Savoy on 12 June 1860. The vote was deeply influenced by the previous agreement between the Savoy-Piedmontese authorities and France, even making the Savoy authorities an active part in promoting a favorable result for France; for various reasons, many Niçards were excluded from the electoral lists, while there were enrolled many French specially transferred, and the operations took place under the control of the French authorities and with the presence in the city of French troops. Anywhere the voting took place freely, the results did not give rise to doubts: for example, 119 sailors from Nice, stationed on the Savoyard ships in the various ports, who could vote freely, expressed themselves as follows: 114 to remain in Italy and 5 to pass to France. This event caused the Niçard exodus, or the emigration of a quarter of the Niçard Italians to Italy, and the Niçard Vespers.

April 1860 Plebiscite
Territory	Date	Registered	Voters	For Annexation	Voting "Yes and Free Zone"	Against Annexation	Abstentions	Void (including pro-Swiss)	Army
Nice	15–16 April	30,712	25,933	25,743	-	160	4,779	30	-
Savoy	22–23 April	135,449	130,839	130,533	47,000	235	approx. 600	71	6,033 of 6,350
Sources : Henri Ménabréa - Paul Guichonnet for the figures for Savoy / General Council of the Alpes-Maritimes for the County of Nice.

By the treaty of 24 March 1860, it was agreed between France and Sardinia that Savoy and Nice, after the population had been consulted, should be ceded to France, and that Tuscany and the Romagna should also, after a similar consultation, be annexed to Sardinia. By the terms of the treaty the annexation of these respective territories was made no less advantageous to Victor Emmanuel II than to Napoleon. With Austria vindictive and powerful, and in a threatening strategic position; with Pope Pius IX outraged and desperate, and in control of an army which attached to itself a large share of the fanaticism of Europe, there was no hope for struggling Italy but in a firmer alliance with France. In this fact alone is to be found an explanation of the willingness of the Sardinian government to part with so considerable a portion of its territory. Reasons enough existed why the King and Emperor were equally anxious that the people should vote for annexation.

The fifth article of the Sardinian Constitution provided that treaties which should make any alteration in the territories of the State should not take effect until after they have obtained the consent of the Chamber. In view of this provision, it was manifestly the duty of the government to submit the treaty to the Chamber for ratification before the popular vote should be taken, inasmuch as it was only by virtue of the treaty that the people would be entitled to vote at all. But there were dangers in this method of procedure which the Sardinian government did not fail to foresee. The project of annexation was not popular in Parliament and was likely to fail. Giuseppe Garibaldi did not hesitate to raise his voice, in season and out of season, against it; and, what was of the greatest importance, as showing the untrammelled desires of the people most affected, "every one of the delegates from Nice and Savoy to Parliament had been elected with the express understanding that they were to protest against such a transfer to another power." In the short time that allowed of effort, thirteen thousand signatures were obtained to a protest against annexation. In view of these inconvenient facts, it was determined to postpone a ratification by Parliament until a popular vote, unanimous or nearly unanimous, had been secured. It seems to have been of no consequence that the treaty, according to which the vote was to be taken, really had no existence until it was ratified by the Chamber; it was determined, to proceed as though it had been ratified, and then to use the advantage gained by this procedure to secure its ratification.

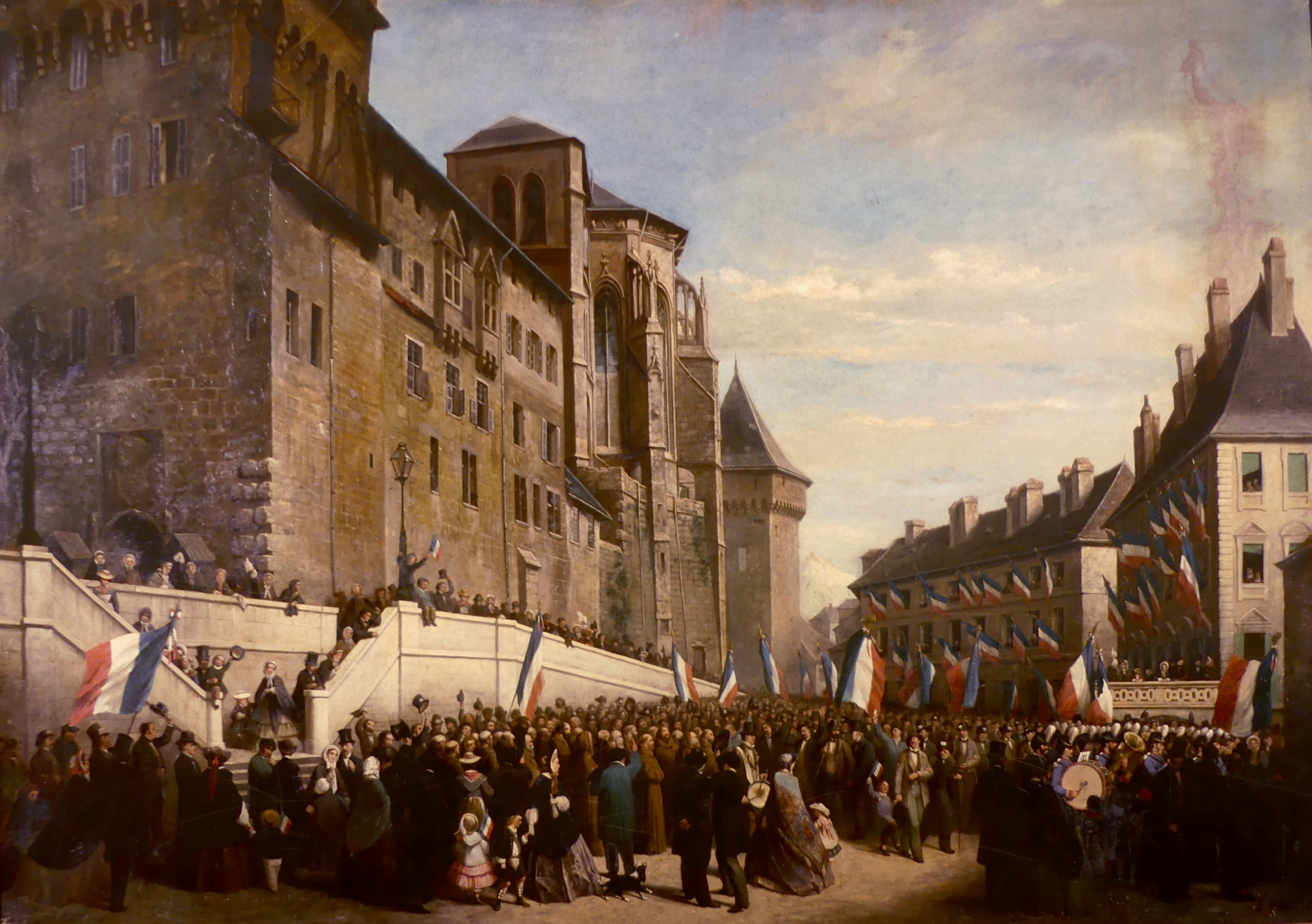
Citizens of Chambéry plebisciting the annexation of Savoy.

Accordingly, measures were instituted to secure such a popular vote as was desired. First of all, the Sardinian troops were withdrawn, and their places were filled by French garrisons. The opposition of the inhabitants of Nice to becoming French was indicated by the fact that the troops, on first entering the city, were received so roughly that they were obliged to resort to the use of the bayonet. The municipal junta sent a vote of thanks to those members of the British Parliament who had spoken in opposition to French annexation. The French Consul wrote to his government, that, if a French man-of-war did not come to Villa Franca, his own life and that of his family would not be secure. After the said ship arrived, the editor of the newly established French organ, L'Avenir de Nice, was besieged in his house, and obliged to rush down to Villa Franca for refuge.

Such were some of the indications of public sentiment at the time when the French garrisons were taking their places. It was evident that the people were not to be easily overawed.

But the efforts of the government had only just begun. Immediately after the occupation of the country by French troops, there was published an order transferring the civil government of the provinces to France. The French provisional governor, Lubonis, made haste to use the power thus placed in his hands for the advantage of his imperial master, and his example was speedily followed by Lachinal. Many of the mayors and local authorities were utterly opposed to the idea of French annexation, and without their co-operation it was felt that a vote of the people in favor of the measure could not be insured. Accordingly, the following circular, filled out as might in each case be required, was issued:

THE GOVERNOR OF ANNECY.

Considering that Monsieur ——— , mayor of the commune of ——— , seems not to have accepted favorably the consequences of the Treaty of the 24th of March last; considering that it is important, under the present circumstances, to have at the head of the administration of each commune men devoted to the new order of things;

It is decreed,

1. Monsieur ——— , present mayor of the commune of ———— , is dismissed from his functions.

2. The municipal counselor ——— is charged, until a new order, with the administration of said commune.

3. The above will be transmitted to Messieurs ——— and ——— , for their guidance.

(Signed) LACHINAL, Governor Regent.

Annecy, April, 1860.

In commenting upon this transfer of civil authority to the sole interests of the Emperor, the French journals gave evidence of abundant zeal. One of them, Le Bon Sens, remarked:

"A very important thing for the success of the great votation to which Savoy is about to be called is to have at the head of each commune a mayor thoroughly devoted to the French annexation, for it is he who should give the impulse and preside at the electoral operations. A mayor who is devoted to Piedmont, or having a Swiss leaning, will be altogether out of place on such an occasion. We learn with pleasure that a great purgation has already taken place in the province of Chambéry, of mayors, either hostile or suspected. We ask all sincere friends of France to keep a sharp look-out upon their communal administration. We do not doubt that the governor of the province of Annecy will be ready, if such is the case, to make use of the full powers with which he is clothed, to replace in each commune all the mayors who will not loyally co-operate in the great cause of our national regeneration."

The military and civil machinery thus in order, the authorities now devoted themselves to the more immediate work of manufacturing the requisite majority. First of all, the public was informed not only that it was prohibited to hold any meetings to discuss the affairs of Nice, but also that no canvassing on the part of those opposed to French annexation would be permitted, and that no placards or circulars would be allowed to be issued by the Italian party. At the same time, documents of various kinds were issued by the officers in authority, appealing to their subordinates and to the people. The provisional governor, Lubonis, issued a proclamation, of which the following is the most important portion:

"CITIZENS, All uncertainty with reference to our future has ceased. By the Treaty of the 24th of March, the gallant King Victor Emmanuel has ceded to France Savoy and the arrondissement of Nice. The most powerful motives of political necessity, the exigencies of the future of Italy, the sentiment of gratitude toward his powerful ally, and, finally, the exceptional circumstances of our country, have decided, although with regret, our beloved sovereign to separate the provinces which have been for so many centuries intimately bound up with his dynasty. But the fate of a people does not rest exclusively with the desire of princes. Therefore the magnanimous Emperor Napoleon the Third and the loyal Victor Emmanuel have desired that this Treaty of Cession should be strengthened by the popular adhesion... All opposition should fall powerless before the interests of the country and the sentiment of duty. Besides, it will find an insurmountable obstacle in the wishes themselves of Victor Emmanuel... Fellow-citizens, the mission which the King has confided to me is transitory but important. In order to fulfil my task at this extraordinary juncture, I count upon the support of your co-operation, upon your respect for law, and upon the high degree of civilization to which you have raised yourselves. Hasten, therefore, to confirm by your suffrages the reunion of your country to France. In making ourselves the echo of the intentions of the King, let us unfurl the banner of that noble and great nation which has always excited our lively sympathies. Let us rally round the throne of the glorious Emperor Napoleon the Third. Let us surround it with the same fidelity, so especial to our country, which we have always preserved to this day to Victor Emmanuel. As for this august Prince, let us retain among us the worship of bygone memories, and let us raise earnest prayers for his new and brilliant destiny. To the great Napoleon the Third, whose powerful and firm will is to open a new era of prosperity for our country, our inflexible fidelity, as well as our respectful devotion, will now commence.

Vive Ia France!

Vive L'Empereur Napoleon III!

Le Gouverneur Provisionnel, LUBONIS."

A proclamation similar to this of Lubonis was issued by Malaussena, Mayor of Nice; and finally, as if to crown all, the Bishop came forward in the same interest, appealing to all loyal members of the Church to vote for annexation. Nor, indeed, was this all. The French Committee sent to all the officials a circular bearing the government seal, and appealing for support to all the authorities in town and country. Referring to the advantages to be derived from annexation, the Committee used these words:

"We are convinced that the imperial government will recompense the people for the unanimity of their vote, and will proportion the reward according to the good disposition manifested by them. Without enumerating here the immense and incontestable advantages of every kind which our country would derive from its annexation to the great French Empire, we consider it our duty to address ourselves to all our friends and correspondents, not only to stimulate their zeal in favor of the common cause, and to engage them to use all their influence in order to insure the success of the vote in the French interest, but also that they may carefully watch and point out to us the steps that have been taken in a contrary interest by those in opposition, in order that the necessary measures may be taken to neutralize the influences which are hostile to the interests of the country. Will you have the goodness, M. ——— , to acknowledge the receipt of this, and to make known to us the spirit of your population, and that of the local authorities?"

The "necessary measures" to which the committee alluded were amply provided for. A sum of money had been placed at their disposal by the French government; and of this it is stated on good authority that 3,000,000 francs were used in the direct work of bribery, exclusive of the expenses of the government on the day of voting. Drinking booths and cafés were erected especially for the purpose by the officials, and a tri-colored cockade or a voting ticket with "oui" upon it entitled the bearer to the gratuitous enjoyment of all their privileges.

Another device which appealed to the religious zeal of the people was that of blessing the standards of the imperial party. This official blessing of the French flags was calculated to work an immense effect upon the ignorant and somewhat superstitious population. The authorization ran in this way:

"MM. les Commissaires will distribute the flags which MM. les Curés are authorized, and indeed invited, to bless. These standards will be in this case presented by the Commune, at the head of the inhabitants, to MM. les Curés, who will receive them at the entry of the church. Finally, you will understand the importance which I attach to this last recommendation. You will take care that official proclamations, manifestoes, and notices are preserved intact. All appeals to the passions—any notice whatever affixed without the required authorization—will be immediately torn down."

Side by side with this was posted the following official manifesto:

"The Mayor of Bonneville notifies that the Communal Council will assist at the benediction of the flags which the Imperial Government has presented to the Commune; that this religious ceremony will take place on Sunday, the 22nd, at seven o'clock, A. M.; that the cortège will leave the Hotel de Ville to go to the church. All electors are invited to this ceremony, which will immediately precede the opening of the voting-urns. In the morning the Hotel de Ville will be decorated with the French flags and the national colors. All the inhabitants are invited to decorate their houses with flags of the same colors.

"The Imperial Government has made its début by a signal benefit in giving us the customs zone, which has hitherto been refused. It assures to us the prosperity of the country. Its generosity will not end here. French engineers have explored the province, have begun to study the banks of the rivers, the state of the roads, and the public works most useful to the country. The numerous mines of Faucigny will be worked, the condition of our collége will be improved. Let us show our gratitude to the Emperor. Let us give a free course to our sympathies, so long restrained, and prove by a compact and unanimous vote that we are as much French as our fathers were.

Vive l'Empereur!

Vive la France!

(Signed) Dufour, Mayor."

As the day of voting approached, the Central Committee issued the following circular:

"SIR, The Central Annexationist Committee, upon whose proceedings no restrictions were placed, has named you member of the Special Committee for the parish of ———. You will have the goodness, sir, to concert with your colleagues, Messrs. ———, measures which may unite and bring to the poll on Sunday next the greatest possible number of electors, and take any steps which appear expedient, in order that the vote of the population may be at the same time a striking manifestation of its sentiments towards France and towards the Emperor."

In addition to all the other pressure, the local police authorities openly declared that lists of the proscrits would be made out, and that those who abstained from voting would be punished as soon as they became French subjects. The same authorities received orders from headquarters at Nice to collect the peasants on the day of voting and march them into town, with drums beating, and French flags floating at their head. An Englishman, who was at Nice at the time of the election, thus describes what he saw:

"The first object which met my view, as I entered Nice on the morning of the 15th, was a procession of country people marching into town. At the head of the procession was a fat curé, arm-in-arm with the village syndic and another functionary; behind were thirty or forty rustics, some of them extremely drunk, although early in the morning, carrying flags, beating drums, and cheering in a maudlin, irregular manner. The streets were crowded with persons wearing tri-colored cockades and carrying the oui voting-ticket in their hats. French soldiers, of whom there was a plentiful sprinkling, mingled freely with the crowd, although one battalion had been marched to Villa Franca, to give the authorities an opportunity of saying that, in order not to influence the vote, part of the French troops had left the town. The urns were placed in the National College, and thither I repaired to watch the process of voting. The people crowded in and voted with scarcely a challe.nge; lists of those registered were posted up outside; but at first the votes were given too rapidly to enable the scrutineers to exercise any check. The oui ticket was distributed freely in the streets; men stood at the corners as if they were advertising quack medicines, and gave you any number of "ouis", but I endeavored both in the shops and in the streets to procure a "non" without success. One boor I saw just about to vote two tickets. I asked him if such was his intention, and he naively answered, 'Why not?' 'Oh,' I said, 'it won't be fair; give me one' — which he most good-naturedly did at once. Another man to whom I spoke told me that he was strongly opposed to becoming French — that he had two sons in the Sardinian service, one in the army and the other in the navy, that he himself was a poor boatman, and that he had voted oui against his inclination, because the police had told him that if he did not he would be imprisoned, that the King whom he loved wanted it — that England and all the powers wanted it — and that as for his voting in the opposite sense he would simply get himself into a scrape and do no good. But he said promptly, 'I have neither cheered, nor will I wear a cockade.' As all the scrutineers were the nominees of Pietri (the French Agent of Police), and, as they held the keys of the urns, there was, of course, no security against any number of oui tickets being put into them in private."

The same witness wrote subsequently from Bonneville, where he happened to be on the day of the voting in Savoy:

"On the morning of the 22d I found myself once more at Bonneville in Faucigny; but a considerable change had taken place in the aspect of affairs since I had left it less than a month before. From every house, and almost every window of every house, waved French flags. The hotel, which had formerly been the headquarters of the anti-French party, and where I had dined with the members of the Committee, was tricked out in all the splendors of red, white, and blue. The booksellers shop, where I had heard sentiments strongly hostile to France, now displayed a gigantic banner; but, more remarkable than all, the house of the candidate who had contested Bonneville three weeks before on the Swiss interest, as opposed to the French, was now decorated with French flags. My old friends were nowhere to be found; the Committee had evaporated, and throughout the town where party feeling had recently run so high, and anti-French annexation was rampant and openly expressed, there was not a syllable to be heard against it. A little shopkeeper, whom I knew formerly as a furious anti-Frenchman, was now with difficulty dug out of his backshop, and owned to having just voted in favor of France as an act of self-preservation. 'What could I do?' said he; 'the concierge de la ville brought me two tickets this morning, with a message from the intendant that if I didn't vote them it would be the worse for me. He also asked where my French flag was, and advised me, if I valued my liberty, to show one without delay. There is the flag, and here is the other voting-ticket; a similar one I have just voted, but this I present to you."

'BULLETIN DE VOTATION.
La Savoie veut-elle être réunie à la France?
Oui et Zone.'

"My informant went on to tell me that every voter had received his ticket from the police authorities, and he smiled when I asked him where I could procure a non ticket. 'No printing-house here would venture to print one,' he said; 'you would have to get them from Geneva.' The addition of the word "Zone" struck me as curious, and I asked the object of its insertion in the voting-ticket. The device was ingenious. The authorities, fearing that though the people had not the courage to vote non they might be bold enough to abstain from voting at all, gave it to be understood that such a course would not prevent their being annexed, but that they would thereby lose their commercial zone or free frontier with Switzerland, upon which their future prosperity would depend; in other words, by voting they would be annexed and get their zone, by abstaining they would be equally annexed, but ruined. By a recent French circular I perceive it stated that the desire of the Emperor to carry out the conditions of neutrality, as laid down in the ninety-second article of the Treaty, has induced him to grant the Zone. It was originally invented as an election 'dodge', and served its purpose admirably, being used either as a bribe or as a threat."

Such were the means by which the hostility of Nice and Savoy to French annexation was converted into an almost unanimous declaration in its favor. Under any circumstances whatever such a spectacle of organized trickery would be a painful thing to contemplate. It is possible to imagine a situation in which the ruler of the nation, for political reasons, might submit a question that had already been decided to the ratification of his people with no other evil result than that which might chance to be inflicted upon the people themselves. But in the case of Savoy and Nice there was an element in the transaction which made it an outrage upon the liberal sentiment of Europe and of the world. We refer to the repeated declarations that the votation would be perfectly "free". The first article of the treaty declared that "it is understood between their Majesties that this re-union shall be effected without any constraint upon the will of the people, and that the government of the King of Sardinia and that of the Emperor of the French will agree as soon as possible upon the best means of arriving at and of confirming the manifestation of this will." Not long after the Treaty was formed, a deputation from Nice waited upon Victor Emmanuel, when he assured them "that he had stipulated as a condition of this cession a votation free from any external pressure, and promised that, if a military occupation took place, or if the condition was violated in any manner, he would protest"; and again, in the proclamation by which he released his subjects in Nice and Savoy from their allegiance, he gave them this assurance: "Under no circumstances will this great change in your destiny be imposed upon you; it must be the result of your free consent. Such is my firm determination; such also is the intention of the Emperor of the French." Finally, in the Chamber of Deputies, when the vigorous protest of Garibaldi seemed likely to put an end to the whole transaction, confidence was restored only when Count Cavour assured the deputies that the vote should be absolutely free (pienamente libero). And yet, in view of all these most solemn assurances, what have we seen? Italian troops removed and French troops put in their places; all the important civil offices filled with Frenchmen, or men committed to the support of the French cause; official circulars and placards advocating annexation scattered everywhere, while no publication of an opposing sentiment was anywhere allowed; ballot-boxes in exclusive control of French officers; ballots in favor of annexation distributed everywhere by the police, while ballots opposed to annexation could be procured only by sending to Geneva; priests blessing the flags presented by the Emperor, and appealing to the consciences of their people in behalf of France; money, as well as general free living and drinking, furnished by the imperial agents; and, finally, the people, with French music sounding and French banners flying, marched up en masse to the ballot-box, with priest and mayor arm-in-arm at their head. Such was the boasted "free vote" with the sanction and help of which Nice and Savoy were annexed to France.
