= Treaty of Turin (1816) =

1816 treaty between Sardinia and Switzerland

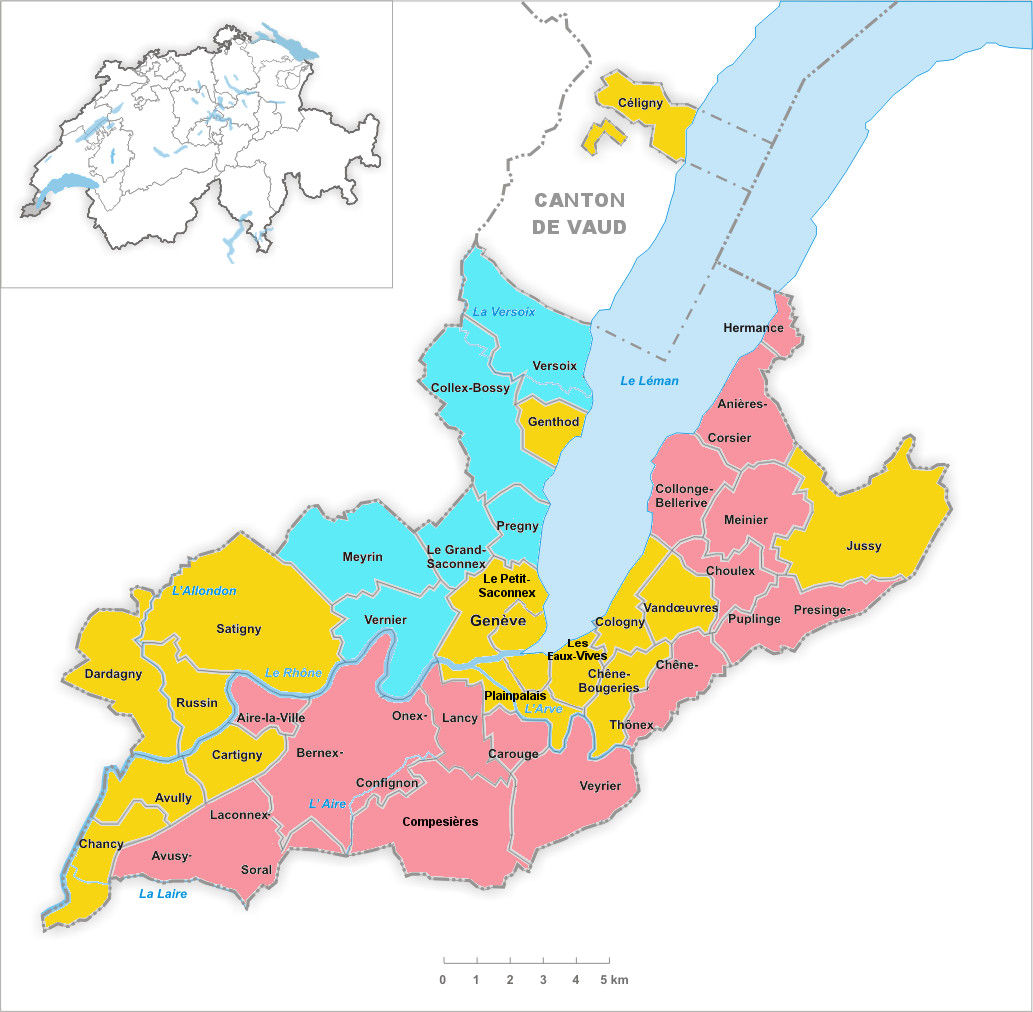
- Expansion of the Canton of Geneva. Yellow-Pre 1815; Blue-Congress of Vienna (1815); Pink-Treaty of Turin (1816)
- Type: bilateral treaty
- Signed: 16 March 1816
- Location: Turin, Italy
- Negotiators: (Switzerland) Pictet de Rochemont (Sardinia) Montiglio, (Sardinia) Collegno
- Original signatories: Kingdom of Sardinia, Switzerland

The 1816 Treaty of Turin was a treaty between Switzerland and the Kingdom of Sardinia which expanded the Canton of Geneva.

== Background ==
In 1814 the Swiss Confederation accepted Geneva's proposal to join the Confederation. At that time, it only covered a total of 124 square kilometers (48 sq mi) (about 44% of its modern size) and had only 14 of the 45 current municipalities. Additionally, Geneva city and its three neighbors, Vandoeuvres, Chêne-Bougeries and Cologny were isolated from the remaining municipalities and from the rest of Switzerland. Only the isolated municipality of Céligny (which today is an exclave in the Canton of Vaud) was connected to the rest of the country. Before the canton could join Switzerland, it needed a land connection to the rest of the country and continuous borders.

Tasked with gaining support from the Great Powers for Geneva joining Switzerland and gaining needed territory, the diplomat Charles Pictet de Rochemont was dispatched from Geneva to the Congress of Vienna and Paris. At the Congress of Vienna, Pictet de Rochemont was able to gain support for Geneva joining the country which it did in mid 1815. At the Second Paris Peace Talks, he was able to secure a strengthened acknowledgement of Swiss neutrality, a reparation of 3 million francs and part of the Pays de Gex along the northern shore of Lake Geneva. On 20 November 1815 the municipalities of Versoix, Collex-Bossy, Bellevue, Pregny-Chambesy, Le Grand-Saconnex, Meyrin and Vernier became part of the Canton of Geneva. These new communities expanded the canton by 49 km^{2} (19 sq mi) and 3,343 residents.

The 1815 treaties indicated that the Kingdom of Sardinia should give Switzerland a 25 km (16 mi) strip of land along the south shore of Lake Geneva and lands around Mount Salève. However, the exact boundaries and a schedule were left up to the two nations. Additionally, beginning in 1792 the French revolutionary government had established tariffs on all goods, including food, going into the city which forced Geneva to accept annexation in 1798. For this reason the government wanted to gain additional farm land and establish trade treaties with their neighbors.

== Treaty of Turin ==
In January 1816 Pictet de Rochemont met with Montiglio and Collegno in Turin to begin negotiating the exact borders. Pictet de Rochemont sought to connect the community of Jussy with the rest of the canton. Sardinia wanted to keep Mount Salève and the Salève road between Faucigny and Chablais, which would prevent linking with Jussy. They eventually compromised with Geneva receiving the lake shore as far east as Hermance and over to Thônex, but giving the Salève area and road as well as the community of Saint-Julien-en-Genevois to Sardinia.

Once these issues were settled, the treaty was nearly ready to sign. However, in early March the government of Geneva refused to sign the treaty over a pair of issues. The first dealt with the status, lodging and payments to the curia of the Catholic Church. The other was over the wording in Article VII, which dealt with the neutrality of the lands which Sardinia ceded to Switzerland. Both concerns were eventually addressed and on 16 March 1816 the treaty was signed. The treaty added a total of 24 new municipalities, 109 km^{2} (42 sq mi) and 12,700 new residents to the canton.

The treaty established a customs free zone in what became the French district of Haute-Savoie, which included about 151 km^{2} (58 sq mi) of Sardinian land added to lands in the Arrondissement of Gex from 1815 for a total of about 540 km^{2} (210 sq mi) of free trade zones. Despite an attempt in 1919 by the French government to dissolve the free trade zones around Geneva, the International Court in The Hague ruled that these zones were still protected by the treaties. In 1998 these free trade zones imported about SFr 47.3 million, while SFr 2.3 million worth of goods were exported.
