= Chablais =

Province of the Duchy of Savoy

Coordinates: 46.36°N 6.49°E

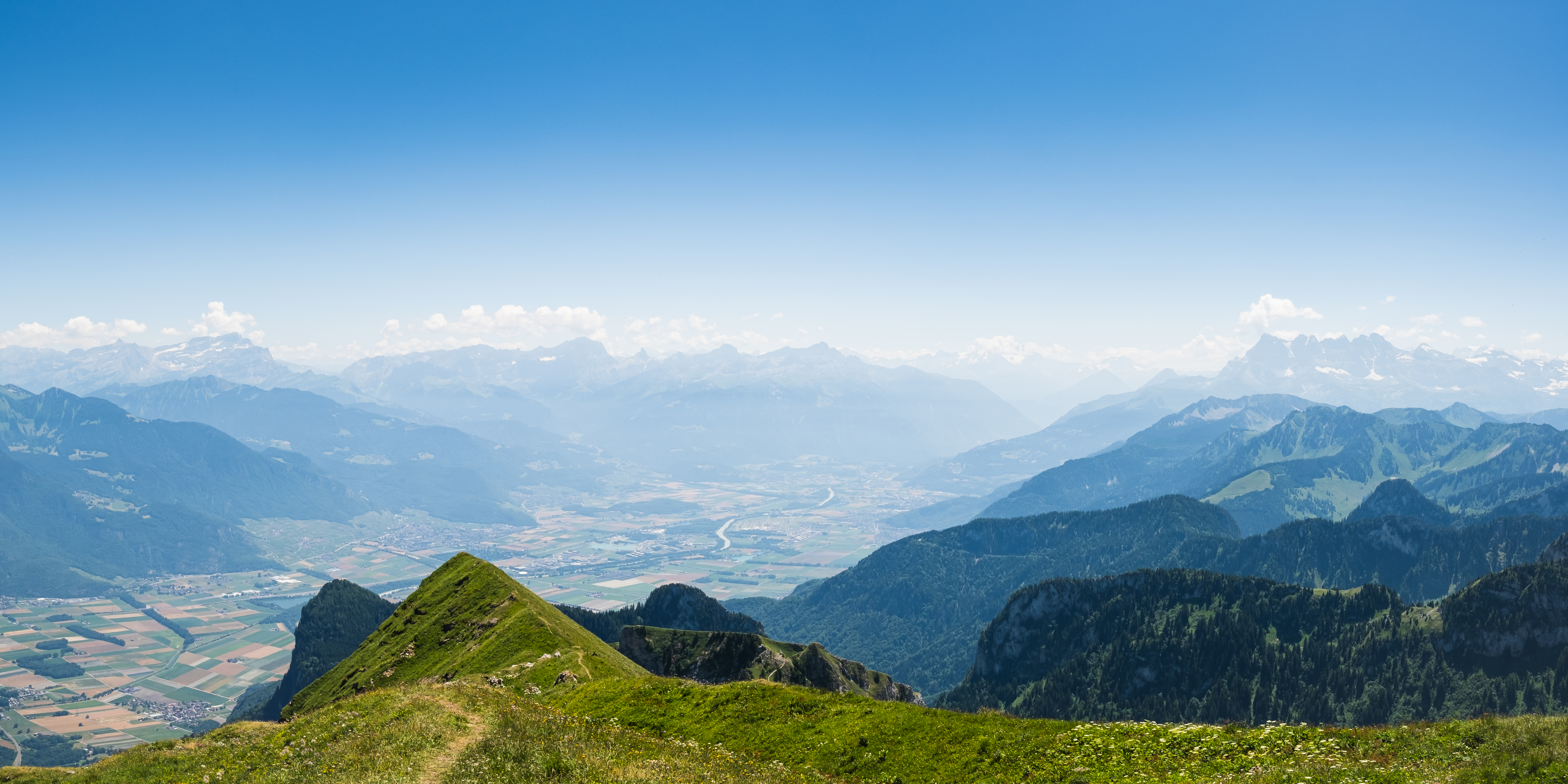
The Swiss Chablais as seen from Le Grammont

The Chablais (French: [ʃablɛ]; Savoyard: Chablès; Italian: Chiablese) was a province of the Duchy of Savoy. Its capital was Thonon-les-Bains.

The Chablais was elevated to a duchy in 1311 by Henry VII, Holy Roman Emperor.

This region is currently divided into three territories, the Chablais savoyard, the Chablais valaisan, and the Chablais vaudois, and is now split across two countries: France (department of Haute-Savoie) and Switzerland (cantons of Valais and Vaud). The Chablais Alps is a mountain range situated between the two countries, but the Chablais region itself also includes a large portion of the Vaud Alps and the Rhône Valley from Saint-Maurice, Switzerland, to Lake Geneva.

The Swiss section of the Chablais is served by the Transports Publics du Chablais (TPC) with buses and narrow gauge railways operating out of Aigle and Bex to service the communities in the region.

Chablais is also a wine appellation (AOC) associated with the Chablais vaudois. The sub-appellations, Villeneuve, Yvorne, Aigle, Ollon-Vaud and Bex, are all situated in the district of Aigle. The district is mostly known for the white wines it produces using the Chasselas grape, referred to locally as "Fendant".

The title of Duke of Chablais became a title for a cadet Prince of the Royal House of Savoy.

== Sources ==
- Cox, Eugene L. (1967), The Green Count of Savoy, Princeton, New Jersey: Princeton University Press, LCCN 67-11030
