= History of Savoy from 1860 to 1914 =

French period

The History of Savoy from 1860 to 1914 covers the period when the former Duchy of Savoy joined the French nation. This followed the signing of the Treaty of Turin in March and the plebiscite of April; Savoy officially became part of France on June 14, 1860. This transition to French authority occurred without difficulties. Although some tensions arose in the aftermath of the annexation, the Savoyards did not appear to question the decision made by their princes—even on the eve of World War I. Beyond administrative integration, the people of Savoy had to face—both economically and culturally—the changes brought about by the industrial transformations of the late 19th century.

== Under the Second Empire ==
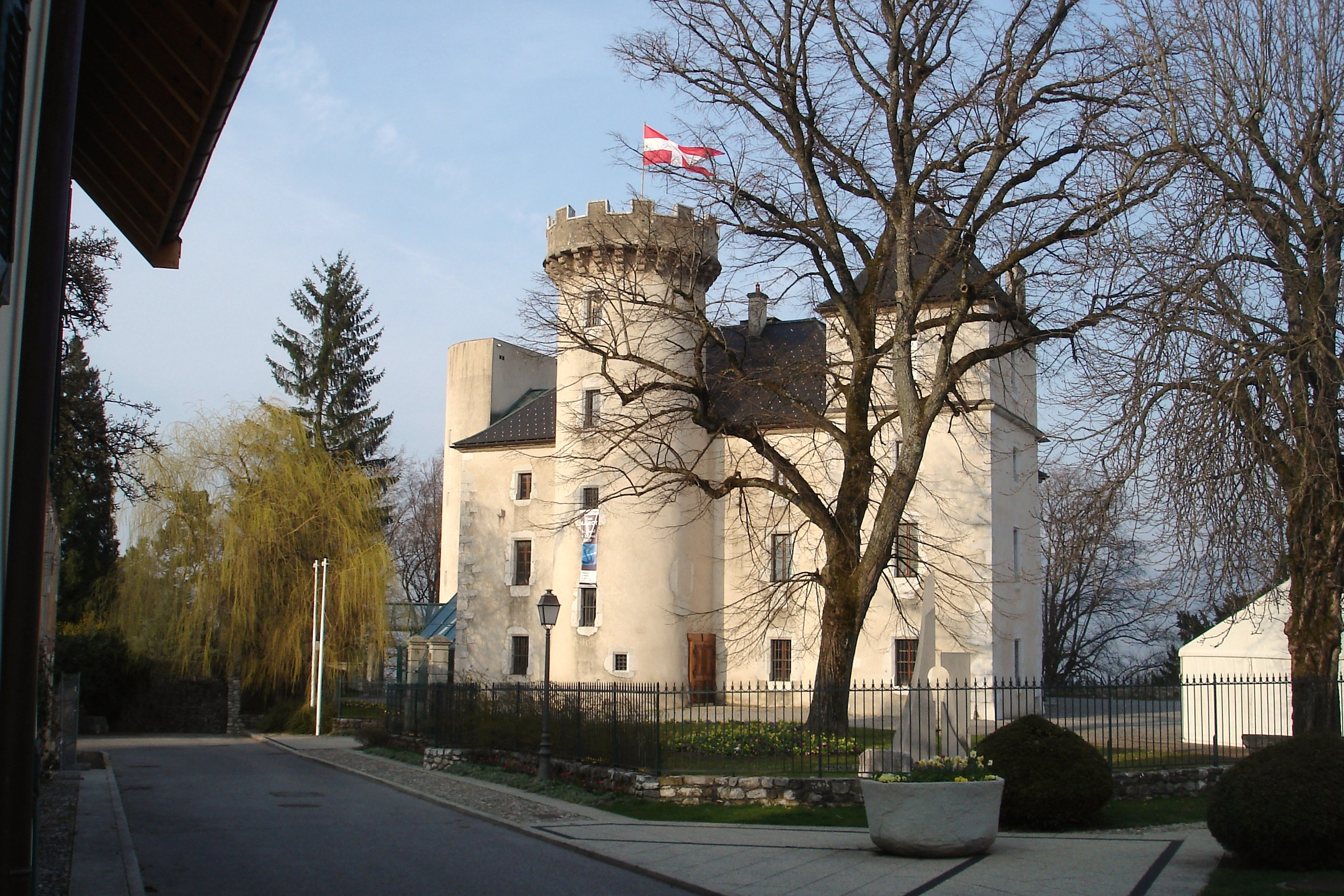
The imperial couple were received in La Roche-sur-Foron on August 31, 1860.

On June 14, 1860, the Duchy of Savoie officially joined the French Empire. On June 15, it was divided into two departments: Savoie and Haute-Savoie. From August 27 to September 5, the imperial couple made a journey through the Savoyard lands, visiting: Chambéry (August 27), Aix-les-Bains (August 29), Annecy with a gondola ride on the lake (August 30), a carriage tour of La Roche-sur-Foron (August 31), then Saint-Julien-en-Genevois and Thonon, heading to Évian-les-Bains by boat, then Sallanches (September 2), and the approach to the mountains from Chamonix with a muleback ascent of Montenvers and the crossing of the Mer de Glace. "Wherever the sovereigns appeared in a brilliant procession, they received a triumphant welcome."

=== June–December 1860 ===
Integration was achieved through the swift implementation of royal services (administration, justice, police). To govern the two new French departments, Hippolyte Dieu and Gustave-Léonard Pompon-Levainville assumed their roles as prefects of Savoie and Haute-Savoie after swearing allegiance to Emperor Napoleon III on June 14, 1860. The latter was quickly replaced by a Parisian Savoyard, Anselme Pétetin. Of the six sub-prefects, four were Savoyards. In religious matters, changes proceeded more slowly. The four dioceses of Chambéry, Tarentaise, Maurienne, and Annecy were retained despite not aligning with the French ecclesiastical divisions or the legislation of the Concordat of 1801. There was talk of suppressing two of them and leaving those bishoprics vacant.

In 1860, Chambéry had a “university institute” (founded ten years earlier) affiliated with Turin, which offered courses in law, medicine, theology, pharmacy, geometry, physics, and mechanics. However, a decree of October 24, 1860, removed these. Only Annecy had a state-run college. To reduce clerical influence in Chambéry, an imperial high school was inaugurated. To provide education there, it was necessary to recruit teachers and instructors from eastern France. The Académie de Chambéry, encompassing the two Savoyard departments, was created by imperial decree on June 13, 1860. Charles Zervot was appointed rector.

A French-style chamber of commerce and industry was inaugurated in Chambéry at the same time as in Nice, in 1861, following the imperial decree of December 5, 1860. According to Article 2, it comprised “twelve members.” In 1862, members of the Saint-Nicolas Brotherhood founded the Mutual Aid Society to cover medical and pharmaceutical expenses for sick or injured workers. From August 10 to 20, 1863, Chambéry hosted the 30th Scientific Congress of France, focusing on archaeology and art objects, organized by Marquis Charles-Albert Costa de Beauregard at the city’s Palace of Justice.

On the judicial level, the decree of June 12, 1860, made the penal and procedural laws existing in France applicable in Savoy. The law of June 23, 1860, stipulates in its Article 3 that “the departments of Savoy and Haute-Savoie form the jurisdiction of an imperial court whose seat is in Chambéry.” Historically, the maintenance of the appellate court in Chambéry—which had succeeded the Senate of Savoy in 1848—was the necessary condition for the successful outcome of the 1860 plebiscite. The opponents of annexation based their argument on the abolition of the court of appeal. To guarantee the results of the plebiscite, Napoleon III, represented by the Minister of Justice in France, committed to maintaining the existence of the court: There would then exist only two courts of appeal in France; the Court of Cassation and that of Chambéry. The latter was entrusted to Prosecutor General Charles Alfred Millevoye. Moreover, for the management of private affairs, the Sardinian codes were maintained. However, despite a smooth process, certain disputes would arise.

The 383 Savoyard military officers, well integrated into the Sardinian army, were required to choose between France and Italy. Most of them opted for Italy, motivated by career ambition and loyalty to King Victor Emmanuel II of Savoy. The decision was heart-wrenching for many of them; the majority of these officers, torn between two homelands and facing an uncertain career, would find in Imperial France only painful disillusionment and limited promotion, marred by prejudice. Yet, Articles 5 and 6 of the Treaty of Turin, signed on March 24, 1860, had promised to preserve the acquired Sardinian rights if citizen-soldiers chose French nationality and joined the French army. The Savoy Brigade, which wished to remain within the Imperial Army as a brigade of Savoyard volunteers, became the 103rd Line Infantry Regiment. The regiment was dissolved on January 15, 1862, and the Savoyard officers were incorporated into and dispersed among various units of the French army. Hubert Heyriès notes in his article that "Fifty-eight officers (12%) [who chose to remain in the Piedmontese army] became generals, while only three officers (Jean-François Borson, Charles Goybet, and Auguste de Ville) ended their careers with the rank of general in France, a sign that integration into France was more difficult.”

The abandoned barracks were occupied by 53 former carabiniers of Savoyard origin, who were integrated into the “Company of Savoy”, composed of 92 non-commissioned officers, brigadiers, and gendarmes.

From 1860 to 1870, mayors and municipal deputies were appointed by the Emperor in the chief towns of departments, arrondissements, and cantons, as well as in communes with a population equal to or greater than 3,000 inhabitants, rather than being elected by their peers. In the other communes, they were appointed by the prefect. (Note: Provisions contained in the municipal law of May 5, 1855. General Council of Savoy: Departmental Archives Directorate: Numerical directory of series M by J. Chapas and D. Collomb - IR 1203. Elections.)

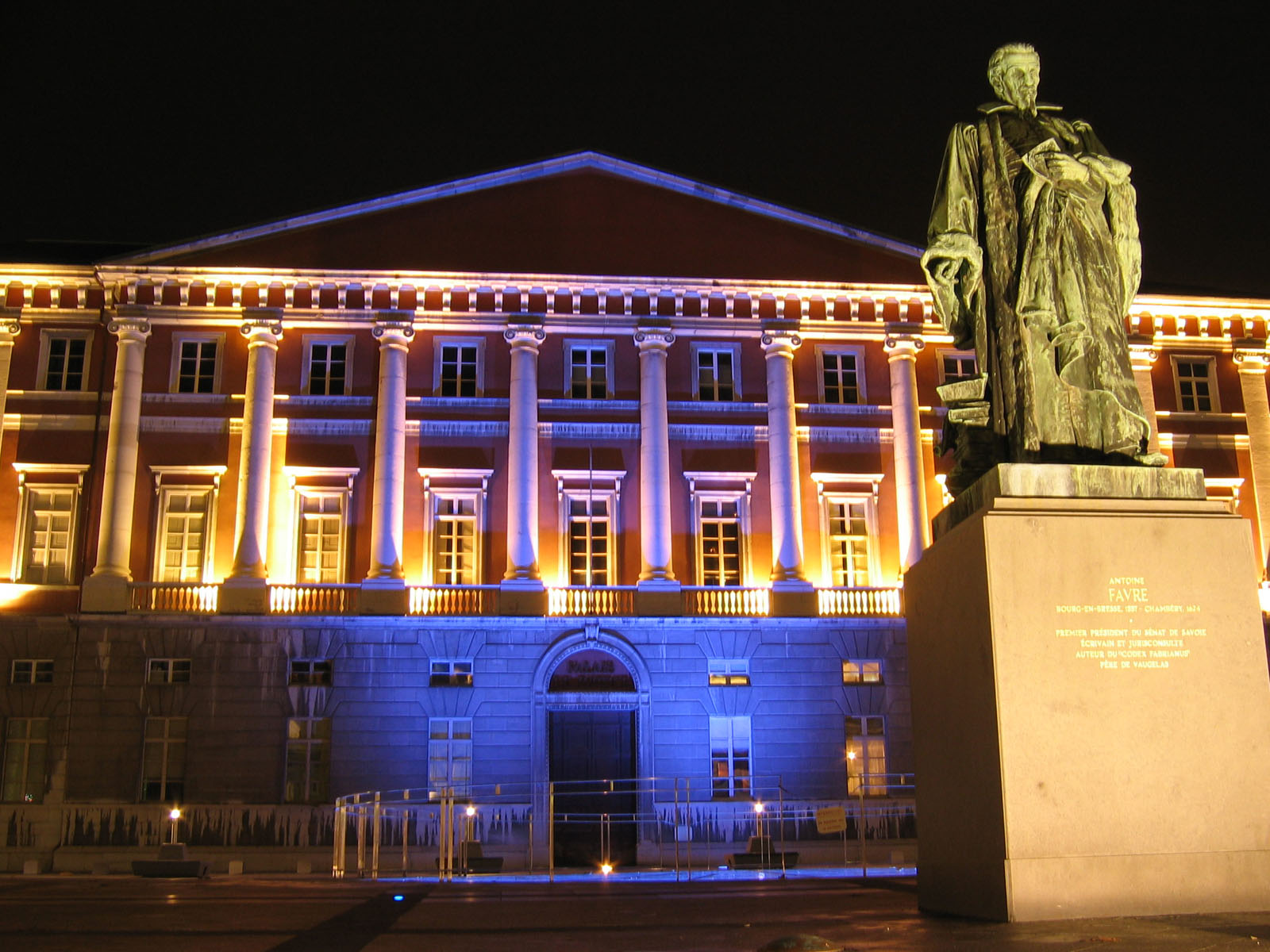
Chambéry courthouse, completed in 1859. In the foreground, the monument dedicated to President Favre

The first elections by universal male suffrage for deputies took place on December 9 and 10. Amédée Greyfié de Bellecombe and Ernest de Boigne (descendant of Benoît de Boigne) represented Savoy, while Hippolyte Pissard and Anatole Bartholoni represented Haute-Savoie.

=== 1861–1871: discontent without rejection of the plebiscite ===
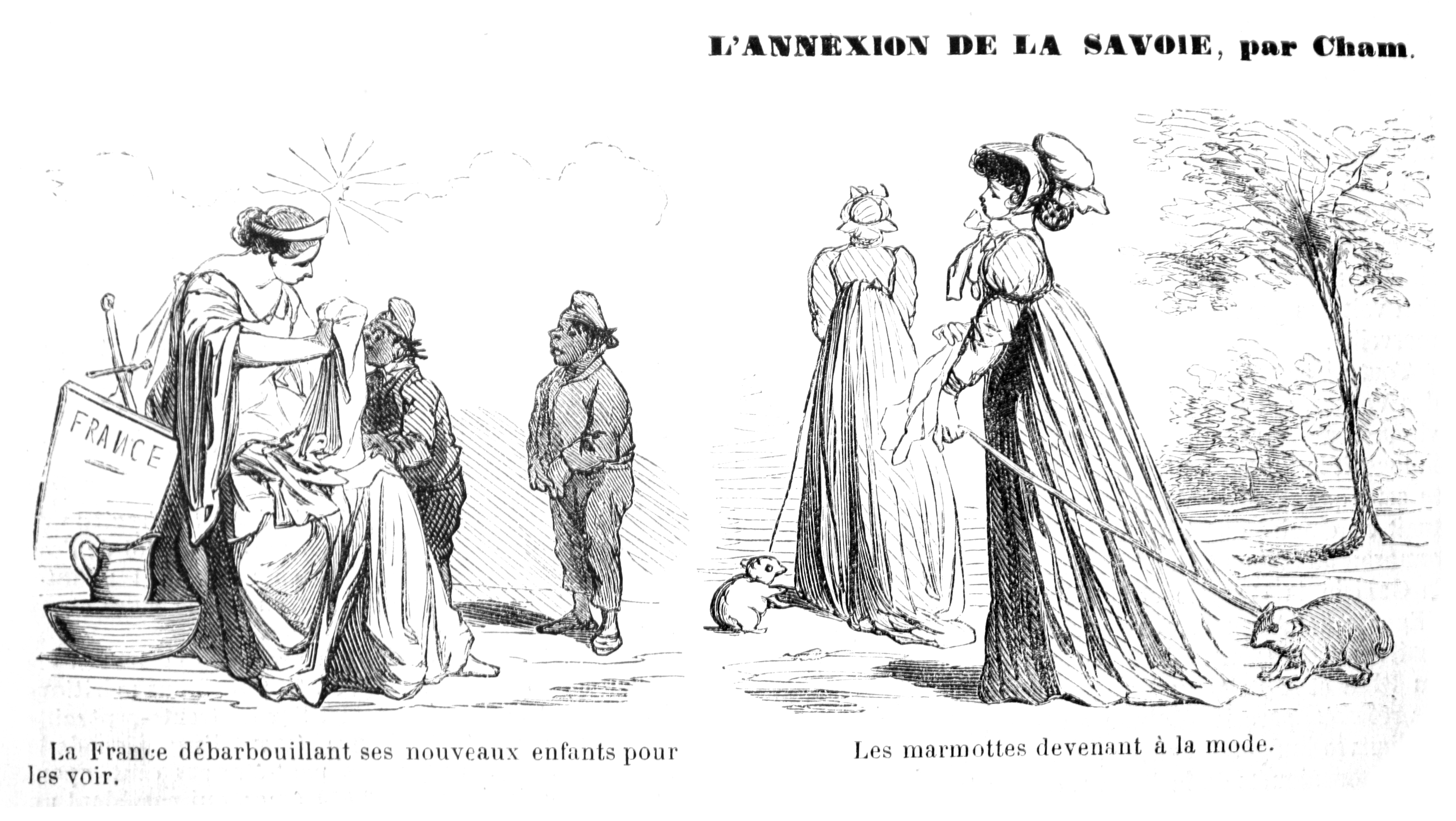
Cartoon by Cham depicting the integration of Savoy into France, published in the Journal universel L'Illustration, June 30, 1860

Old Savoy is dead. The uniformity of Parisian fashion replaces the originality of national customs. The provincial life of old is nothing more than a memory. We are becoming nobodies, when we used to be somebody.

— François Descotes (1846–1908, conservative politician), in 1902

The reflection of the Chambéry lawyer expresses the sentiment of part of the population during the period. After the initial moments following the annexation, Savoyards felt that their destiny was slipping away from them. Without challenging integration into France, some measures of the imperial administration were not completely understood.

The first disconnect occurred between the new French civil servants and the local population. Savoyards thought they would obtain control over their territory, whereas the French administrative model favored the rotation of civil servants, a principle meant to prevent the development of local clientelism. The misunderstanding stemmed from the image that the French had of the Savoyards. Caricatures in weekly publications—L’Illustration, Le Monde illustré, Le Charivari—such as the Cham caricature nearby, depicted Savoy as a backward place needing to be civilized and opened up. “These gentlemen were convinced that Italian was spoken there and that even the most basic items, such as candles, were lacking.” Some civil servants even arrived in Savoy with a French–Italian dictionary, unaware that Savoy had produced French-language authors like François de Sales, Marc-Claude de Buttet, and Vaugelas. (Note: The anti-annexationist author, Jean de Pingon, states in his book de Pingon 1996, pp. 76–77: “A French official arriving in Savoy the day after the annexation was surprised to hear the Savoyards speaking French. He then asked a peasant: 'But tell me, what language did you speak before you were French?' And the peasant replied: 'Before we were French, Sir, we didn’t speak.'") Moreover, the term “Savoyard,” beyond designating the region's inhabitants, had become synonymous with “rustic.” (Note: The term savoyard during this period took on a pejorative, popular, and rustic connotation. Thus, dictionaries like Le Littré or Le Lachâtre reflect this usage. The Dictionnaire universel, Panthéon historique, littéraire et encyclopédie illustrée (1855) states: "This term particularly refers to chimney-sweeps, whitewashers, and flue cleaners who come in bands every year from Savoy. Figuratively and familiarly, it means coarse, dirty, and uneducated: What a Savoyard!") The Savoyard citizens exploited this situation by delaying administrative processes, hoping to exhaust their new interlocutors.

From a political standpoint, there was quick dissatisfaction with the province’s low representation at the national level. Most of the elite—composed of aristocratic nobility or notables, mainly legal professionals rather than industrialists—withdrew from political life. Napoleon III’s Roman policy irritated Savoyards, particularly conservatives, prompting Deputy Amédée Greyfié de Bellecombe to resign—yet this did not call into question the new loyalty to the Empire. Meanwhile, republicans and left-wing figures were represented in Savoy, despite a breakthrough during the 1869 elections and the emergence of anticlericalism (cf. infra). During the May 8, 1870 plebiscite, Savoy voted “yes” at 80%.

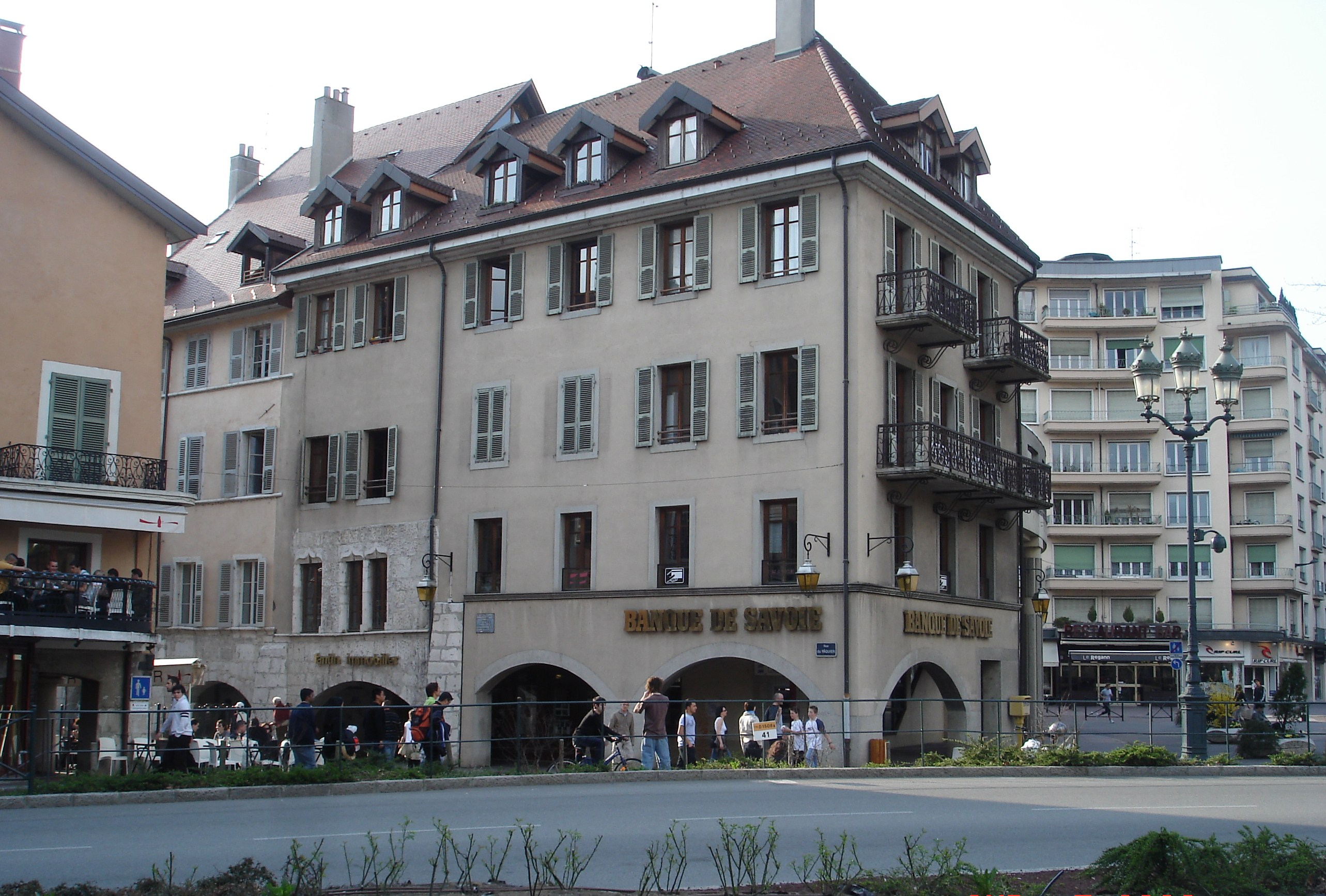
Bank of Savoy

Disappointments also occurred—and especially so—in the economic sphere (see section A Traditional Society below), particularly with the bankruptcy of the Bank of Savoy and many local banks. The Bank of Savoy was a banking institution created on April 26, 1851, in Annecy, and remained relatively small. Following the agreements of the annexation, there was an orientation toward maintaining the Banque de Savoie, with the privilege of issuing banknotes and coins. However, the question of the Bank of France’s monopoly on issuing banknotes quickly arose, as well as the possibility of merging the two banks. Nevertheless, the Banque de Savoie delayed negotiations and demanded a very high price for the purchase of its rights. At the same time, the Pereire brothers sought to form a partnership with the Savoyard bank in order to compete nationwide with the Banque de France. The government prohibited this association and placed the Banque de Savoie under sequestration, which led to its bankruptcy, as well as that of seven other local banking institutions (mainly in Haute-Savoie).

The union with France caused a decrease in the number of schools, particularly in the various mountain hamlets (1,854 schools in 1849, only 1,641 in 1872). However, this restructuring did not result in a drop in school enrollment—on the contrary. The number of schoolchildren rose from 75,728 to 96,628. Although the literacy rate is not known for this period, “in 1848, out of 100 Savoyards over the age of 15, 40 were illiterate; that is, around 30% in the mountains, and up to 50% in the lowlands.” At the same time in Paris, it is estimated that 85% of men and 75% of women knew how to read.

=== A traditional society ===
The annexation of Savoy to France led to an altered economy. Predominantly rural, the Savoyard economy struggled to withstand the opening of its market to French, Belgian, or even British goods. Cheap products flooded the two departments, leading to an economic crisis across various sectors. At the time of the vote, the Savoyards had hoped for a rapid improvement of the local economy through better markets and industrialization, expecting this would bring an improved standard of living.

==== Agriculture ====
Savoy was primarily peasant-based, with agricultural holdings organized around cooperatives, which inevitably declined after the Annexation. Isolation and lack of capital prevented these farms from modernizing or diversifying, despite encouragement from the local press. Newspapers such as Le Propagateur, Le Savoyard, La Tarentaise, and Le Léman organized exchanges, contests, and fairs with major cities in the region, like Lyon and Grenoble.

In 1862, small farms mostly grew wheat, buckwheat, maslin, hemp, and potatoes. High-altitude vineyards had poor yields, despite producing wines from prestigious grapes such as Mondeuse, Persan (rare), and Roussette-de-Savoie (rare). Currently, with half the vineyard surface area, the same yield is achieved as in 1862 (7,100 hectares instead of 18,355 hectares).

The French Water and Forests Administration led a vigorous and necessary reforestation policy for the region. By 1876, forested land—mainly spruce—had increased in Haute-Savoie from 100,000 to 160,000 hectares over a century, which is 36% of the department’s surface area. Since forest rangers were no longer under the influence of local communes, minor infractions, and wandering livestock in the forests disappeared, which helped better protect forest heritage as well as the ecosystems associated with forests. The Faucigny mule, much appreciated for its robust and mountainous qualities, was sold in Spain and Portugal. This mule, used to carry hay or grapes during harvests, could transport a volume of around 150 liters called a chavalée (a word made from the dialect tsa: pasture, and vala: value). In 1868, Théophile Gautier noted, during his journey from Chamonix to Martigny, that the route could be traveled on foot (ten to thirteen hours) or on muleback (eight hours), but that the road was becoming accessible to carts starting at the Tête Noire.

The attempts to introduce the Tarine cows took place under a cloud of uncertainty. The few specimens brought without preparation to the Lyon exhibition in 1861 gave the impression of animals with prominent bones and dull coats. This strange breed reappeared at the Moulins competition in 1862, where it was successful thanks to well-fattened animals. The name Tarine breed was proposed at the Moûtiers competition in 1863. Officially recognized in 1864, it especially boosted sales in the southern department, where animals used for both labor and dairy needed to show resilience and frugality.

— Jacques Lovie, La Vraie Vie de tous les jours en Savoie romantique, 1815-1860

==== Economy situation ====
One of the main priorities was to connect Savoie to the rest of the country. Until 1915, France developed its railway network. Chambéry was connected to Grenoble in 1864 and to Lyon in 1884. The line was extended to Annecy two years later. The completion of the Mont-Cenis railway tunnel, begun in 1857 under the direction of Germain Sommeiller, in 1871, allowed a second railway line to become a major European axis, linking France to Italy. Elsewhere in Savoie, the railway reached Albertville on October 27, 1879, Moûtiers on June 1, 1893, and Bourg-Saint-Maurice on November 20, 1913. Most of the other lines were completed during this period.

Economic integration was just as slow. The development of transportation must be understood in connection with the mountainous terrain. Savoyards, who expected to find a new market for their agricultural products, were instead faced with competition from other rural regions of France. The signing of a trade agreement with England favored English imports, which were cheaper than French products. However, the rights granted through the duty-free zone with Switzerland were sufficient to limit agricultural competition in the northern part of Haute-Savoie. Conversely, the Savoyard industry struggled to survive. For instance, the Annecy factory, which employed between 1,200 and 1,400 workers in 1848, had only 560 workers left after the annexation. Of the 67 nail makers once found in the Bauges region, only 14 remained by 1872. However, starting from April 1, 1863, to avoid penalizing the already weakened industry in the area, the benefit of franchise credits was abolished. Meanwhile, the textile sector, supported by industrialists from Lyon, managed to hold on—especially in Chambéry with gauze, in Faverges (Note: Silk factories were founded by Jean-Pierre Duport in 1814 and Baron Jules Blanc around 1820.) and Yenne with silk, and Annecy with cotton.

The banking sector, however, did not survive. The case of the bank of Savoy and its bankruptcy led to a weakening of the local banking system, eventually resulting in its collapse. (Note: François Neyret in Faverges in 1878, Victor-François Pétellat in Rumilly in 1882, De Rochette and Co. in Annecy in 1883, Les Alpes in Sallanches in 1886, Léon Ducret in Rumilly in 1892, the Comptoir d’Escompte in Annecy in 1893, Les Fils de H. Pinget in Thonon in 1906. (de Pingon 1996, pp. 58–59))

Many commercial and industrial businesses also filed for bankruptcy following these bank failures, such as the tannery of Saint-Bon-Tarentaise and Craste Pasta of Thonon-les-Bains.

=== Political life ===
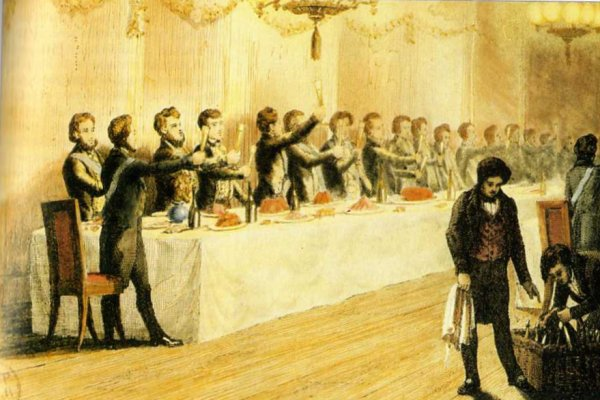
Masonic banquet in France, circa 1840

The Masonic lodge “La Réunion” in Chambéry, affiliated with the Grand Orient de France, brought Masonic activity in the Sardinian duchy to an end around 1815, and it remained dormant until the annexation of Savoie in 1860. Toward the end of 1864, Chambéry’s first lodge, “La Renaissance,” established a second lodge, “L’Espérance Savoisienne.” These two Masonic lodges were closely monitored by the French authorities and were eventually banned by a prefectural decree on September 23, 1877. The Chambéry lodge, which promoted liberal ideas in 1864, included members from all social classes (workers, artisans, merchants, entrepreneurs, and liberal professionals) and displayed a certain disdain for political life. In response to rising worker hardship and growing unemployment, the lodges organized soup distributions in schools, managed by a food cooperative funded by the Espérance Savoisienne lodge (a successor to the Trois Mortiers lodge, the oldest in Chambéry), and La Renaissance in Bonneville and Sallanches. In 1869, the streets of Chambéry were filled with destitute people, pursued by the police.

The Quanta Cura, an encyclical by Pope Pius IX, written to condemn the main political and religious errors of the 19th century, was banned in December 1864, leading to unrest within the religious community in Savoy. The increase in military presence also triggered strong concern among the working class. Political gatherings began to instill fear, with some politicians advocating for preparedness in case of danger. The 1869 election confirmed the rise of the Republican Party, with the election of Nicolas Parent in Chambéry (whose program included complete freedom, decentralization of government and administration, reduction of high salaries, and education for the masses) and Jules Philippe in Annecy. Public meetings spoke of the government's wrongdoings, and the liberal newspaper Le Patriote praised anticlericalism and antimilitarism.

=== 1870 war in Savoy ===
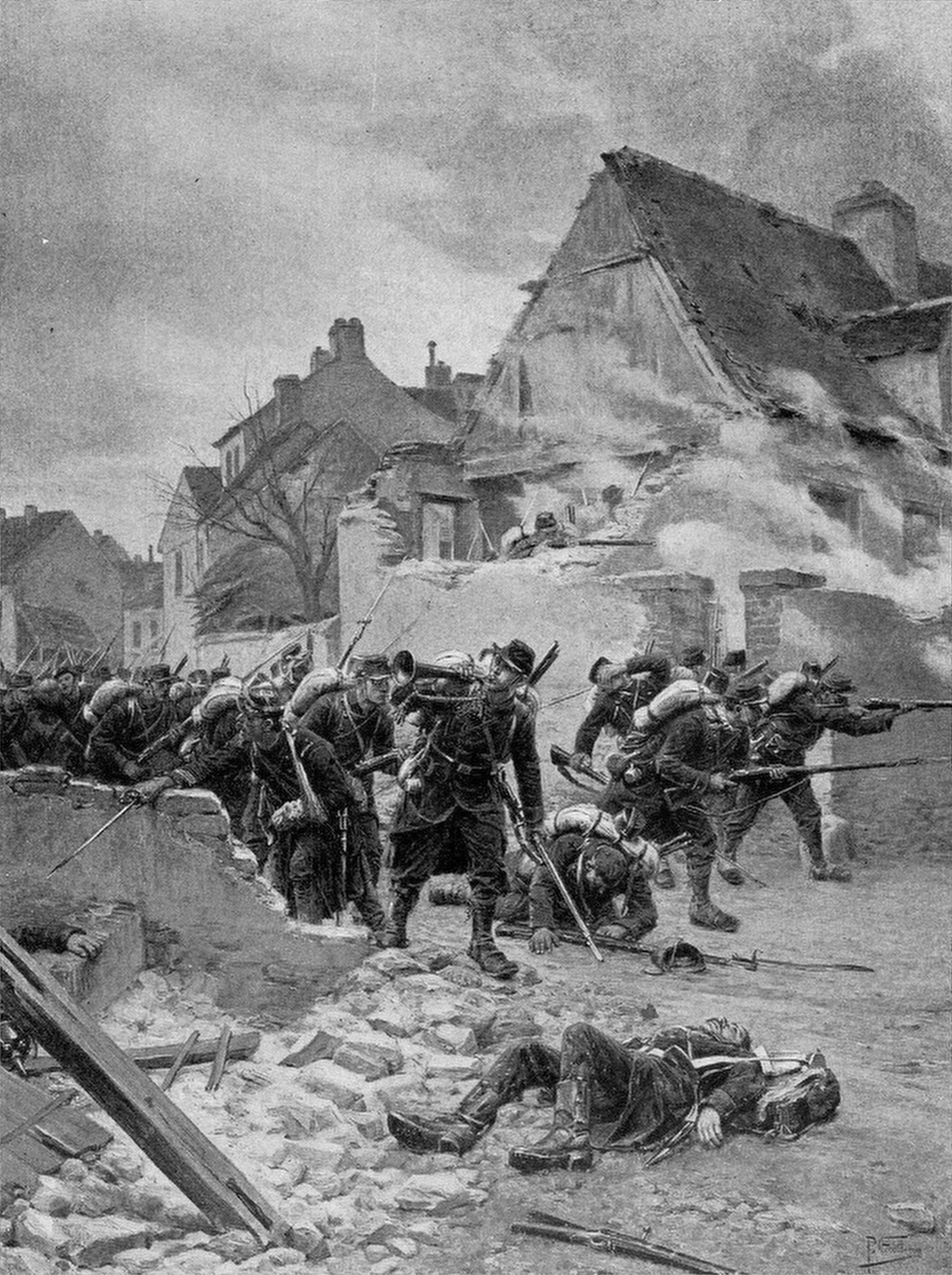
French soldiers entering a village

The Franco-Prussian War of 1870 symbolically marked the integration of Savoy into the French Republic; for the first time, the Savoyards fought for their new homeland, demonstrating their attachment to France.

Among these units was the 1st Battalion of the Savoy Mobile Guard, made up of enthusiastic but poorly trained and equipped troops, commanded by Charles-Albert Costa de Beauregard, who was incorporated into the Army of the East. This army, commanded by General Charles Denis Bourbaki, aimed to break the siege of Belfort. Between January 14 and 16, 1871, the Battle of the Lisaine took place to control access to Belfort. On January 15, the Savoy Mobile Guard companies and the Zouaves received orders to take Bethoncourt (Doubs). As they entered the seemingly quiet village, gunfire erupted. “From all sides, we were surrounded by fire,” wrote Charles-Albert Costa de Beauregard, who himself was wounded. These were the most violent battles of the Army of the East, and 72 Savoyards were killed in this commune. (Note: Mayeur, Sorrel & Hilaire 1996, p. 134. oday, there is a Cooperation of the communes of Bethoncourt and La Motte-Servolex archive, which since 2006 has commemorated the presence of Savoyards at the Battle of Bethancourt, during which Commander Charles-Albert Cosat de Beauregard was wounded on January 16, 1871. Daniel Seigneur's personal website refers to this historical moment on page 15 and especially the following pages archive.)

Furthermore, during this period of turmoil, Switzerland watched the events with great interest, especially when the fighting drew closer to its borders in 1871. According to Article VII of the Treaty of Turin of 1816, the Swiss Confederation considered applying this article by neutralizing the northern part of Savoy. On July 16, 1870, the Swiss Federal Council warned the great powers: “It would exercise this right if circumstances seemed to require it to defend Swiss neutrality and the integrity of its territory.” The Republican Committee of Bonneville demanded occupation, and the Prefect of Savoy, Eugène Alexandre Guiter, did the same, although he was situated outside the territory covered by Article VII. However, under pressure regarding the interpretation of its actions, Switzerland abandoned its plan, especially following the capitulation of Paris.

With the proclamation of the Third Republic and the election of a new generation of parliamentarians, Savoy ceased to be seen as a recently acquired territory.

== Under the Third Republic ==
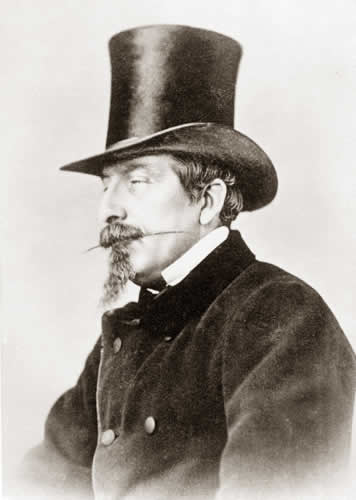
Napoleon III Emperor (by Nadar)

After the defeat at Sedan, influential republicans took control of the major municipalities. In both prefectures, departmental commissions were established without opposition.

- Eugène Guiter, a general councilor from the Pyrénées-Orientales, was appointed prefect and presided over the Chambéry commission on September 5, 1870. Jean-Baptiste Finet (Note: Jean-Baptiste Finet (born in 1813 in Saint-Jean-de-Maurienne) was a lawyer. He became a member of the Chambéry bar in 1841, before becoming the public prosecutor at the city's Court of Appeal from 1870 to 1873.) was appointed mayor by the provisional municipal commission.
- Jules Philippe, a publicist, was appointed prefect and presided over the Annecy commission on September 5, 1870. Louis Chaumontel was appointed mayor by the provisional municipal commission.
- A popular assembly appointed a municipal committee in Moûtiers, while a democratic committee was established in Thonon-les-Bains.
- A provisional safety committee was formed in Bonneville.

Following the election of Adolphe Thiers as president of the Republic in 1871, the Savoyard right regained ground by electing engineer Humbert Grange (Savoie - Union of the Right) as the deputy for the 2nd constituency, supported by the clergy.

Jacques-Flavien-Victor Henrion de Stool de Magnoncour, a conservative former officer, was appointed to the prefecture of Chambéry. Léon Gambetta made an official trip starting on September 21, 1872, visiting Chambéry, Albertville, Annecy, Thonon, and Bonneville. The purpose of this trip was to distance the last remnants of separatism directed toward Italy or Geneva.

This republican establishment can be explained by the fact that the Savoyards could not turn back to their former monarch, now Italian. Additionally, the influence of the clergy diminished under the criticism and attacks of the liberal press, and religious forces gradually withdrew from public life and increasingly stopped guiding the communities. Finally, the population was attracted to the values of Democracy. Even the fall of Thiers on May 24, 1873, and the subsequent French monarchist shift did not undermine this political anchorage.

As a result of French Italophobia, an Alpine army was created in 1882 (including alpine hunters), and new barracks and fortifications were built or renovated (Albertville, Moûtiers, etc.). Paths and roads were constructed by infantry regiments stationed in Savoy (Modane, Bourg-Saint-Maurice, Chambéry, Annecy).

=== Political trend: a republican anchoring ===
During the legislative elections from 1871 to 1914, both departments regularly sent republican or moderate-leaning deputies to the Assembly until 1898, unlike what happened elsewhere in France. Of the nine constituencies, only the arrondissement of Saint-Jean-de-Maurienne sent a conservative deputy, Charles-Albert Costa de Beauregard, in 1871. This republican success can be attributed to several reasons mentioned previously. Additionally, the main candidates notably avoided discussing religion. Discredit fell on the notables who had served the regime, and a new urban elite, inspired by the ideals of 1848, replaced them as guarantors of peace and progress. The prefect of Savoy, Eugène Alexandre Guiter, noted in 1871 that the population accepted this Republic as it was “the most economical government and the one offering the most secure future results.” Savoyards were perceived by the administration as materialistic and always seeking a strong political figure who could defend their particular interests. For more than twenty years (1871-1898), local figures established themselves in their positions:

- Nicolas Parent (1817-1890) in Chambéry. Sardinian deputy, then French deputy from 1871, and from 1876 to 1880; senator from 1880 to 1889.
- Pierre Blanc (1806-1896) in Moûtiers, deputy from 1876 to 1896.
- Jules-François Horteur in Saint-Jean-de-Maurienne, moderate republican deputy from 1876 to 1895.
- Jules Philippe (1827-1888) in Annecy, Sardinian deputy, then French deputy in 1871, and from 1876 to 1888.
- César Duval (1841-1910) in Saint-Julien-en-Genevois, deputy from 1883 to 1898, then senator from 1898 to 1910.
- André Folliet (1838-1905) in Thonon, deputy from 1876 to 1893, then senator from 1894 to 1905.

From the late 1890s onwards, it was mainly radical and radical-socialist deputies who were regularly elected. Even during debates on the laws of 1901 (articles 13 and 14 on religious congregations) and the separation of Church and State in 1905, which provoked reactions, during the 1906 legislative elections, the radical-socialists won all the seats. It was not until 1910-1914 that a few conservatives won seats in Chambéry, Annecy, or Albertville.

=== An economic development ===
Following the economic crisis that affected Savoy between 1860 and 1890, there was a resurgence in development linked to the completion of transport infrastructures, the use of hydroelectric power, and the growth of thermalism associated with the discovery of the region's mountainous landscape as an asset.

==== Hydropower and the Industrial Sector ====
In this area, Savoy is at the forefront. It is the result of both determination and history. Savoy was a pioneer, starting at the end of the 19th century, in the development of hydroelectricity. It was in 1883 (actually 1885) that La Roche-sur-Foron became the first electrified city in France. Over the years, industrial sectors developed, and Savoy eventually embraced new renewable energy technologies. This successful transition, from one generation of technology to another, supported by a dynamic industrial base, is an example, and I want it to be recognized as such and encouraged wherever possible.

— Speech in Modane (Savoy) by French Prime Minister François Fillon (2007)

Mountains can cause floods which could affect people living in the lower parts of plains. Starting in 1830, the Sardinian government undertook work to prevent these floods by filling in valley bottoms. Through the deposition of silt, several water reservoirs were created, causing a stepped overflow and the formation of several reservoirs, which protect the valleys from sudden floods. Nowadays, Savoy still uses this framework for agriculture and the wood industry. Waterfall correction projects have been undertaken in the valleys by the Mountain Terrain Restoration Service (RTM) since the 1880s (laws of 1860, 1864, 1882), particularly through reforestation efforts on slopes to prevent mudslides.

Savoyard industry remains relatively limited, mostly concentrated around waterways to harness watermills, such as the paper mills in Cran (Papeterie Aussedat) or at Faverges, and the development of silk factories mentioned earlier. This limited development was largely due to the aftereffects of the Annexation. It was not until the years 1869-1889, with Aristide Bergès, the founder of the Société d'éclairage électrique du Grésivaudan, who invented a turbine using the power of waterfalls, that the region saw a resurgence. He coined the term "houille blanche" (white coal) to describe this energy source. From then on, Savoy experienced a revival following the economic crisis of 1860-1890, which also contributed to a slowdown in mountain migration. This period saw the development of aluminum production by hot electrolysis in La Praz in the Arc Valley, the creation of special steels in Ugine in the Val d'Arly, and the extraction of cheddite in Chedde-Passy in the Haut-Faucigny. Later on, connected to the railway development in the Tarentaise, ferro-silicon was produced in La Léchère.

During this period, other industries modernized, driven by a dynamic local elite but often lacking capital. However, this financial shortfall was addressed, particularly in Haute-Savoie, with the creation of the Laydernier Bank by Léon Laydernier in 1891 and the revival of the Bank of Savoy in Chambéry in 1912. It was only with the onset of World War I that external companies, mainly Swiss, began to establish themselves in Savoy.

==== The birth of tourism ====
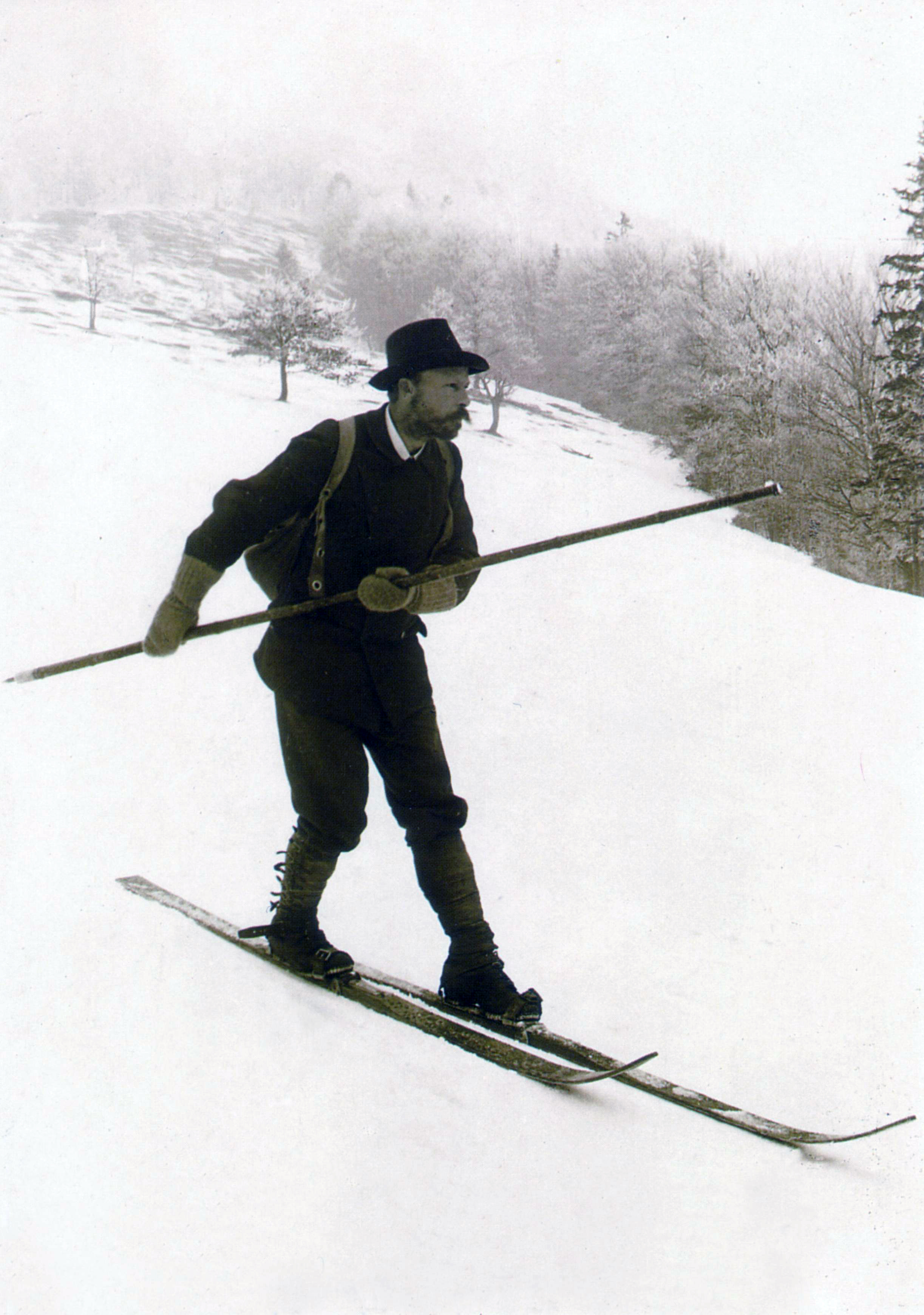
Winter sports (photo from 1905)

On the eve of World War I, this diverse land, with its mountains, blue skies, forests, lakes, and snow, attracted the wealthiest tourists. Aix-les-Bains, with its 18 hotels and guesthouses, and Chamonix, with six hotels, are the two main destinations for these early tourists. The "Hôtel de Londres" in Chamonix, inaugurated in 1770, is one of the few luxury establishments (a palace for the time) in the region. The development of railways (notably the PLM) and roads facilitated the expansion of tourism towards the mountain ranges between 1900 and 1930. This exclusive tourism led to the inauguration of the Chamonix-Montenvers railway in 1908 and the opening of the Mont-Blanc massif cogwheel railway in 1912, connecting the Saint-Gervais SNCF station (at an altitude of 580 meters) to the Bionnassay Glacier (Nid-d'Aigle station at an altitude of 2,372 meters) in Haute-Savoie. In August 1914, the work was interrupted by the war at Nid d'Aigle near the Bionnassay Glacier, and the project was never resumed.

The rise of the automobile and coach transport further promoted sightseeing and the discovery of mountain landscapes. In Saint-Christophe, the Napoléon Tunnel, through which the D1006 passes, is inaugurated. In 1885, the Société des Grottes des Échelles developed caves for visitors near the old Sardinian route, an ancient trade route between Italy and France (Col du Mont-Cenis), abandoned since the tunnel construction.

The trade of snow, referred to as "white gold," brings fortune, and few Savoyards could have imagined that the land, which had been neglected in the 18th century, would one day become a source of family wealth.

== Cultural and social evolution ==
Savoie and Haute-Savoie experienced a significant demographic decline during the first few decades after their annexation to France, while some individuals contributed to French cultural life.

=== Demographic decline ===
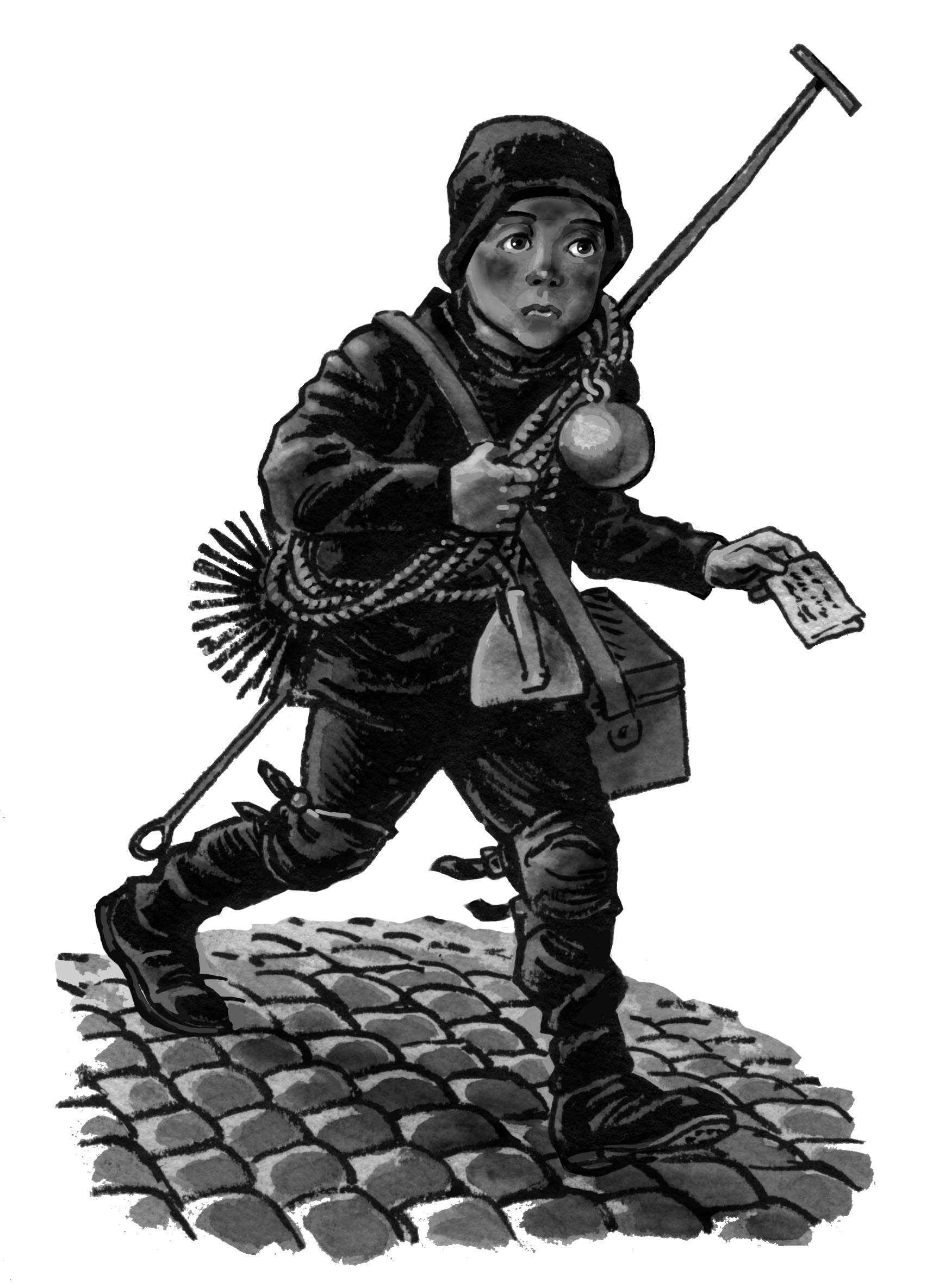
Little Savoyard chimney sweep (drawing by Jean-Claude Pertuzé)

The demographic evolution of the two Savoyard departments went through a crisis due to temporary or permanent economic immigration, which was further accelerated by the Great War.

Population: number of inhabitants from 1860 to 1926
Year	Savoy	Haute-Savoie	Annecy	Chambéry
1860	275 039	267 496	9 370 (Note: Value for the municipality in 1861.)	19 953
1866	271 663	273 768	11 554	18 835
1879	268 361	273 801	10 976	18 545
1896	259 790	265 872	12 894	21 762
1901	254 781	263 803	13 611	22 108
1911	247 890	255 137	15 622	22 958
1921	225 034	235 668	15 004	20 617
1026	231 210	245 317	17 223	23 400

Between 1860 and 1914, Savoie faced a demographic crisis. In the early years (see table), there was an immediate decrease in Savoie, while Haute-Savoie gained inhabitants. However, from the 1880s onwards, both departments saw a population decline (-7%). For half a century, their populations decreased by -9.87% for Savoie and -4.62% for Haute-Savoie. Excluding seasonal workers who moved to the Lyon region, Paris, or southern France, the net loss for the Savoyard departments was around -100,000 people. This traditional migration (Note: The Savoyard migration was driven by a lack of sufficient local resources, the need for additional financial support during the long winter months, or the pursuit of a better standard of living.) of mountain populations, often portrayed as rough and rugged, towards both France and German-speaking countries, is still remembered through the image of the little chimney sweep, though they represent only a small percentage of the migrants. (Note: According to a study conducted by Abbot Louis Rendu in 1838, of the 22,655 migrants, only 2% were chimney-sweeps. In 1862, the prefectural reports indicated that these children—mostly boys, and sometimes girls—numbered about 1,200. Furthermore, it seems that the majority of chimney-sweeps in Paris were originally from Auvergne. According to "Émigrés savoyards, immigrés en Savoie" [Savoyard emigrants, immigrants in Savoie]. Hommes & Migrations (in French) (1166): 11. 1993.) This image often overshadows the diverse professions exercised by these migrants, such as peddlers, knife grinders, merchants, farriers, farmers, coachmen, teachers, or even the collets rouges of the Hôtel Drouot. (Note: These individuals included only 110 Savoyards traditionally from Tarentaise, a monopoly granted by Emperor Napoleon III in 1860, who, according to oral history, wished to thank the Savoyards for the massive plebiscite following the Treaty of Turin in 1860.) Meanwhile, part of the population migrated to the New World. Starting in 1854, migration to Argentina grew, with no less than 4,000 Savoyards leaving between 1860 and 1914. (Note: The creation of the villages of San José, Villa Elisa, and Colón in the Entre Ríos province, Committee Association Savoie Argentine, “Association Savoie Argentine archive”) A prefectural order from January 15, 1863, prohibited the exploitation of young chimney sweeps, who were rented out by parents for 50 francs for six months to unscrupulous employers who also forced them to beg in the streets.

During the "Great War," Savoyards integrated into infantry regiments (30th, 97th, 230th, and 297th) and fought on all fronts, notably on the Alpine front, where they were nicknamed the "Blue Devils" alongside the Dauphiné alpine hunters. (Note: This nickname originates from battles that took place in 1915 in the Vosges (Grand Ballon), where the Alpine hunters, dressed in blue, out of weapons, used rocks to drop them on the enemy. Regaining the upper hand and singing, the surviving Germans referred to them as “Blauen Teufeln” (Blue Devils). Quoted in the works of Muller, Claude (2001). Les mystères du Dauphiné [The mysteries of the Dauphiné] (in French). Éditions De Borée. pp. 96–101. and Léon 1998, pp. 21–22.) While estimates varied, the losses were about 3.5–4% of the total population, and some sources suggest as much as 9% for certain areas. (Note: 9,843 killed in Savoie and 10,400 in Haute-Savoie, according to Comby, Louis (1977). Histoire des Savoyards [History of the House of Savoy] (in French). Nathan. p. 129.; as well as Paul, Louis; Paul (1968). Au cœur de l'Europe, les Alpes [The Alps, in the heart of Europe] (in French). Paris: Flammarion. Other figures: 8,881 for Savoie and 9,193 for Haute-Savoie, according to a study by Abbot François Gex, cited in Palluel-Guillard 1986, p. 354, referenced by Leguay, Thérèse; Leguay, Jean-Pierre; Cerisier, Emmanuel (2005). Histoire de la Savoie [History of Savoy] (in French). Editions Jean-paul Gisserot. p. 112. ISBN 2-87747-804-1.) Some villages lost more than 5% of their populations, such as Bonneval-sur-Arc, which lost 9%.

=== Regionalism ===
A francophone province within the Kingdom of Sardinia, Savoie struggled to find its place within the new French structure, facing unprecedented upheavals in its history.

Following seasonal and permanent migrations, the transformation of valleys through industrialization, and the gradual secularization of society, one can better understand the quote from François Descotes, cited earlier, which questions the place of Savoie and, more specifically, its identity within the broader French entity. However, it becomes clear that there was not a single Savoyard identity immediately after the Annexation, but rather multiple identities corresponding more or less to one of the six historical provinces—Savoie Propre, Maurienne, Tarentaise, Chablais, Genevois, and Faucigny—and, most importantly, to the commune, highlighting a local spirit. These local particularities, or attachments to the "little homeland," were evident in permanent migrations to Paris or other regions of the world, as mentioned earlier. Where one might expect Savoyards to cluster together in the face of difficult uprooting, they reproduced these geographic divisions, as highlighted in an 1834 article titled La colonie des Savoyards à Paris in Revue des Deux Mondes by François Buloz (from Vulbens, Haute-Savoie): "Here, people from Moûtiers, there those from Saint-Jean-de-Maurienne, farther away those from Sallanches, and beyond that, those from Conflans, one commune per neighborhood." A similar observation was made a century later in the work of Alphonse Bouinoud, Les Savoyards à Paris historique de la mutualité et des 40 sociétés savoisiennes de Paris published in 1910. However, little evidence exists of any unified identity. Thus, the Annexation is difficult to view as the crucible of a single identity, as reminded by Paul Guichonnet.

Only the learned societies of Savoy, with aristocratic, ecclesiastical, or liberal origins, experienced a resurgence following the Annexation, becoming the guardians of local identity, culture, and history and remaining the specialists of local hagiography until the 1940s. The provincial divisions reappeared, with each province having its learned society. In addition to those founded in the previous period, new ones emerged, such as the Académie de la Val d'Isère, founded in 1865 by several personalities, including Monseigneur Charvaz, Abbé Martinet, and Count Amédée Greyfié de Bellecombe in Tarentaise; the Académie salésienne, founded in 1878 in Annecy by Monseigneur Claude-Marie Magnin, Bishop of Annecy, and other clergy; and the Académie chablaisienne, founded in 1886 by individuals like journalist Charles Buet and Count Amédée de Foras. Under the aegis of the Académie de Savoie, which already facilitated meetings between figures from each province, the first Congress of the Learned Societies of Savoie took place in Saint-Jean-de-Maurienne in 1878.

=== A new cultural generation ===
The arrival of a new intellectual elite and the development of the press involved Savoie in French cultural life. While writer Amélie Gex and painter Prosper Dunant illustrated the old Savoie, Catholic authors such as Charles Buet and Henry Bordeaux participated in the intellectual life of their time, which was entirely focused on France.

In addition to Archbishop Félix Dupanloup of Orléans, Alexis Billiet, the Archbishop of Chambéry, actively participated in religious questions at the end of the 19th century.

For a long time, Savoie did not have access to newspapers, being dependent on neighboring France or Geneva. From the 1840s, due to changes in the Statute, the first titles appeared (Le Courrier des Alpes, Le Patriote Savoisien). After the Annexation, these newspapers multiplied, marking the political divisions between Catholic conservatives and liberals.

The main titles of the Savoie
Non-exhaustive list of political and agricultural Savoyard newspapers, presented by province (Savoie Propre–Chambéry; Genevois–Annecy; Chablais; Tarentaise and Maurienne):

Published in Chambéry (Savoy):

- Le Courrier des Alpes, journal de la Savoie et des États Sardes (February 3, 1843 – 1903), Catholic and monarchist, conservative.
- Le Patriote Savoisien. Political, industrial, commercial, agricultural, and literary opposition newspaper led by moderate republican Nicolas Parent. June 15, 1848 – 1852, reappeared discreetly under the title Nouveau Patriote Savoisien due to legal prosecution, then as a new version La Patriote Savoisien et des Alpes, December 25, 1869–?. Liberal and anti-clerical newspaper. Nicolas Parent also published Le Paysan d’Albertville.
- Le Journal de la Savoie. Political, administrative, commercial and agricultural newspaper (January 1, 1862 – 1869), a prefectural weekly.
- Les Petites Affiches de Savoie et Patriote Savoyard (1867–1944). Published in Savoie, Haute-Savoie, Isère, and Ain.
- La Gazette du Peuple (1870–1878): Republican.
- Le Mont-Cenis (1873–1879).
- Arrosoir arrosant Chambéry (January 15, 1884–?): Satirical newspaper by Paul Oney.
- La Croix de Savoie (November 1891 – 1944): Daily Catholic social and Christian-democratic newspaper, founded by professors Louis Ternier, Michel Paravy, and Joseph Burlet. It would later become La Vie Nouvelle.
- La Vie du Peuple (1908–?): Christian social weekly, founded by Joseph Delachenal (former contributor to La Croix de Savoie, deputy from 1910–1914).

Published in Annecy:

- L'Abeille de Chamonix. Petit Courrier du Mont-Blanc (1862–1866).
- Les Alpes (1868–1944), founded by Jules Philippe. Organ of the Republican Party for Haute-Savoie. Later became Le Républicain Savoyard after World War II.
- L'Union Savoisienne. Political, religious, literary, agricultural and commercial journal (May 30, 1868 – 1893): Tri-weekly monarchist (Legitimist) and Catholic. Founded by Charles Burdet (1830–1912) and supported by Bishop Claude-Marie Magnin of Annecy.
- La Croix de la Haute-Savoie (1892–1944): Catholic social daily, led by Eugène Tissot.
- Le Bon Sens (1853–1861): Catholic newspaper founded by Annecy publisher Aimé Burdet, pro-annexationist in 1860; Le Moniteur de la Savoie Septentrionale (1860), later Le Miniteur de la Haute-Savoie (1860–1861), which merged with Le Bon Sens to become Le Mont-Blanc (1861–1879).
- L’Industriel Savoisien (1896–1949).

Published in Rumilly (Pays de l'Albanais):

- Le Journal du Commerce et de l'Agriculture (1871–1944).

Published in Saint-Julien-en-Genevois (Bas-Genevois):

- L'Écho du Salève (1866–1882);
- Le Bulletin. Weekly non-political newspaper (February 12, 1865–?): Published on Sundays.
- Le Cultivateur Haut-Savoyard (1877–1944).

Published in Thonon (Chablais savoyard):

- La Nymphe des Eaux (1859–1969); Le Léman (1861–1969) and Le Léman et la Nymphe des Eaux (1869–1871).
- L'Écho du Léman (1896–1949).
- Le Messager Agricole, Commercial et Industriel de la Haute-Savoie (1897/98–1944). Today known as Le Messager.

Published in Bonneville (Faucigny):

- L'Allobroge (1864–1920). Radical newspaper. Merged with Le Mont-Blanc Républicain in 1920. Today known as Le Faucigny.

Published in Tarentaise:

- Le Propagateur. Journal of the Isère Valley, agricultural, commercial and industrial (1865–?, in Albertville);
- Le Savoyard. Agricultural, industrial, artistic and literary journal (1865–?) in Moûtiers, circulated in the Tarentaise Valley; published on Saturdays;
- La Tarentaise. Industrial, commercial, agricultural and literary journal (1865–?) in Moûtiers, published on Sundays;
- Le Journal (1865–?) in Salins/Brides.

Satirical newspapers:

- Le Chat des Alpes (1848), which became Le Carillon in Chambéry;
- La Mouche;
- L’Abeille Savoyard;
- Le Parterre: Journal of the Théâtre de Chambéry.

External newspapers:

- Le Petit Dauphinois: 1878–1944. Daily. Later replaced by Le Dauphiné Libéré.

=== Criminal cases ===
Some major criminal cases that shook Savoie during the Third Republic:

- Jean-Alexis Favre Case: La Balme - Court of Assizes of Savoie, May 15, 1888: A peddler named Joseph Roux was found murdered.
- Jean-Marie Spaggiari Case: Albertville - Court of Assizes of Savoie, February 19, 1891: Murder of a cellmate named Chanut, a prisoner at the Albertville central prison. Jean-Marie Spaggiari, 29, born in Vezzano, Italy, was sentenced to the death penalty on February 19, 1891, by the Court of Assizes of Savoie.
- Joseph-François Bandin Case: Saint-Michel-de-Maurienne - Court of Assizes of Savoie, August 6, 1901: Murder of Marie-Clotilde Baudin, his mother.
- Jean-Baptiste Maffiodo Case: Termignon - Court of Assizes of Savoie, May 13, 1903.
- François Maillet Case: Chamoux-sur-Gelon - Court of Assizes of Savoie, February 24, 1904: Crime involving Pierre Jaccoud, a servant.
- Giriat-Bassot-Robardet Case: Aix-les-Bains - Court of Assizes of Savoie, June 1, 1904: Eugénie Fougère and Lucie Maire, her chambermaid, were found dead.
- Antonio Lombardo Case: Moûtiers - Court of Assizes of Savoie, May 30, 1906: The assassin of the guardian Santarelli.
- Jean Casazza Case: Saint-Michel-de-Maurienne - Court of Assizes of Savoie, May 26, 1909.
- Louis Michel Case: Randens - Court of Assizes of Savoie, August 2, 1913.
- Jean-Louis Duval Case: Albertville - Court of Assizes of Savoie, November 27, 1913: The revenge of a deserter.

== See also ==
- Second French Empire
- French Third Republic
- History of Savoy (1792–1815)

== Bibliography ==
=== General books ===
- Mayeur, Jean-Marie; Sorrel, Christian; Hilaire, Yves-Marie (1996). La Savoie. Dictionnaire du monde religieux dans la France contemporaine (in French). Vol. 8. Paris: Éditions Beauchesne. ISBN 978-2-7010-1330-5.
- Edighoffer, Roland (1992). Histoire de la Savoie [History of Savoy]. Que sais-je? (in French). PUF. ISBN 978-2-13-044838-9.
- Menabrea, Henri (2009). Histoire de la Savoie [History of Savoy] (in French). Montmélian: Éd. Bernard Grasset. ISBN 978-2-84206-428-0.
- CH (1969). Cahiers d'Histoire (Revue) : " La Savoie. Des origines à nos jours " [History Notebooks (Journal): “Savoy. From its origins to the present day”] (in French). Vol. 5. Lyon: PUF.

=== Works on the period ===
- Lovie, Jacques (1967). La Savoie dans la vie française de 1860 à 1875 [Savoy in French life from 1860 to 1875] (in French). Paris: Presses Universitaires de France.
- Palluel-Guillard, André (1986). La Savoie de Révolution française à nos jours, XIXe-XXe siècle [The Savoy from the French Revolution to the present day, 19th-20th century] (in French). Ouest France Université. ISBN 2-85882-536-X.
- Raymond, Justinien (1983). La Haute-Savoie sous la IIIe République : histoire économique, sociale et politique, 1875-1940 [Haute-Savoie under the Third Republic: economic, social and political history, 1875-1940] (in French). Seyssel: Atelier national de reproduction des thèses. ISBN 2-903528-25-X.
- Guichonnet, Paul (1982). Histoire de l'annexion de la Savoie à la France et ses dossiers secrets [The history of the annexation of Savoy to France and its secret files] (in French). Roanne: Éditions Horvath. ISBN 978-2-7171-0235-2.
