= Le Courrier des Alpes =

Le Courrier des Alpes (also known as: Le Courrier des Alpes, journal de la Savoie et des États Sardes), was a former conservative, known as "clerical" political newspaper that was published from February 3, 1843 until1903.

The paper was led by Jacques-Marie Raymond, and later by his brother Claude-Melchior Raymond, alongside the poet Jean-Pierre Veyrat. It succeeded the Journal de Savoie (1815–1842): a political, religious, and literary publication also covering agriculture and the arts, which had been founded by their father, Georges-Marie Raymond.

== Editorial stance ==
The newspaper was catholic, monarchist, and conservative in its editorial stance.

It was one of several press outlets, notably alongside L'Écho du Mont-Blanc, published in Annecy, that supported the cause of conservative Savoyard deputies, led by Senator Costa de Beauregard, in the parliament of the Kingdom of Sardinia in Turin.

During the debates over the future of the Duchy of Savoy in 1859–1860, the paper, much like Le Bon Sens, took a position in favor of union with neighboring France, a stance known as "annexationist".

== See also ==
- History of Savoy from 1815 to 1860
- History of Savoy from 1860 to 1914
- 1860 French annexation of Savoy
