= List of Deputies of Savoy in the Sardinian Parliament =

Sardinian parliament

The list of deputies of Savoy in the Sardinian Parliament includes all representatives of the former Duchy of Savoy in the Parliament of the Kingdom of Sardinia, which sat in Turin between 1848 and 1860.

== Context in 1848 ==
With the promulgation of the Albertine Statute on 4 March 1848, the Kingdom of Sardinia underwent significant political, legal, and administrative reforms, marking a shift toward a constitutional system based on public liberties, electoral representation, and the development of political life.

Within this new framework, the Duchy of Savoy was replaced by the administrative divisions of Chambéry and Annecy, each administered by a general intendant.

The reform also established a bicameral parliament composed of a Chamber of Deputies and a Senate. Savoy was represented by 22 deputies from the First to the Sixth legislatures (1848–1860), a number reduced to 18 during the Seventh legislature in 1860. This latter arrangement applied only to the final legislative election preceding the annexation of Savoy to France in March 1860.

The Albertine Statute refers to Savoyard particularism only indirectly, notably in Article 64, which acknowledges the use of French in regions where it was customary. While Italian was established as the official language of the parliamentary chambers, the use of French was permitted for representatives from French-speaking territories and in responses addressed to them. In parallel, the Senate of Savoy definitively lost its remaining judicial functions under the new institutional framework, following the earlier loss of its political authority in 1837, with these powers transferred in particular to the Courts of Appeal.

== Representation ==
From 1848 to 1865, the Chamber of Deputies of the Kingdom of Sardinia was housed in the Palazzo Carignano in Turin, the kingdom’s capital.

Elections were conducted under a two-round, single-member majority system. Eligible voters were men aged 25 or older who were literate, held civil rights, and met a minimum tax requirement of 20 lire, with adjustments in certain cases based on social circumstances. Each electoral district elected one deputy for a term of five years (Article 42).

In 1848, the Duchy of Savoy, with a population of 583,812, was represented by 22 deputies. This number was reduced to 18 following the 1859 electoral reform. Over the period, Savoy sent a total of 79 deputies to Turin. Candidates were required to be at least 30 years old (Article 40), and Article 50 specified that the offices of Senator or Deputy did not provide remuneration or allowances.

Savoy was overrepresented in the Chamber of Deputies relative to its population. In 1848, the duchy was represented by 22 of 204 deputies (approximately 11%). Savoyard voters were subject to a tax qualification of more than 20 francs (law of 17 March 1848, Article 1), whereas the requirement was set at 40 francs in other parts of the kingdom. Similar arrangements applied to the County of Nice, Liguria, and Sicily.

Savoyard deputies, although divided between conservative and liberal currents, generally formed a bloc in opposition to the Piedmontese governments. They sought to assert the distinctiveness of the duchy within a state increasingly oriented toward Italian unification, particularly during the Risorgimento and given the relative delay in the development of the province. Differences emerged on specific issues, notably regarding Savoy’s future in 1859 and its annexation in 1860, which divided deputies between pro-French and anti-annexation positions loyal to the House of Savoy.

== Elections ==
From 1848 to 1859, elections to the Chamber of Deputies of the Kingdom of Sardinia were conducted under Royal Edict on Electoral Law No. 680 of 17 March 1848. The law was revised by the electoral reform of 1859.

During this period, the Chamber of Deputies was renewed across seven legislatures.

=== First legislature ===
The decree of 17 March 1848 convened the electoral colleges for the First Legislature on 27 April 1848. The legislature lasted from 8 May to 30 December 1848.

A total of 14,013 registered voters, representing 2.48% of the population, were eligible to participate in the elections, the first held in the duchy since the period of the First Empire. The turnout rate was 75%, although abstention was considered relatively high for the period, reaching 17% in Chambéry.

In the first legislature, 15 of Savoy’s 22 seats were won by conservative candidates. Ten deputies were drawn from the judiciary or legal profession, while five came from the nobility. As a minority in Parliament, Savoyard deputies generally sought to promote the particular interests of the duchy, including the use of French during debates. Conservatives were associated with clerical positions, while the remaining seven deputies were aligned with constitutional liberalism. Leadership of the Savoyard delegation was generally attributed to Senator Costa de Beauregard of Chambéry, representing the conservatives, while the liberals followed Léon Brunier of Maurienne.

The legislature was marked by a military defeat and debates concerning religious congregations. The historian Robert Avezou characterized its short duration as “exceptionally turbulent and rich in events more sad than happy.”

=== Second legislature ===
Elections for the second legislature were held on 22 January 1849. The legislature was short-lived, sitting from 1 February to 30 March 1849. The new prime minister, Vincenzo Gioberti, faced a Chamber that was described as “ungovernable.”

Savoy re-elected ten incumbent deputies: Costa de Beauregard, de Martinel, Carquet, Despine, Brunier, Louaraz, Jacquemoud, Ginet, Ract, and Chenal.

Voter turnout was 63.3%. Some deputies elected in one district chose to represent another and were not replaced.

=== Third legislature ===
- Elections of 15 July 1849, for the third legislature, from 30 July to 20 November 1849.

Voter turnout was 62.3%.

King Charles Albert of Sardinia died on 28 July 1849.

=== Fourth legislature ===
- Elections of 8 December 1849, for the fourth legislature, from 20 December 1849 to 20 November 1853.

Voter turnout was 71.6%.

=== Fifth legislature ===
- Elections of 8 December 1853, for the fifth legislature, from 19 December 1853 to 25 October 1857.

Voter turnout was 65.3%.

=== Sixth legislature ===
- Elections of 15 November 1857, for the sixth legislature, from 14 December 1857 to 21 January 1860.

Voter turnout was 61.3%.

=== Seventh legislature ===
- Elections of 25 March 1860, for the seventh legislature, from 2 April 1860 to 17 December 1860.

Following the electoral reform of 1859, the Duchy of Savoy was represented by 18 deputies. Voter turnout was 35.8%, reflecting reduced participation, as the process of union with France had already begun with the signing of the Treaty of Turin on 24 March 1860. Many Savoyards no longer considered themselves subjects of King Victor Emmanuel II. (Note: On April 1, the King of Sardinia, Victor Emmanuel, released his Savoyard subjects from their oath of loyalty.) At the opening of the Chamber in Turin on 15 May 1860, fifteen deputies who had openly supported union with France sent a letter to the President of the Chamber indicating that they would not attend. These deputies were de Boigne, de Martinel, Girod, Blanc, Greyfié, Replat, Ginet, Pissard, Chapperon, Grange, Pelloux, de la Fléchère, Baurain, Favrat, and Louaraz. The first eight were members of the delegation led by Count Amédée Greyfié de Bellecombe that met the French Emperor on 21 March 1860. On 21 March 1860, the divisional councils of the duchy convened and decided to send a delegation of forty-one Savoyards, composed of nobles, bourgeois, and ministerial officers, in favor of union with France. The delegation led by Count Amédée Greyfié de Bellecombe for the province of Chambéry included deputy Gustave de Martinel of Aix; provincial councillors Louis Bérard, Maurice Blanc, and Ernest de Boigne; barons Frédéric d’Alexandry d’Orengiani and Louis Girod de Montfalcon; as well as representatives Charles Bertier, Alexis Falcoz, Pierre-Louis Besson, lawyer Antoine Bourbon, Doctor Dardel, Jacques Prosper Degaillon, Charles François, Félix Gruat, Pierre Viviand, Savey-Guerraz, and Major Vuagnat of the National Guard. The Annecy delegation included deputies Albert-Eugène Lachenal, Joseph Ginet (Rumilly), Hippolyte Pissard (Saint-Julien), and Jacques Replat (Annecy), accompanied by former deputy Claude Bastian (Saint-Julien), Dufour, barons Scipion Ruphy (Annecy) and Jules Blanc (Faverges), François Bétrix (director of the Bank of Savoy), Doctor Descotes, Magnin, Masset, and Alexis Rollier. In contrast, the Chablais region, which was more inclined toward a rapprochement with Switzerland, sent only Édouard Dessaix, Félix Jordan, François Ramel, and Gustave Folliet.

== Electoral colleges of the duchy ==
The Kingdom of Sardinia was organized into 204 electoral colleges, 22 of which were allocated to the Duchy of Savoy. At the time, the duchy comprised 639 communes and had a population of 584,812. Each electoral college included, on average, 29 communes and 26,582 inhabitants, resulting in constituencies of between 20,000 and 25,000 inhabitants. In 1848, during the election for the first legislature, Savoy had 17,960 registered voters, corresponding to approximately 31 voters per 1,000 inhabitants.

The duchy was divided into two provinces, Chambéry and Annecy, and contained 22 electoral colleges:

Electoral districts of the Duchy of Savoy
| Administrative province | Electoral district (1848–1859) | Constituent mandates (number of communes) | Population (1848) |
|---|---|---|---|
| Chambéry; Savoie Propre | Aix | Aix (14 communes); Albens (15 communes); Ruffieux (8 communes) | 32,011 inhabitants |
| Chambéry; Haute-Savoie | Albertville | Albertville (18 communes); Grésy (10 communes) | 24,561 inhabitants |
| Annecy; Faucigny | Annemasse | Annemasse (17 communes); Reignier (10 communes) | 23,267 inhabitants |
| Annecy; Genevois | Annecy | Annecy (26 communes) | 26,836 inhabitants |
| Annecy; Faucigny | Bonneville | Bonneville (15 communes); La Roche (11 communes) | 24,310 inhabitants |
| Chambéry; Tarentaise | Bourg-Saint-Maurice | Aime (12 communes); Bourg-Saint-Maurice (9 communes) | 21,963 inhabitants |
| Chambéry; Savoie Propre | Chambéry | Chambéry (19 communes) | 35,739 inhabitants |
| Annecy; Genevois | Duingt | Duingt (23 communes); Thônes (9 communes) | 24,849 inhabitants |
| Annecy; Chablais | Evian | Abondance (8 communes); Evian (11 communes); Le Biot (7 communes) | 26,549 inhabitants |
| Chambéry; Maurienne | La Chambre | Aiguebelle (14 communes); La Chambre (13 communes) | 22,016 inhabitants |
| Chambéry; Savoie Propre | La Motte | La Motte-Servolex (9 communes); Yenne (14 communes) | 21,975 inhabitants |
| Chambéry; Savoie Propre | Montmélian | Chamoux (10 communes); Montmélian (14 communes); La Rochette (12 communes) | 27,716 inhabitants |
| Chambéry; Tarentaise | Moûtiers | Bozel (9 communes); Moûtiers (25 communes) | 23,924 inhabitants |
| Chambéry; Tarentaise | Le Pont-de-Beauvoisin | Les Echelles (11 communes); Pont-de-Beauvoisin (12 communes); Saint-Genix (10 communes) | 26,372 inhabitants |
| Annecy; Genevois | Rumilly | Rumilly (20 communes); Seyssel (17 communes) | 29,041 inhabitants |
| Chambéry; Maurienne | Saint-Jean-de-Maurienne | Lanslebourg (7 communes); Modane (8 communes); Saint-Jean-de-Maurienne (20 communes); Saint-Michel (7 communes) | 34,820 inhabitants |
| Annecy; Genevois | Saint-Julien-en-Genevois | Saint-Julien (29 communes); Thorens-Sales (9 communes) | 29,105 inhabitants |
| Chambéry; Savoie Propre | Saint-Pierre-d'Albigny | Le Châtelard (13 communes); Saint-Pierre-d'Albigny (5 communes) | 20,704 inhabitants |
| Annecy; Faucigny | Sallanches | Cluses (8 communes); Saint-Gervais (8 communes); Sallanches (8 communes) | 31,265 inhabitants |
| Annecy; Faucigny | Taninges | Saint-Jeoire (11 communes); Samoëns (3 communes); Taninges (5 communes) | 27,105 inhabitants |
| Annecy; Chablais | Thonon | Douvaine (16 communes); Thonon (18 communes) | 31,190 inhabitants |
| Chambéry; Haute-Savoie | Ugine | Beaufort (4 communes); Faverges (10 communes); Ugine (9 communes) | 26,498 inhabitants |

The electoral reform of 1859 reorganized the Kingdom of Sardinia into 260 electoral districts. In the Duchy of Savoy, four districts were eliminated, and three new districts were created: Saint-Jeoire, Yennes, and Aiguebelle. The districts of Annemasse, Bourg-Saint-Maurice, Duingt, La Chambre, La Motte, Saint-Jean-de-Maurienne, and Saint-Pierre-d’Albigny were discontinued.

== Summary of results and presentation of the deputies ==
=== Results table by district ===
According to the work of François Miquet and the summary table published in Savoie de la Révolution française à nos jours (1986):

| Electoral district | I Legislature (Apr 1848) | II Legislature (Jan 1849) | III Legislature (Jul 1849) | IV Legislature (Dec 1849) | V Legislature (Dec 1853) | VI Legislature (Nov 1857) | VII Legislature (Mar 1860) |
|---|---|---|---|---|---|---|---|
| Aix | Gustave de Martinel (Cons.) | Gustave de Martinel (Cons.) | Gustave de Martinel (Cons.) | Gustave de Martinel (Cons.) | Gustave de Martinel (Cons.) | Gustave de Martinel (Cons.) | Gustave de Martinel (Cons.) |
| Albertville | Ferdinand Palluel (resigned July); Pierre Blanc | Pierre Blanc | | A.-E. Lachenal (elected in Annecy); Ferdinand Palluel (May 1852); Charles Duverger de Saint-Thomas* | Pierre Blanc (resigned December); Alexandre Bianchi | Count Humbert Jaillet | Joseph Challend* |
| Annemasse | François Perravex* (Cons.) | D. Pierre-Joseph Mongellaz (Cons.) | D. Pierre-Joseph Mongellaz (Cons.) | D. Pierre-Joseph Mongellaz (Cons.) (Note: The authors of La Savoie de Révolution française à nos jours indicated for this legislature, in their summary table, successively the deputies De Livet, A. Guillet, F. Bachet, and E. Lachenal.) | D. Pierre-Joseph Mongellaz (Cons.) | D. Pierre-Joseph Mongellaz (Cons.) | |
| Annecy | A.-E. Lachenal (Cons.); Aimé Levet (Liberal, from June 1848) | Antoine Mathieu | Antoine Mathieu (departed September 1849); Baron de Livet (Cons.) | Baron de Livet (Conservative, January 1852); François-Marie Bachet* (January 1852 – resigned March 1853) | A.-E. Lachenal (Cons.); Alexis Guillet* (Lib.) | Alexis Guillet* (Lib.) | Jacques Replat |
| Bonneville (Note: The authors of La Savoie de Révolution française à nos jours indicated, in their summary table, the deputies F. Bastian and Jacquier-Châtrier from the First to the Sixth legislatures.) | François-Marie Bastian (Lib.); Joseph Jacquier-Châtrier (Lib.) | Joseph Jacquier-Châtrier; Joseph Jacquier-Châtrier (Lib.) | Joseph Jacquier-Châtrier (Lib.) | Joseph Jacquier-Châtrier (Lib.) | Joseph Jacquier-Châtrier (Lib.) | Joseph Pelloux (Cons.) | Joseph Pelloux |
| Bourg-Saint-Maurice | François Carquet (Moderate Republican) | François Carquet (Moderate Republican) | François Carquet (Moderate Republican) | François Carquet (Moderate Republican) | François Carquet (Moderate Republican; resigned 1854); Balthazard Billiet* | Jacques Chevray; François Carquet (Moderate Republican) | |
| Chambéry | Pantaléon Costa de Beauregard (Cons.) | Pantaléon Costa de Beauregard (Cons.) | Pantaléon Costa de Beauregard (Cons.) | François Justin (Cons.) | Pantaléon Costa de Beauregard (Conservative, from February 1854) | Pantaléon Costa de Beauregard (Cons.) | Ernest de Boigne |
| Duingt | Charles-Marie-Joseph Despine (Cons.) | Charles-Marie-Joseph Despine (Cons.) | Charles-Marie-Joseph Despine (Cons.) | Charles-Marie-Joseph Despine (Cons.) | Charles-Marie-Joseph Despine (Cons.) | Baron Girod de Montfalcon (Lib.) | |
| Evian | Basile Folliet* | Mathias Arminjon | Baron de Blonay | Baron de Blonay; Antoine Mathieu | Antoine Mathieu (resigned 1854); Louis Rubin* | Charles Gabriel Laurent* (Cons.) | Baron Favrat de Bellevaux |
| La Chambre | Léon Brunier (Lib.) | Léon Brunier (Lib.) | Léon Brunier (Lib.) | Léon Brunier (Lib.) | Léon Brunier (Lib.) | François Grange* (Cons.) | |
| La Motte | François Gillet* | Benoît Mollard (Cons.) | Benoît Mollard (Cons.) | Benoît Mollard (Conservative, resigned 1851); Humbert Jaillet; Jean-Baptiste Dupraz* (Note: The election was annulled due to incompatibility of offices; Dupraz was then Intendant General of Savoy.); Baron Girod de Montfalcon | Baron Girod de Montfalcon (Lib.) | Benoît Mollard (Cons.) | |
| Montmélian | Antoine Louaraz (Lib.) | Antoine Louaraz (Lib.) | Antoine Louaraz (Lib.) | Antoine Louaraz (Lib.) | Antoine Louaraz (Lib.) | Stephane Leblanc (Cons.) (Note: The election of Leblanc was overturned for “clerical interference.”); Antoine Louaraz (Lib.) | Antoine Louaraz (Lib.) |
| Moûtiers | Antoine Jacquemoud (Lib.) | Antoine Jacquemoud (Lib.) | Antoine Jacquemoud (Lib.) | François Carquet; Claude Gonnet (died December 1852) (Note: The two deputies are given by the authors of La Savoie de Révolution française à nos jours. François Miquet indicates on the one hand that François Carquet was elected from 1848 to 1854, but at the same time that Claude Gonnet was elected in 1852, that is, during the same period.) | Michel Roux-Vollon* (Cons.) | Antoine Jacquemoud (Lib.) | Count Amédée Greyfié de Bellecombe |
| Le Pont-de-Beauvoisin | Baron Joseph Jacquemoud | Baron Joseph Jacquemoud (annulled February) (Note: The election was annulled on February 8, 1849, due to incompatibility of offices.); Ferdinand Palluel | Baron Joseph Jacquemoud | Baron Joseph Jacquemoud (resigned November 1850); Eugène-Joseph Parent (Liberal, resigned 1853); Joseph Guillot | Timoléon Chapperon (Cons.) | Timoléon Chapperon (Cons.) | Timoléon Chapperon (Cons.) |
| Rumilly | Louis Girod (resigned October 18); Joseph Ginet (Cons.) | Joseph Ginet (Cons.) | Gaspard Brunet* | Timoléon Chapperon (Cons.) | Joseph Ginet (Cons.) | Joseph Ginet (Cons.) | Joseph Ginet (Cons.) |
| Saint-Jean-de-Maurienne | François Crettin* | Matthieu Bonafous (annulled) (Note: The election was annulled because the ballot box had been unattended for three hours.); Louis-Frédéric Ménabréa (Cons.) | Louis-Frédéric Ménabréa (Cons.) | Louis-Frédéric Ménabréa (Cons.) | Louis-Frédéric Ménabréa | Louis-Frédéric Ménabréa (Cons.) | |
| Saint-Julien-en-Genevois | Raymond de Serraval* (resigned October 1848); Claude-Marie Bastian (Liberal, November) | Claude-Antoine Girard* (Lib.) | Hippolyte Pissard (Cons.) | Hippolyte Pissard (Conservative, end 1852); Count Roussy de Sales* (circa 1852-1853); Count Charles de Viry (Cons.) | Count Charles de Viry (Cons.) | Count Charles de Viry (Cons.) | Hippolyte Pissard |
| Saint-Pierre-d'Albigny | Henri Ract (Lib.) | Henri Ract (Lib.) | Henri Ract (Lib.) | Charles de Menthon d'Aviernoz | Louis Jacquemoud* (until 1854); Mathias Arminjon; Count Hippolyte de Chambost (Cons.) | Jean-François Borson (Cons.) | |
| Sallanches | Joseph-Agricola Chenal (Lib.) | Joseph-Agricola Chenal (Lib.) | Joseph-Agricola Chenal (Lib.) | Joseph-Agricola Chenal (Lib.) | Joseph-Agricola Chenal (Lib.) | Joseph-Agricola Chenal (Lib.) | Joseph-Agricola Chenal (Lib.) |
| Taninges | Georges-Marie Allamand | François-Marie Bastian (Lib.) | François-Marie Bastian (Lib.) | François-Marie Bastian (Lib.) | Germain Sommeiller | Count de La Fléchère (Cons.) | |
| Thonon | Général Joseph-Marie de Foras | Ernest Dubouloz* (did not sit) (Note: Ernest Dubouloz is placed by the authors of La Savoie de Révolution française à nos jours in Thonon, while François Miquet indicates that he was elected in 1848 in the district of Évian.); Jacques-François Frézier* | Jacques-François Frézier*; Baron Favrat de Bellevaux | Baron Favrat de Bellevaux | Pantaléon Costa de Beauregard (abandoned for Chambéry, February 1854); Général Gerbaix de Sonnaz | Count Gerbaix de Sonnaz (Cons.) | Jules Beaurain* |
| Ugine | Count de Chevron Villette | Antoine Mathieu (end January 1849) (Note: Antoine Mathieu was elected simultaneously in Annecy and Ugine and chose Annecy.); Ambroise Delachenal | Ambroise Delachenal | Count Chevron Villette; Maurice Blanc* | Maurice Blanc (resigned 1854); Antoine Mathieu | A.-E. Lachenal (Cons.) | Maurice Blanc |

Note: Deputies who have an article appear in blue; those followed by an asterisk have a description in the following section: (Note: For a recent biography of the various deputies of the Duchy of Savoy in the Parliament of Turin for this period, only the academic work by Miranti appears to exist: Miranti, M (1980). I deputati della Savoia al Parlamento Subalpino (1848- 1860) [The Deputies of Savoy in the Subalpine Parliament (1848-1860)] (Thesis) (in Italian). Université de Turin. pp. 306–503.)

- The presence of one or more candidates corresponds to annulments or resignations.
- Cons.: conservatives.
- Lib.: liberal-democrats.

In March 1860, three new districts appeared: Saint-Jeoire, with the election of Count Étienne de La Fléchère; Yenne with Baron Louis Girod de Montfalcon; and Aiguebelle with François Grange.

=== Biographical elements of the deputies ===
Below is a presentation, in alphabetical order, of the deputies who do not have a specific article in the encyclopedia:

| Name (Italianized form) (dates) | Legislature | Biographical details |
|---|---|---|
| Bachet, François-Marie; Francesco Bachet (1817-1881) | IV (1852–1853, resigned) | Born 15 April 1817 in Annecy, died 1881 in Neuilly-sur-Marne. Trained as a chemist, became director of the Caisse d'Escompte. Elected deputy in January 1852, resigned in March 1853 for family reasons. Ran again in December 1853 but was not elected. |
| Beaurain, Jules; Cesare Beaurin (1817-....) | VII (1860) | Jules François Marie Beaurain, born 21 July 1805, died 16 October 1872 in Thonon. Lawyer, syndic of Thonon (1858), supporter of the Annexation and creation of a customs zone. First mayor of Thonon (1 December 1860–April 1865) after Annexation. Knight of the Legion of Honour. Married Julie de Seyssel in 1837. |
| Billiet, Balthazard; Baldassarre Billet (1818-1871) | V (1854–1857) | Born 6 November 1818 in Les Chapelles, died 29 May 1871. Doctor of Law, lawyer in Chambéry (1854), later judge at the Annecy tribunal. Nephew of Cardinal Billiet. |
| Brunet, Gaspard; Gaspare Brunet (1788-1854) | III (1849) | Gaspard Sébastien Brunet, born 23 December 1788, died 22 June 1854 in Chambéry. Lawyer. French sous-préfet of Chambéry (2 Aug–17 Dec 1815), vice-intendant, intendant of Faucigny and Voghera, made count in 1834, general intendant in Genoa and of the Azienda in 1836, retired 1848. Commander of the Orders of Saints Maurice and Lazarus. Son of a lawyer and mayor of Bassens; married Maria-Élisa Ménabréa, sister of Léon and Luigi Federico Menabrea. |
| Challend, Joseph-Sébastien; Giuseppe Challend (....-....) | VII (1860) | Born 28 January 1815 in Montailleur, died 1870. Mayor of Montailleur after Annexation. After marrying Josephte de Roget de Cevins in 1835, he took the name Challend de Roget de Cevins. |
| Crettin, François; Francesco Crettin (....-1857) | I (1848) | Born 19 December 1791 in Termignon, died 21 October 1857 in Turin. Doctor of Law, legal scholar, magistrate, advisor at the Court of Cassation, first President of the Court of Appeal of Savoy (1851). Grand Officer of the Orders of Saints Maurice and Lazarus. |
| Dubouloz, Ernest; Ernesto Dubouloz (1807-1898) | II (1849, did not sit) | Born 23 January 1807 in Thonon. Landowner. Elected deputy in 1849 but refused mandate as he became syndic of Thonon. Son of lawyer Louis Dubouloz and Mlle Riboud de Bourg. Married Jeanne-Pétronille-Anne-Adélaïde Dupas (1813–…), daughter of General Pierre Louis Dupas; had two sons, Ferdinand and Auguste, member of the Chablaisian Academy. |
| Dupraz, Jean-Baptiste; Giovanni Battista Dupraz | IV (1849, election annulled for incompatibility) | Died 11 December 1880 in Fossano. Lawyer, division chief at the Ministry of the Interior. |
| Duverger de Saint-Thomas, Charles (Count); Carlo Du Verger de Saint Thomas (1820-....) | IV (1849–1853) | Charles-Marie-François Duverger, Baron de Saint-Thomas, born 21 August 1820 in Aire (Pas-de-Calais). Cavalry officer, major 1860. Difficult integration into French army after Annexation, squadron leader in 1st Cuirassiers (1865), inactive for temporary infirmity in 1867, retired 29 May 1869. Officer of the Legion of Honour, Knight of the Orders of Saints Maurice and Lazarus (27 Dec 1861). Member of the Florimontane Academy. Title of count by patent 31 Oct 1846. Son of Marie Jérôme Duverger, cavalry captain and Legion of Honour knight. Married Léonie de Launay in 1845. |
| Folliet, Jean-Basile; Basilio Folliet (1784-1866) | I (1848) | Born 1784 in Évian, died 1866. Lawyer, justice of the peace in Abondance, syndic of Évian until 1860. Owner of Château de Neuvecelle. Married Péronne Métral; six children. |
| Frézier, Jacques-François; Giovanni Francesco Frezier (1798-1858) | II–III (1849) | Born 1798 in Vailly, died 25 July 1858 in Thonon. Magistrate from 1823, judge at Annecy tribunal. Descendant of a notary family established in Vailly since 17th century. Cousin of deputy of Frangy, Claude-François Bastian. |
| Gillet, François Francesco Gillet (....-....) | I (1848) | Landowner |
| Girard, Claude-Antoine; Claudio Antonio Girard (1803-1863) | II (1849) | Born 15 January 1803 in Viry. Lawyer, member of the liberal current. Died 29 June 1863 crossing Mont-Cenis Pass. |
| Grange, François; Francesco Grange (1801) | VII (1860) | Lawyer from a notable family of Randens and the district of Aiguebelle. |
| Guillet, Alexandre, known as Alexis; Alessandro Guillet (1802-1873) | IV, V, VI (1849–Jan 1852, 1853–1860) | Pierre Alexandre Guillet, born 1802, died 1873 in Annecy. Lawyer, president of provincial tribunal of Saint-Jean-de-Maurienne (1854); after Annexation, president of first-instance tribunal of Thonon, advisor at Court of Appeal of Chambéry, knight of Legion of Honour. |
| Guillot, Joseph; Giuseppe Guillot (....-....) | IV (Apr–Dec 1853) | Native of Dullin. Merchant in Turin. Described as influential through commercial ties in Piedmont and Lyon, noted for integrity and patriotic sentiment. |
| Humilly de Serraval, Raymond (d'); Raimondo De Serraval (1794-1851) | I (Apr–Oct 1848) | Humilly family. Born on 8 February 1794 (20 Pluviôse, Year XI) in Viry and died on 7 March 1851 in Viry. A career military officer, he was a major in the Savoy regiment, captain in the 2nd Savoy regiment (1835–1838), corps major (1839–1844), left the Savoy brigade with the rank of lieutenant colonel (1846), and was placed on retirement on 30 September 1843. He is said to have been commander of the Chambéry fire brigade. He was the son of Joseph-Jean-Baptiste d’Humilly de Serraval, a military officer. He married Anne-Pichelle-Valérie de Lamare on 27 February 1832. |
| Jacquemoud, Louis; Luigi Jacquemoud (unknown) | V (1853–late 1854) | Born in Chambéry. Lawyer and war auditor. Son of Pierre Jacquemoud, lawyer, and Marie Domenget; brother of Baron Joseph Jacquemoud. |
| Laurent, Charles Gabriel; Carlo Gabriele Laurent (1804-1885) | VI (1857–1860) | Born 15 April 1804 in Évian, died 1885. Doctor of Law, magistrate, president of Moûtiers tribunal (1854), advisor at Courts of Appeal of Genoa and Chambéry after Annexation. Knight of Legion of Honour. |
| Leblanc, Stephane | VI (Election annulled for “clerical interference.”) | |
| Parent, Eugène-Joseph; Eugenio Parent (v.1790-1858) | IV (Nov 1850–resigned 1853) | Born c.1790 in Sallanches, died 15 January 1858 at Les Marches. Lawyer. Father of French deputy and senator Nicolas Parent. |
| Perravex, François; Francesco Perravez (1780-1852) | I (1848) | Born c.1780 in Arbusigny, died 30 March 1852 in Mornex. Landowner, director of Alex glassworks. Provincial councilor and syndic of Mornex (7 years), provincial adviser for Genevois. Sat with conservatives, agricultural specialist. Later senator in Savoy Senate. Married Andréanne Bain, daughter of Senator Claude-François Bain. |
| Roux-Vollon, Michel; Michele Roux Vollon (1808-1878) | V (1853, asked to resign by group 1857) | Born 11 November 1808 in Saint-Jean-de-Belleville, died 4 July 1878. Farmer, cheese merchant selling in Turin during sessions. Syndic, later mayor of Saint-Jean-de-Belleville after Annexation. Knight of Legion of Honour (15 March 1867). |
| Rubin, Louis; Gian Luigi Rubin (1785-1860) | V (7 March 1854–1857) | Louis Jean François Rubin, from Saint-Pierre-d’Albigny (?). General intendant of Genevois province, then Sardinia. Knight of Orders of Saints Maurice and Lazarus. Made Baron in 1830 by letters patent of King Charles-Félix. Married Marie-Georgine-Françoise Mathieu de Marclay-Cervens in 1816. Sons — General Gustave Rubin de Cervens and Rear Admiral Ernest Rubin de Cervens — authorized in 1858 to take the name Cervens, a noble Chablais family, as “heirs of the senior branch of the Mathieu de Marclay family, with sovereign permission.” |

== See also ==
- History of Savoy from 1815 to 1860
- Annexation of Savoy
- Parliament of the Kingdom of Sardinia
- List of legislatures of the Italian Republic
- Unification of Italy
- List of deputies from Savoie

== Bibliography ==
=== General works ===
- Cerisier, Emmanuel; Leguay, Thérèse; Leguay, Jean-Pierre (2005). Histoire de la Savoie [History of Savoy] (in French). Vol. 8. Paris: Éditions Jean-paul Gisserot. ISBN 2-87747-804-1.
- Guichonnet, Paul (2007). Nouvelle encyclopédie de la Haute-Savoie : Hier et aujourd'hui [New Encyclopedia of Haute-Savoie: Yesterday and Today] (in French) (2nd ed.). Montmélian: La Fontaine de Siloé. ISBN 978-2-84206-374-0.
- Guichonnet, Paul (1999). Nouvelle histoire de la Savoie [New History of Savoy] (in French). Toulouse: Privat. ISBN 2-7089-8315-6.
- Mayeur, Jean-Marie; Sorrel, Christian; Hilaire, Yves-Marie (1996). La Savoie [Savoy] (in French). Vol. 8. Paris: Beauchesne. ISBN 2-7010-1330-5.

=== Works on the period ===
- Avezou, Robert (1932). "La Savoie depuis les Réformes de Charles-Albert jusqu'à l'Annexion à la France, 1re partie (1847-1852)" [Savoy from the Reforms of Charles Albert to the Annexation by France, Part 1 (1847–1852)]. Mémoires et documents publiés par la Société savoisienne d'histoire et d'archéologie (in French) (69): 1–176.
- Avezou, Robert (1933). "La Savoie depuis les réformes de Charles-Albert jusqu'à l'annexion à la France, 2me partie (1852-1860)" [Savoy from the reforms of Charles Albert to its annexation by France, Part 2 (1852–1860)]. Mémoires et documents publiés par la Société savoisienne d'histoire et d'archéologie (in French): 73–248.
- Guichonnet, Paul (1982). Histoire de l'annexion de la Savoie à la France et ses dossiers secrets [History of the annexation of Savoy to France and its secret files] (in French). Roanne: Éditions Horvath. ISBN 978-2-7171-0235-2.
- Heyriès, Hubert (2001). Les militaires savoyards et niçois entre deux patries, 1848-1871 : Approche d'histoire militaire comparée : armée française, armée piémontaise, armée italienne - Volume 30 de Études militaires [Savoyard and Nice soldiers between two homelands, 1848-1871: A comparative military history approach: French army, Piedmontese army, Italian army - Volume 30 of Military Studies] (in French). Montpellier: Université Paul-Valéry-Montpellier III. ISBN 978-2-84269-385-5.
- Milbach, Sylvain (2008). L'éveil politique de la Savoie, 1848-1853 : conflits ordinaires et rivalités nouvelles [The political awakening of Savoy, 1848-1853: ordinary conflicts and new rivalries]. Histoire (in French). Rennes: Presses Universitaires de Rennes. ISBN 978-2-7535-0697-8.
- Milbach, Sylvain (2008a). Entre Piémont et France : la Savoie déroutée, 1848-1858 [Between Piedmont and France: Savoy in turmoil, 1848–1858] (in French). Chambéry: ditions de l'université de Savoie. ISBN 978-2-915797-50-3.
- Miquet, François (1895). "Les représentants de la Savoie au Parlement sarde (Suite)" [Representatives of Savoy in the Sardinian Parliament (continued)]. Revue savoisienne (in French). XI (II): 171–178 & 250–270.
- Miranti, M. I deputati della Savoia al Parlamento Subalpino (1848- 1860) [The Deputies of Savoy in the Subalpine Parliament (1848-1860)] (Thesis) (in Italian). Université de Turin.
- Palluel-Guillard, André (1986). La Savoie de la Révolution française à nos jours, XIXe – XXe siècle [Savoy from the French Revolution to the present day, 19th–20th centuries] (in French). Ouest France Université. pp. 106–126. ISBN 2-85882-536-X.
