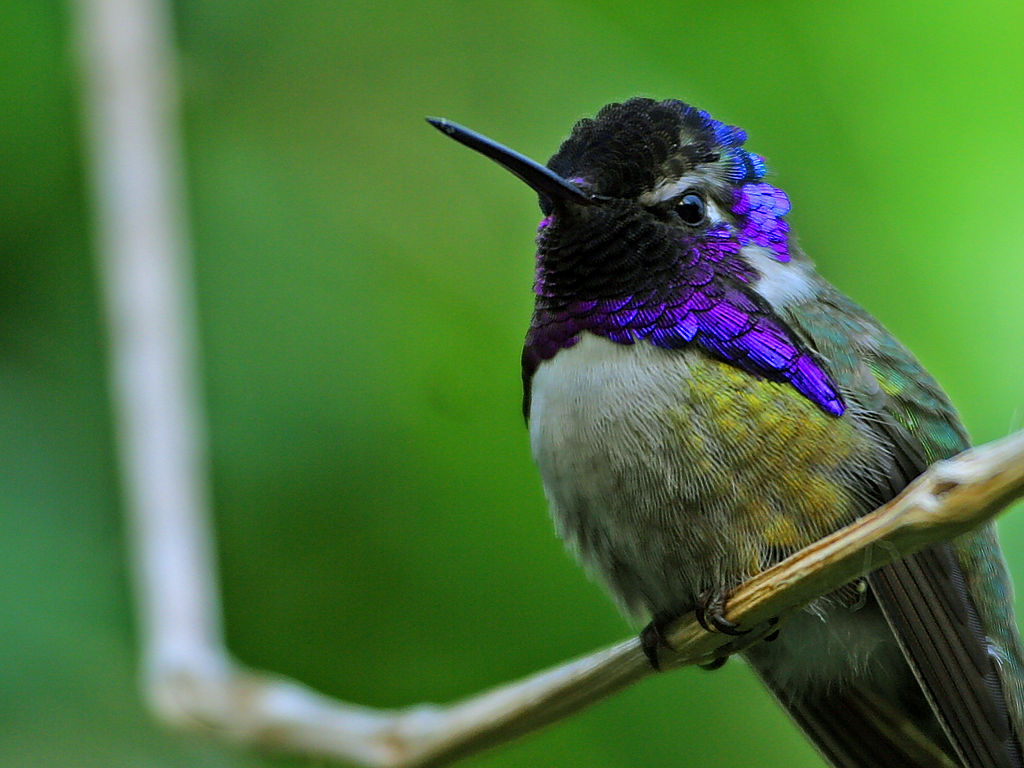

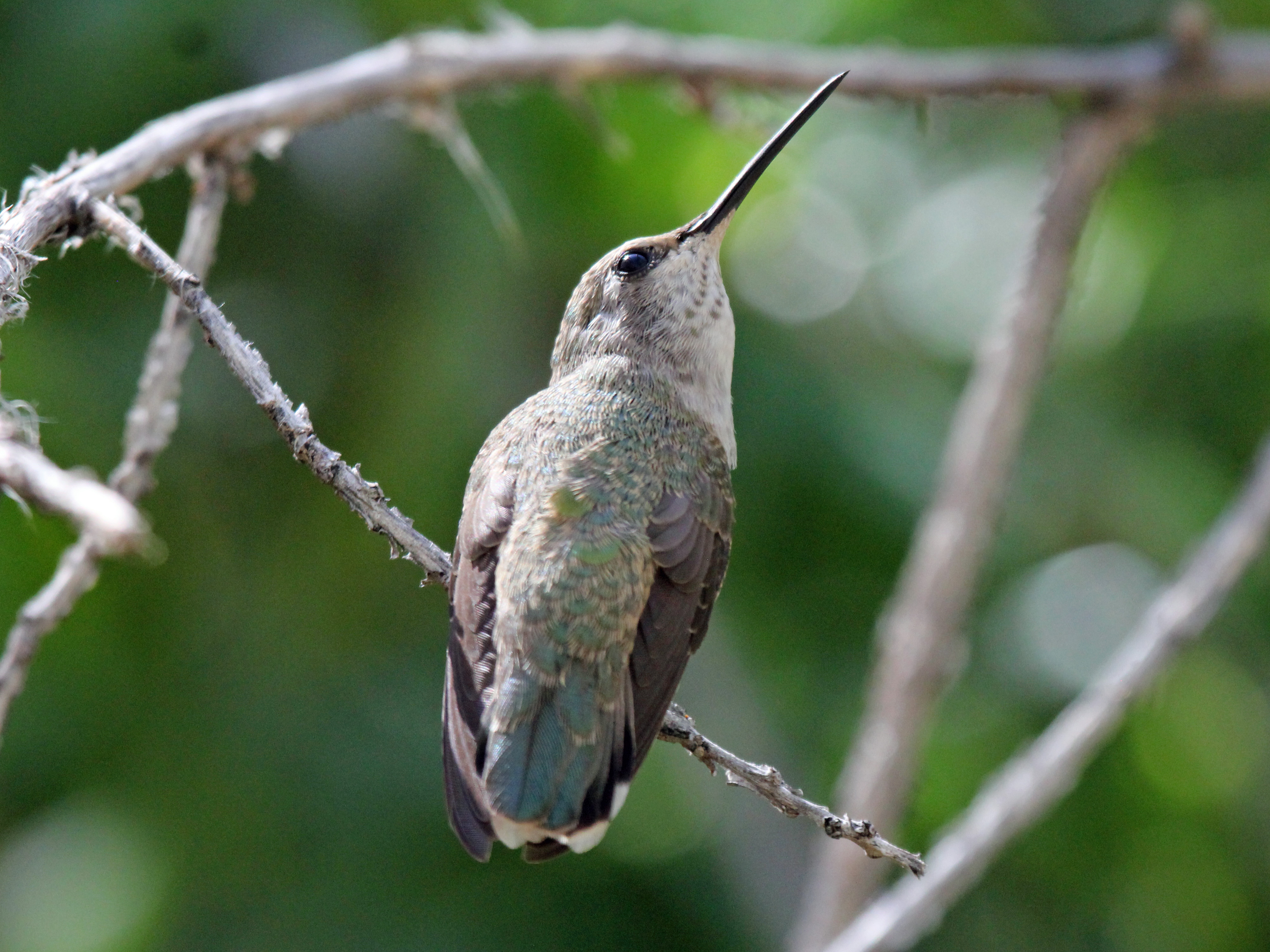
- Male (above) and female (below)

Conservation status
- Least Concern (IUCN 3.1)
- CITES Appendix II

Scientific classification
- Kingdom: Animalia
- Phylum: Chordata
- Class: Aves
- Order: Apodiformes
- Family: Trochilidae
- Genus: Calypte
- Species: C. costae

Binomial name
- Calypte costae (Bourcier, 1839)
- Range of C. costae Breeding range Year-round range Wintering range

= Costa's hummingbird =

Species of bird

Costa's hummingbird (Calypte costae) is a species of hummingbird in the family Trochilidae. It breeds in the arid, semi-arid and Mediterranean climate zones of the Southwestern United States and northwestern Mexico, mainly in Southern California and the Baja California Peninsula. Like many hummingbirds in the region, it can be found on the Pacific coast, often visiting backyard hummingbird feeders and gardens with flowering plants, as well as in more wild ecosystems, such as the conifer and oak forests, chaparral, and high desert habitats found further inland. When not in the US, the species often winters in western Mexico.

== Taxonomy ==
Costa's hummingbird was formally described by the French ornithologist Jules Bourcier in 1839, and given the binomial name Ornismya costae; Bourcier chose the specific epithet to honour French nobleman (and fellow ornithologist) Louis Marie Pantaleon Costa, Marquis de Beauregard (1806–1864). The type locality is Magdalena Bay, on the Pacific west coast, of the Mexican state of Baja California Sur. Costa's hummingbird is presently placed in the genus Calypte, introduced in 1856 by John Gould. The species is monotypic, with no subspecies being currently recognised.

=== Hybridization ===
Hybrids of C. costae and Anna's (C. anna), black-chinned (Archilochus alexandri), and broad-tailed hummingbirds (Selasphorus platycercus) are all known to have occurred.

== Description ==
This species is small, as a mature adult grows to only 3–3.5 in (7.6–8.9 cm) in length, with a wingspan of 11 cm (4.3 in), and an average weight of 3.05 g (0.108 oz) for males and 3.22 g (0.114 oz) for females. The male has a mainly green back and flanks, a small black tail and wings, and patches of white below their gorgeted throat and tail. Its most distinguishing feature is its vibrant purple cap and throat with the throat feathers flaring out and back behind its head. The female is not as distinct as the male, having grayish-green above with a white underbelly.

== Distribution and habitat ==
Costa's hummingbird is common in the arid brushy deserts and gardens of the Southwestern United States and the Baja California Peninsula of Mexico.

== Behavior ==
=== Breeding ===
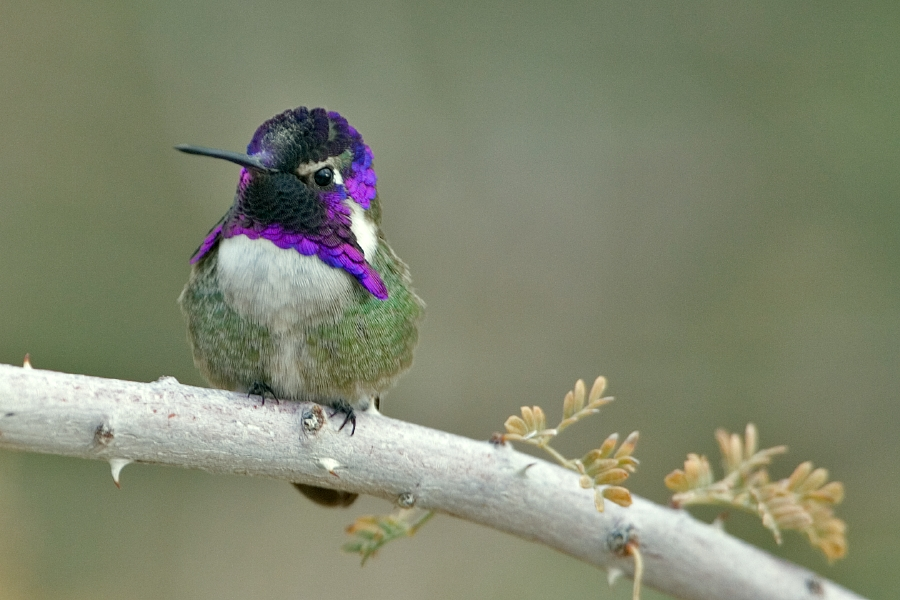
Male, in California

The male Costa's hummingbird's courtship display is a spirited series of swoops and arcing dives, using an angle to the sun to display its violet extended gorget to prospective mates. The male makes a high-speed dive pass or hover close to the female, perched on a nearby branch, and is accented by a high-pitched vibration that is produced by tail feathers. Separately, the male will perch and produce a high-pitched, scratch-like song.

The female constructs a small cup-shaped nest out of plant fibers, down, and at times spider silk, coated with lichen to hold it together. The nest is situated on a yucca stalk or tree limb. The female lays just two eggs, which are white in color, which she will incubate for 15 to 18 days before the young hatch. The young leave the nest after 20 to 23 days.

=== Diet ===
As common with hummingbird species, Costa's hummingbird feeds on flower nectar and small insects. While feeding in flight, a Costa's hummingbird may hover.

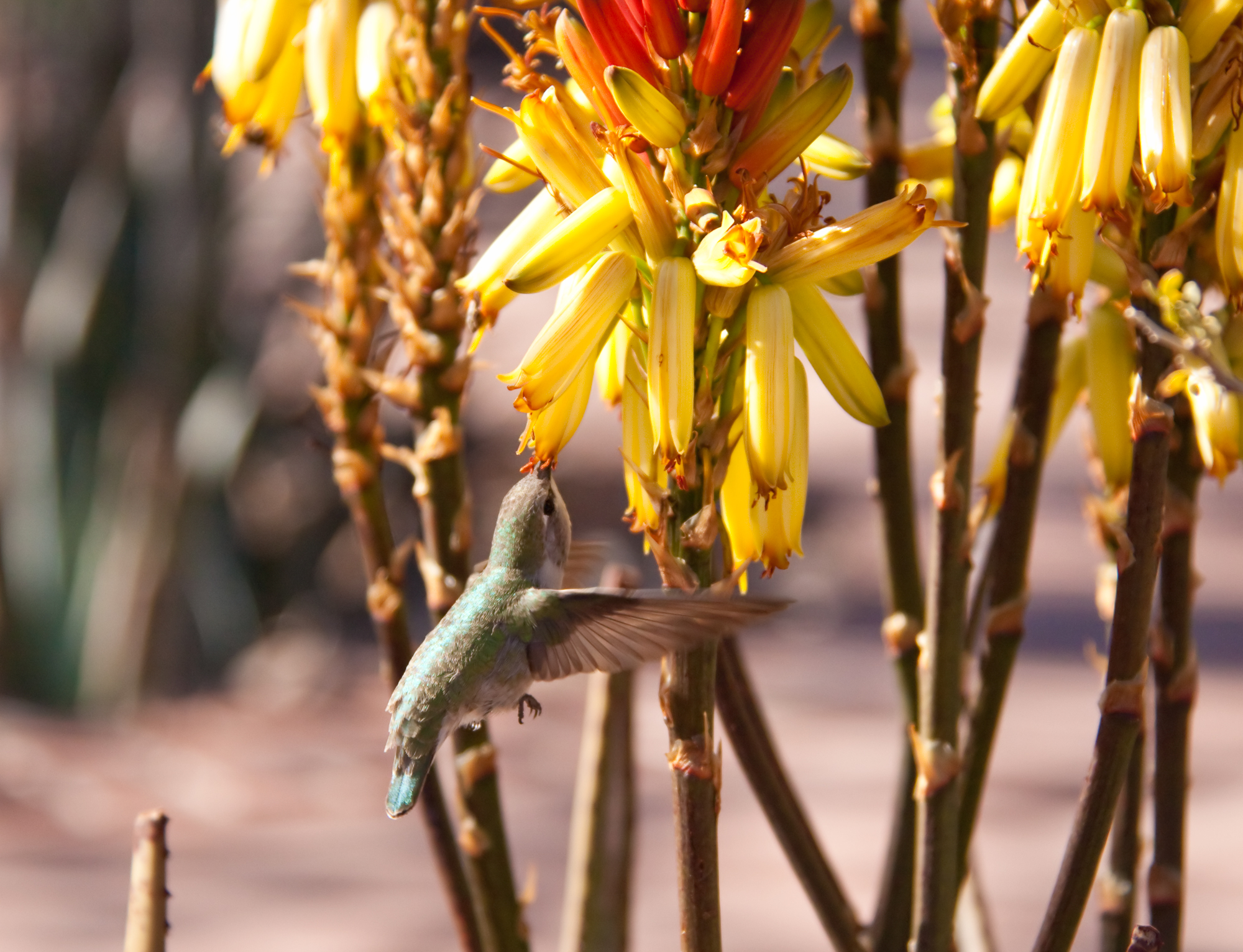
Female hovering

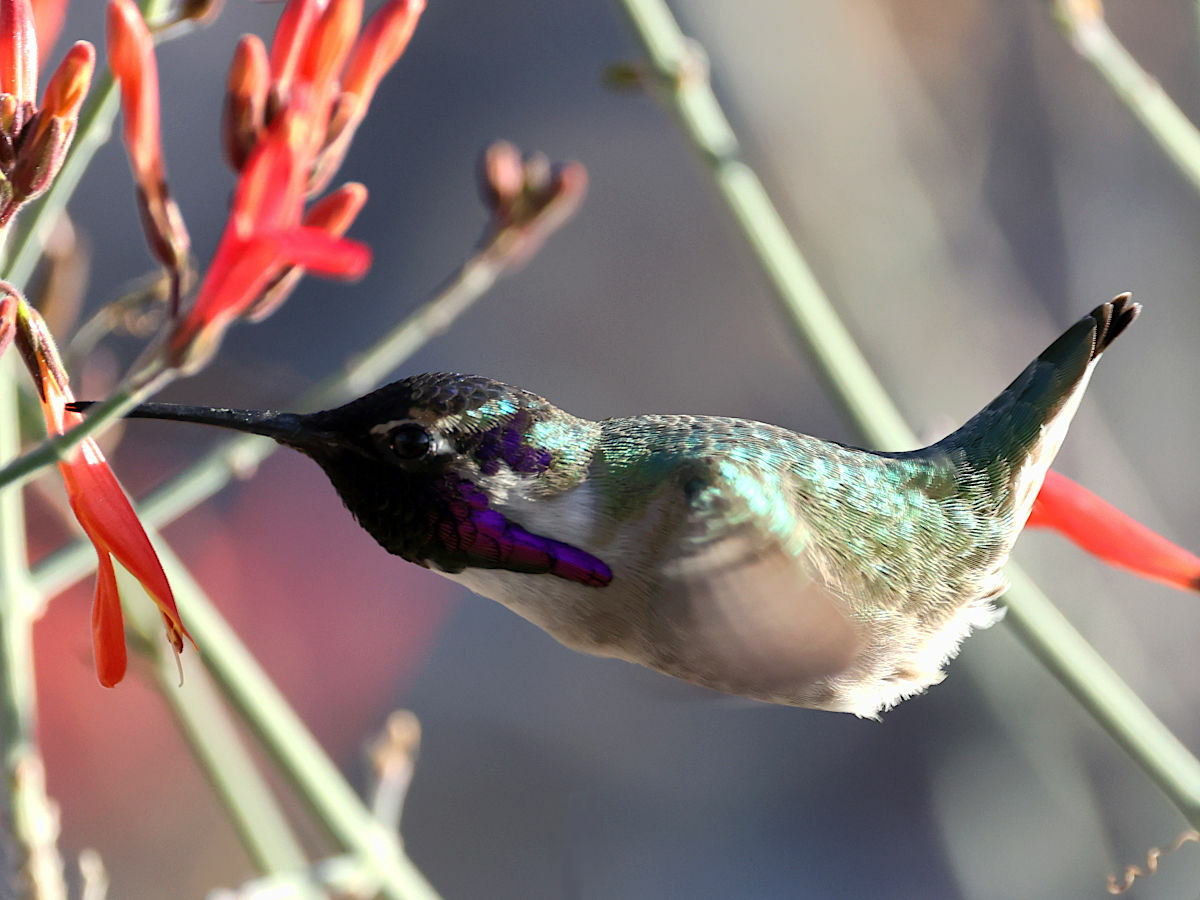
Male hovering

=== Torpor ===
As with other hummingbird species, the Costa's hummingbird can slow its metabolism during cold nights when it enters a hibernation-like state known as torpor, with its heart rate and respiration slowing substantially.

== Conservation ==
The IUCN describes them as of least concern. The population is stable and there are no known threats. They are found in at least one protected area.
