= François Descostes =

Lawyer, french politician

- Born: 21 March 1846; Rumilly, Kingdom of Sardinia
- Died: 24 August 1908 (aged 62); Chambéry

François Descostes (21 March 1846 – 24 August 1908) was a Savoyard writer, lawyer, and politician.

== Biography ==
François Descostes, son of Joseph Descostes and Hortense de Livet, was born in Rumilly in 1846. In 1866, after finishing law school, he settled as a lawyer in Chambéry, the capital of the Duchy of Savoy. Descostes was elected in 1873 to the Academy of Savoy, where he became president (from 1886 to 1887 and then from 1900 to 1908). He was a recognized authority on Joseph de Maistre. He was also winner of the Académie française's Thérouane prize.

== Works ==
- Trois jours en Savoie (1877)
- La Petite France et la Grande France (1886)
- Joseph de Maistre avant la Révolution: Souvenirs de la Société d'autrefois, 1753-1793 (2 vol., 1893)
- Joseph de Maistre Orateur (1896)
- La Révolution Française vue de l'Étranger 1789-1799, Mallet du Pan à Berne & à Londres (with a preface by Charles-Albert Costa de Beauregard, 1897)
- Des Alpes au Niger. Souvenirs d'un marsouin (with a preface by Ernest Daudet, 1898)
- Les Émigrés en Savoie et dans le Pays de Vaud, 1790-1800 (1903)
