= Pantaléon Costa de Beauregard =

French ornithologist (1806–1864)

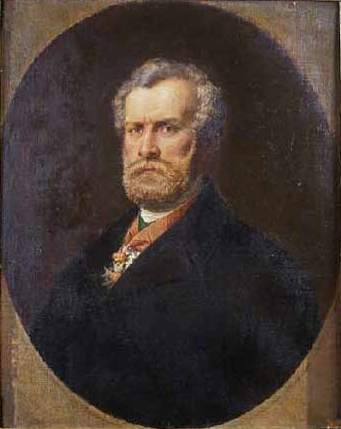
- Portrait of the Marquis by Benoît-Hermogaste Molin

President of the Academy of Sciences, Fine Letters and Arts of Savoie
- In office 1858–1864
- Preceded by: Auguste de Juge
- Succeeded by: Amédée Greyfié de Bellecombe

President of the General Council of Savoie
- In office 1860–1864
- Preceded by: Inaugural holder
- Succeeded by: Charles Dupasquier

Personal details
- Born: Louis Marie Pantaléon Costa de Beauregard; 19 June 1806; Bouvesse-Quirieu
- Died: 19 September 1864 (aged 58); La Motte-Servolex
- Spouse: Marthe Augustine de Saint-Georges de Vérac (m. 1834)
- Children: 11, including Charles

Louis Marie Pantaléon Costa, Marquis de Beauregard (19 June 1806 – 19 September 1864) was a French statesman, archaeologist, historian and ornithologist.

== Early life ==
Costa de Beauregard was born at Bouvesse-Quirieu on 19 June 1806. He was the eldest son, and third child, of Henri Maurice Victor François Régis Costa, Marquis de Beauregard (1779–1836) and Catherine Élisabeth de Quinson (1785–1832).

He was a grandson of Joseph Henry Costa de Beauregard, who was raised Marquis de Beauregard by the Duke of Savoy (King Victor Amadeus II) in 1700 by letters patent.

== Career ==
Costa was a member of the Savoyard nobility and a diplomat in Sardinia, friend and aide to King Charles Albert (who served as the King of Sardinia from 1831 until his abdication in March 1849 in favor of his eldest son, Victor Emmanuel II).

He was a member of the Académie des sciences, belles-lettres et arts de Savoie (1828) and was made a Commander of the Legion of Honour and a Knight of the Order of Saints Maurice and Lazarus. As an ornithologist he was an avid collector, especially of hummingbirds. Costa's hummingbird was named in his honour by Jules Bourcier.

=== Political career ===
Beauregard refused a seat in the Senate proposed by Emperor Napoleon III in 1860, however, he became general councilor of the canton of Chambéry-Nord (in the Arrondissement of Chambéry) the same year and was elected president of the new General Council of Savoie, holding these offices until his death in 1864.

In his role as president of the Council, and together with Baron Frédéric d'Alexandry d'Orengiani (the mayor of Chambéry and the first Senator of Savoie, he welcomed Napoleon III and Empress Eugénie on 27 August 1860 during the imperial trip to Savoy. During their visit, a ball was given in their honor at the city theater, and the marquis danced with the Empress.

== Personal life ==
On 12 May 1834, he was married to Marthe Augustine de Saint-Georges de Vérac (1812–1884), the youngest daughter of Euphémie de Noailles (a daughter of Louis Marc Antoine de Noailles, Viscount of Noailles) and Olivier de Saint-Georges de Vérac, Marquis de Vérac, a maréchal de camp who served as governor of the Château de Versailles. Together, they were the parents of eleven children, including:

- Charles-Albert-Marie Costa, Marquis de Beauregard (1835–1909), who married Emilie Pourroy de l'Aubérivière de Quinsonas (1841–1929), a daughter of the Adolphe de Pourroy de l'Aubérivière, 4th Marquis de Quinsonas.
- Camille-Josselin-Marie-Victor Costa, Marquis de Beauregard (1836–1916), who married Béatrix Marie Antoinette Budes de Guébriant (1840–1898) in 1864.
- Count Armand-Marie-Henri-Olivier Costa de Beauregard (1838–1921), the former secretary of the embassy.
- Count Gabriel-Marie-Paul Costa de Beauregard (1839–1901), who married his cousin Marie-Pauline Herminie de Rougé, a daughter of Count Adolphe de Rougé and Marie de Saint-Georges de Vérac, in 1869.
- Count Camille-Jean-Adolphe-Marie Costa de Beauregard (1841–1910), Canon of Chambéry.
- Élisabeth Gasparine Marie Costa de Beauregard (1842–1843), who died young.
- François-Marie-Pantaléon Costa de Beauregard (1844–1844), who died young.
- Félicie-Louise-Marie Costa de Beauregard (1845–1893), who married Henri Fernand Jules de Prunelé, Marquis de Prunelé (1836–1897) of the Château de Trécesson in 1866.
- Alix-Fernande-Marie Costa de Beauregard (1847–1915), a member of the Daughters of Charity.
- Count Charles-Albert-Marie-Olivier Costa de Beauregard (1848–1870), a Second Lt. with the Lancers who died at the Battle of Sedan during the Franco-Prussian War.
- Marie-Antoinette-Charlotte-Stéphanie (1850–1875), who married Arthur-Ettiene de Lancrau, Count de Bréon (1843–1904), in 1872.

Beauregard died on 19 September 1864 at La Motte-Servolex. He was succeeded in the marquisate by his eldest son, Charles.

=== Descendants ===
Through his eldest son Charles, he was a grandfather of Léontine Marie Eugénie Costa de Beauregard (1866–1944), who married Armand Edouard Marie Georges, Prince de Broglie-Revel (1856–1942).

Through his second son Josselin, he was grandfather of Ferdinand-François-Marie-Pantaléon-Victurnien Costa, Marquis de Beauregard (1865–1953), who married Marie-Madeleine-Emilie-Victorine-Augustine Crombez in 1886.
