= Charles Costa de Beauregard =

French historian and politician

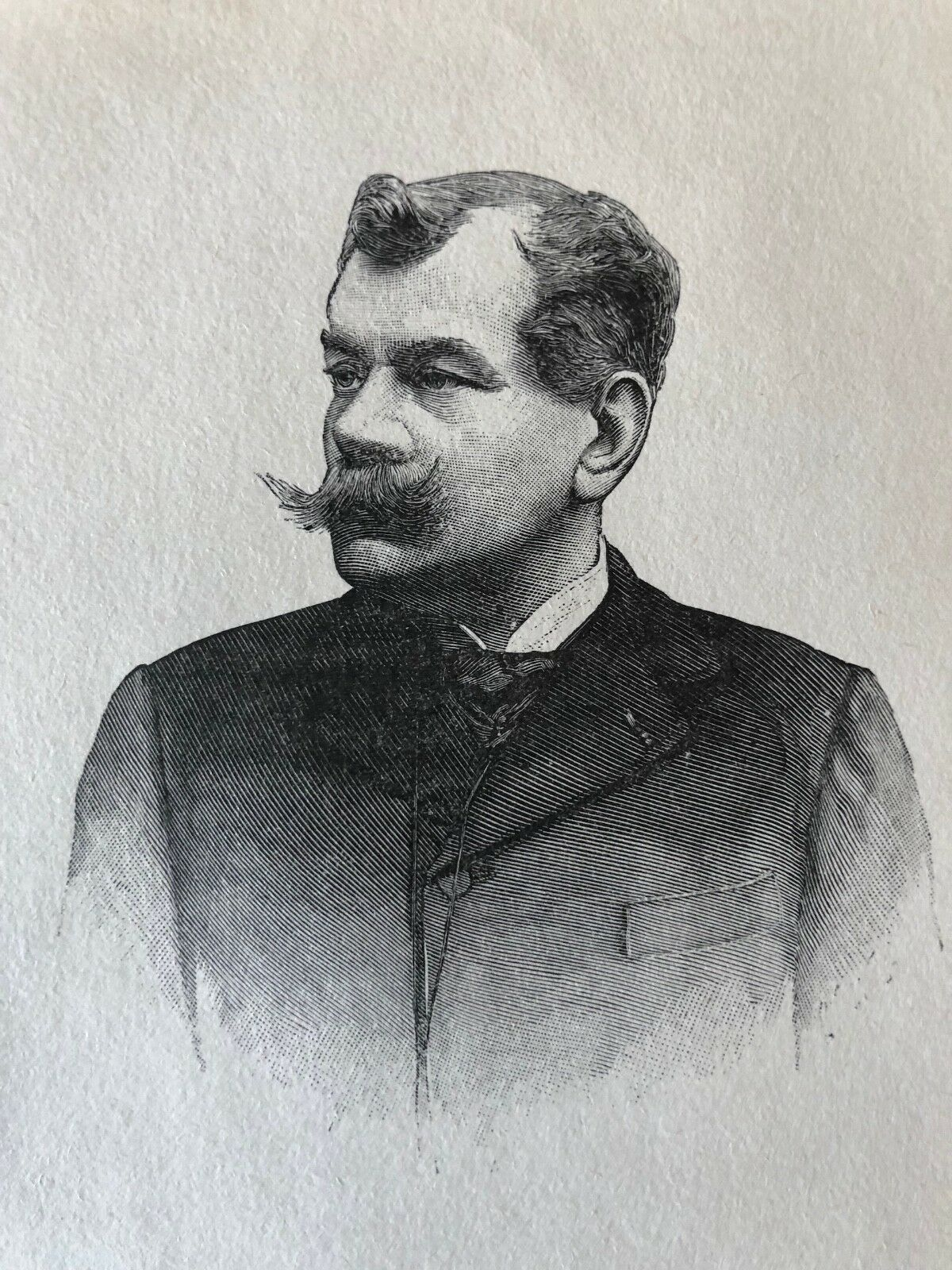
- The Marquis de Beauregard, c. 1899
- Born: Charles-Albert-Marie Costa de Beauregard; 24 May 1835; La Motte-Servolex, Savoie, Kingdom of Sardinia
- Died: 15 February 1909 (aged 73); Paris, France
- Spouse: Emilie Pourroy de l'Aubérivière de Quinsonas (m. 1860)
- Parent(s): Pantaléon Costa de Beauregard; Marthe Augustine de Saint-Georges de Vérac
- Relatives: Olivier de Saint-Georges de Vérac (grandfather)
- Awards: Legion of Honour

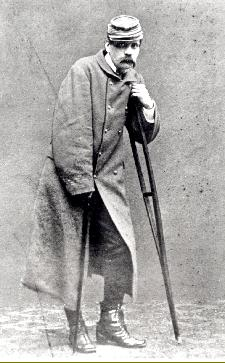
Costa de Beauregard, after being wounded at the Battle of Bethancourt in 1871.

Charles-Albert-Marie Costa, Marquis de Beauregard (24 May 1835 – 15 February 1909) was a French historian and politician. He also fought in the Franco-Prussian War. His works include a trilogy on Charles Albert of Sardinia.

== Early life ==
Costa de Beauregard was born at La Motte-Servolex on 24 May 1835. He was the eldest son of Louis Marie Pantaleon Costa, Marquis de Beauregard (1806–1864) and the former Marthe Augustine de Saint-Georges de Vérac, who married in 1834. His brother was Gabriel-Marie-Paul, Count Costa de Beauregard (who married their cousin Marie-Pauline Herminie de Rougé).

His paternal grandparents were Victor Costa de Beauregard and Elisabeth de Quinson. His maternal grandparents were Olivier de Saint-Georges de Vérac, Marquis de Vérac (a maréchal de camp and Governor of the Château de Versailles) and Euphémie de Noailles (a daughter of Louis Marc Antoine de Noailles, Viscount of Noailles). He was a great-grandson of Joseph Henry Costa de Beauregard, who was raised Marquis de Beauregard by the Duke of Savoy (King Victor Amadeus II) in 1700 by letters patent.

== Career ==
After being educated in Belgium, Beauregard was general counsel of Savoie from the time of the annexation of the Duchy of Savoy to France on 14 June 1860, following the signature of the Treaty of Turin on 24 March 1860, after which he lived in Paris. He participated in the Franco-Prussian War (which took place between July 1870 to January 1871) as commander of the 1st bataillon des mobiles de la Savoie, and he was wounded and taken prisoner during the Battle of the Lisaine in January 1871. From 1871 to 1876, he was a member of Parliament for Savoy.

=== Historian and writer ===
After the war, he retired from politics to devote himself to his writing on the subject of his family history, Savoy and the monarchy. Beauregard's most important works are a trilogy on King Charles Albert of Savoy, and Historical Memoirs of the Royal House of Savoy, based on documents held in his family archive and which was a completion of the work begun by his grandfather in 1816.

He was a member of the Académie des sciences, belles-lettres et arts de Savoie, and its president from 1887 to 1889. He was elected member of the Académie française in 1896, and was a Chevalier of the Legion of Honor.

== Personal life ==
On 16 April 1860, Emilie Pourroy de l'Aubérivière de Quinsonas (1841–1929), a daughter of the Adolphe de Pourroy de l'Aubérivière, 4th Marquis de Quinsonas. He lived at the Château de la Motte. Together, they were the parents of two daughters, including:

- Marie-Euphémie Costa de Beauregard (b. 1861), who married Marie-Alexandre-Eugéne-Ambroise Pantin, Count de Landemont in 1882.
- Léontine Marie Eugénie Costa de Beauregard (1866–1944), who married Armand-Edouard-Marie-Georges, Prince de Broglie-Revel (1856–1942) in 1886.

Beauregard died on 15 February 1909 in Paris. He was succeeded in the marquisate by his younger brother, Josselin.

== Publications ==
- Un homme d'autrefois, souvenirs recueillis par son arrière-petit-fils (1878)
- Mémoires historiques sur la maison royale de Savoie et sur les pays soumis à sa domination, depuis le commencement du XIe siècle jusqu'à l'année 1800 (1888)
- Un héritier présomptif. La jeunesse du roi Charles-Albert (1888)
- Prologue d'un règne. La jeunesse du roi Charles-Albert (1889)
- Épilogue d'un règne. Milan, Novare et Oporto. Les dernières années du roi Charles-Albert (1890)
- Le Roman d'un royaliste sous la Révolution. Souvenirs du Comte de Virieu (1892)
- Prédestinée (1896)
- Émigration, souvenirs tirés des papiers du Cte A. de La Ferronnays (1777-1814) (1900)
- Courtes Pages (1902)
- Liberté, égalité, fraternité (1904)
- Amours de sainte : Mme Loyse de Savoye, récit du XVe siècle (1907)
- Pages d'histoire et de guerre (1909)
