= Rumilly, Haute-Savoie =

Rumilly Remelyi (Savoyard)
- Commune
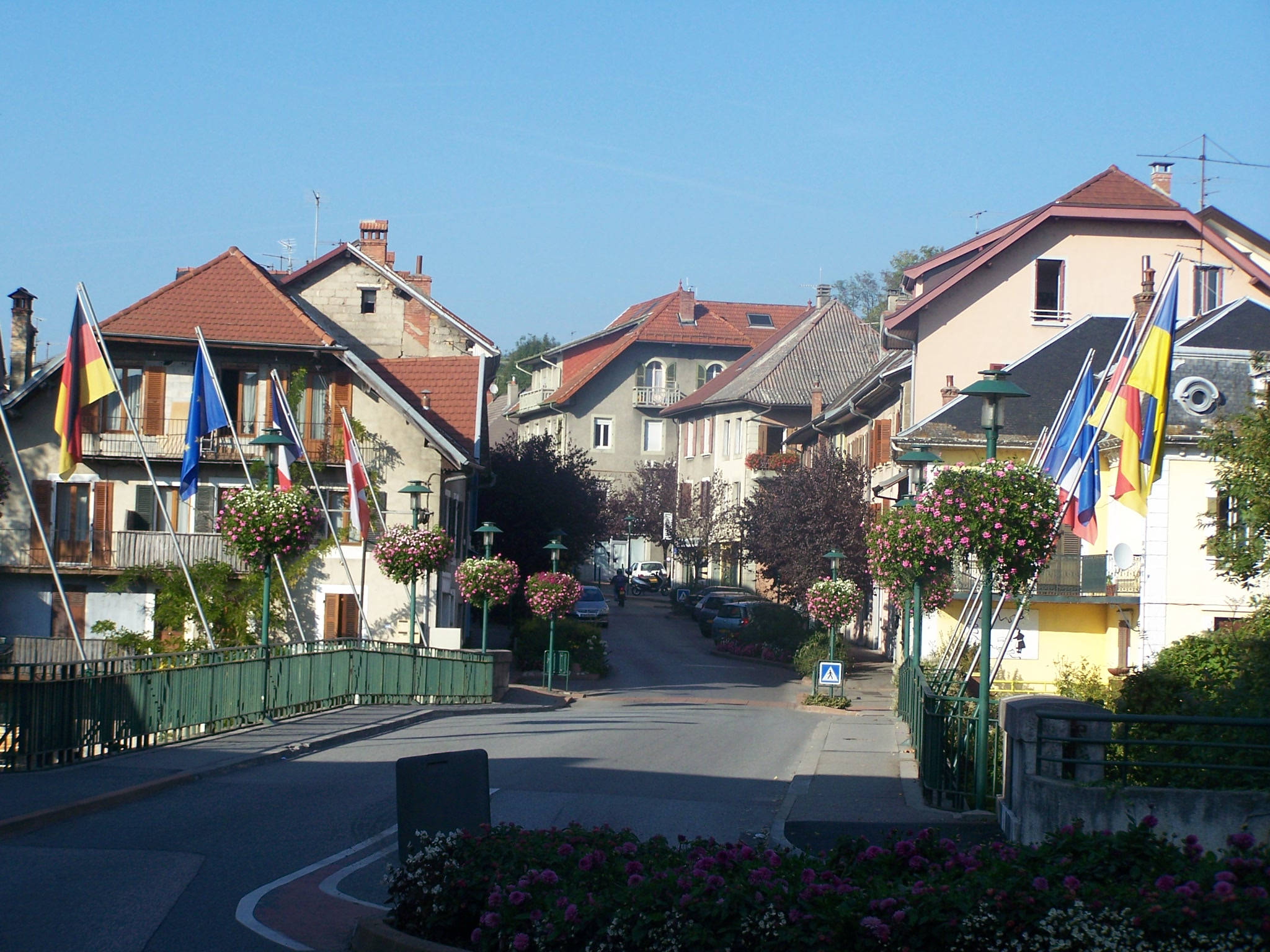
- The Pont-Neuf bridge crossing the Chéran river

- Coat of arms
- Location of Rumilly
- Location within France Location within Auvergne-Rhône-Alpes
- Coordinates: 45°52′33″N 5°56′41″E
- Country: France
- Region: Auvergne-Rhône-Alpes
- Department: Haute-Savoie
- Arrondissement: Annecy
- Canton: Rumilly
- Intercommunality: Rumilly Terre de Savoie

Government
  - Mayor (2023–2026): Christian Dulac
- Area^{1}: 16.89 km^{2} (6.52 sq mi)
- Highest elevation: 589 m (1,932 ft)
- Lowest elevation: 312 m (1,024 ft)
- Population (2023): 16,442
  - Density: 973.5/km^{2} (2,521/sq mi)
- Demonym: Rumilliens / Rumilliennes
- Time zone: UTC+01:00 (CET)
  - Summer (DST): UTC+02:00 (CEST)
- INSEE/Postal code: 74225 /74150
- ^{1} French Land Register data, which excludes lakes, ponds, glaciers > 1 km^{2} (0.386 sq mi or 247 acres) and river estuaries.

Rumilly (French pronunciation: [ʁymiji]; Savoyard: Remelyi) is a commune in the Haute-Savoie department in the Auvergne-Rhône-Alpes region in south-eastern France.

== Geography ==
The Chéran forms part of the commune's eastern border, crosses the village, flows north-northwestward through the northern part of the commune, then flows into the Fier, which forms part of its northern border. Rumilly forms an urban unit with the adjacent, smaller commune Sales.

=== Climate ===
Rumilly has an oceanic climate (Köppen Cfb) in spite of its relatively far inland position. Influenced by its elevation, summers are rather moderate on average, although they can be highly variable with extreme heat spikes. Winters see occasional freezing temperatures, but most often stays in the single-digits during daytime with frequent cold rain. Air frosts are normal during the night and snowfall is not uncommon.

== Population ==
Historical population
Year	Pop.	±% p.a.
1968	6,420	—
1975	7,379	+2.01%
1982	8,863	+2.65%
1990	9,991	+1.51%
1999	11,230	+1.31%
2007	13,434	+2.27%
2012	13,877	+0.65%
2017	15,379	+2.08%
2023	16,442	+1.12%
Source: INSEE

== Politics ==
Christian Dulac is the current mayor of Rumilly, elected in 2023.

== History ==
The commune's football club Rumilly-Vallières made it to the semi-finals of the 2020–21 Coupe de France for the first time in their history after beating Toulouse 2-0, whilst playing in the Championnat National 2, the fourth tier of the French football league system. The victory was described as the "greatest feat" in Rumilly-Vallières's history by L'Équipe. They exited the competition after a 5-1 defeat to Ligue 1 side Monaco.

== Twinning ==
Rumilly is twinned with Michelstadt, Germany and Maglie, Italy

== Notable people ==
- François Descostes (1846–1908) - writer

== See also ==
- Communes of the Haute-Savoie department
- Football Club Sportif Rumilly
