= Olivier de Saint-Georges de Vérac =

Armand-Maximilien-François-Joseph-Olivier de Saint-Georges, viscount and marquis of Vérac, was French soldier and politician of the eighteenth and nineteenth centuries. He was born on August 1, 1768, in Paris and died on August 13, 1858, in his château in Temblay-sur-Mauldre.

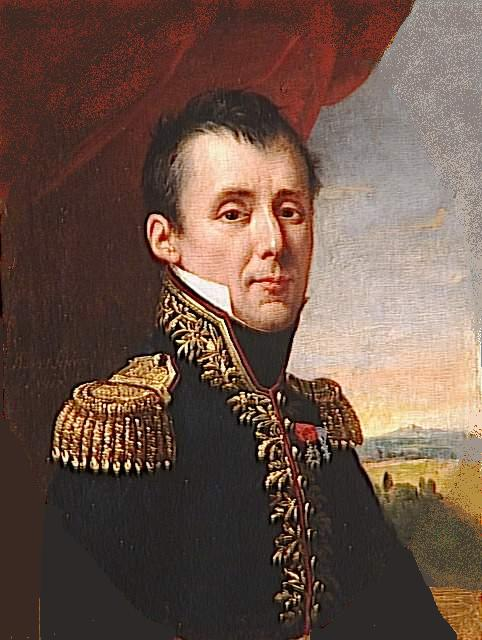
Olivier de Saint-Georges de Vérac

== Biography ==
The fourth son of the Marquis of Vérac, Olivier de Saint-Georges was born in Paris on August 1, 1768.

As heir of the Saint-George family, he began preparing for his role in the family by becoming one of the king's bodyguards at the age of fifteen. In 1786, he became second lieutenant in the royal carabineers and graduated to the role of captain in 1788. His career was halted by the French Revolution.

== Emigration ==
He traveled to Soleure with his father, the King of France's ambassador to Switzerland, where he met the baron of Breteuil, Louis Auguste Le Tonnelier de Breteuil, who was a former minister of the king and had lived with the Saint-Georges family since he emigrated. The baron of Breteuil chose the young de Vérac to be his secretary and assist him in his correspondences with the king and diplomats abroad. De Vérac was even sent as a dispatcher to Paris, thus learning secrets unknown to even his father.

After learning of the King's arrest, the young man remained at his post and continued to work with the baron of Breteuil to save the king and queen.

After the execution of Louis XVI, de Vérac followed the baron of Breteuil to Brussels then traveled abroad. In 1796, he, along with the staff of Wurmser, followed the Italian campaign. The viscount of Vérac, who was not listed by name on any emigration lists, returned to France in 1799.

== First Empire ==
In 1807, de Vérac was exiled to Belgium by the Emperor, who put him under the supervision of administrative authority for several years. He returned definitively to France in 1809.

In 1809, he married Euphémie de Noailles, the daughter of the viscount of Noailles, who had died in 1804.

== French Restoration ==
After the abdication of Fontainebleau, de Vérac saluted the return of Bourbon family, who remembered his devotion to Louis XVI.

On August 24, 1814, he was named knight of Saint-Louis as he received the Order of Saint-Louis. He was also named a member of the General Council of Seine-et-Oise. He was named a Peer of France on August 17, 1815.

De Vérac voted for execution in the trial of Michel Ney.

He consistently held a position of high power in the upper chamber.
