= List of learned societies of Savoy =

Academies in Savoy

The list of learned societies of Savoy includes the regional and local learned societies, often referred to as academies, located within the territory of Savoy.

== History ==
The creation of these academies between 1815 and 1860 followed the return of the territories of the Duchy of Savoy to the sovereignty of the House of Savoy after the fall of the First French Empire.

These societies brought together local elites, including professionals, clergy, and aristocrats, and served as spaces for the expression of a distinct cultural identity within the Sardinian state.

Following the Treaty of Turin and the annexation of Savoy to France, learned societies played an increasing role in the preservation of local heritage and history. They contributed to the affirmation of the historian André Palluel-Guillard identity within the French state and are regarded by historians as an early expression of regionalism in response to national centralization.

From 1878 onward, the principal academies and learned societies in Savoy began organizing regular meetings in the form of congresses to present and share their work. The primary objective of these congresses was to maintain historical and cultural connections among the former provinces that make up Savoy. These gatherings have been held on a biennial basis, providing a structured forum for the exchange of research and the reinforcement of regional scholarly networks.

The federation of the learned societies of Savoy developed over several stages. In 1899, a proposal was made to unite the learned societies of Savoy with those of the neighboring regions of Dauphiné and Vivarais. According to the "Summary Report 1928–1929–1930" of the Memoirs of the Academy of Sciences, Humanities and Arts of Savoy (1931), discussions about the creation of a federation continued, despite concerns over organizational and logistical issues. On 15 April 1930, an assembly of several learned societies—including the Academy of Savoy, the Natural History Society of Savoy, the Savoyard Society of History and Archaeology, the Florimontane Academy (Annecy), the Academy of the Val d'Isère, the Society of History and Archaeology of Maurienne, the Salesian Academy, and the Chablaisian Academy—was held at the ducal castle in Chambéry to establish the Federation of the Learned Societies of Savoy. The initiative, however, was not successful.

The statutes for a future Union of the Learned Societies of Savoy were first discussed on 24 October 1970 in Albertville. The association, Union of the Learned Societies of Savoy, was officially established on 9 April 1971, with its headquarters in Chambéry.

By 2011, membership across the affiliated societies was estimated to be between 2,000 and 3,000 individuals.

== Congress of the learned societies of Savoy (since 1878) ==
In the early years (1878–1888), the academies and learned societies met annually to present and discuss their work. From 1888 onward, these meetings were held biennially, except during periods of historical disruption between 1905–1937 and 1938–1964.

List of Congresses of Learned Societies (1878–present)
List of congresses of the Learned Societies of Savoy, including the location, date, theme, and publication of the proceedings.
- 1st Congress in Saint-Jean-de-Maurienne (1878). (Proceedings published in 1879)
- 2nd Congress in Annecy (1879). (Proceedings published in 1880)
- 3rd Congress in Chambéry (1880). (Proceedings published in 1881)
- 4th Congress in Moûtiers (1881). (Proceedings published in 1882)
- 5th Congress in Aix-les-Bains (1882). (Proceedings published in 1883)
- 6th Congress in Albertville (1883). (Proceedings published in 1883)
- 7th Congress in Montmélian (1885). (Proceedings published in 1886)
- 8th Congress in Thonon-les-Bains (1886). (Proceedings published in 1886)
- 9th Congress in Pont-de-Beauvoisin (1887). (Proceedings published in 1888)
- 10th Congress in Rumilly (1888). (Proceedings published in 1889)
- 11th Congress in Chambéry (1890). (Proceedings published in 1891)
- 12th Congress in La Roche-sur-Foron (1892). (Proceedings published in 1894)
- 13th Congress in Aiguebelette (1894). (Proceedings published in 1895)
- 14th Congress in Évian-les-Bains (1896). (Proceedings published in 1897)
- 15th Congress in Chambéry (1899). (Proceedings published in 1900)
- 16th Congress in Annecy (1901). (Proceedings published in 1902)
- 17th Congress in Aix-les-Bains (1905). (Proceedings published in 1906, available online on Gallica)
- 18th Congress in Chambéry (1937). (Proceedings not published)
- 19th Congress in Annecy (1938). (Proceedings published in 1938)
- 20th Congress in Moûtiers (1964). (Proceedings published in 19xx)
- 21st Congress in Thonon-les-Bains (1966). (Proceedings published in 1970)
- 22nd Congress in Saint-Jean-de-Maurienne (1968). Theme: "Cultural and Artistic Life in Savoy Through the Ages" (Proceedings published in 1972)
- 23rd Congress in Bonneville (1970). (Proceedings not published)
- 24th Congress in Chambéry (1972)
- 25th Congress in Annecy (1974). Theme: "Trades and Industry in Savoy" (Proceedings published in 1977)
- 26th Congress in Conflans (1976). Theme: "Daily Life in Savoy" (Proceedings published in 1979)
- 27th Congress in Thonon-les-Bains (1978). Theme: "Urbanism and Architecture in Savoy" (Proceedings published in 1982)
- 28th Congress in Saint-Jean-de-Maurienne (1980). Theme: "Soldiers and Armies in Savoy" (Proceedings published in 1981)
- 29th Congress in Samoëns (1982). Theme: "Social Life of the Savoyards" (Proceedings published in 1983)
- 30th Congress in Le Bourget-du-Lac (1984). Theme: "Savoy: Identity and Influences" (Proceedings published in 1984)
- 31st Congress in Annecy (1986). Theme: "Religious Life in Savoy" (Proceedings published in 1988)
- 32nd Congress in Moûtiers (1988). Theme: "Notables and Notability in the Lands of Savoy" (Proceedings published in 1990, available online on Gallica)
- 33rd Congress in Thônes (1990). Theme: "Countryside, Forests, and Alpine Pastures of Savoy, 13th–20th Century" (Proceedings published in 1992)
- 34th Congress in Saint-Jean-de-Maurienne (1992). Theme: "Women in Savoyard Society" (Proceedings published in 1993)
- 35th Congress in La Roche-sur-Foron (1994). Theme: "Savoyard Heritage" (Proceedings published in 1995)
- 36th Congress in Montmélian (1996). Theme: "Savoyard Society and War: Eight Centuries of History (13th–20th Century)" (Proceedings published in 1998)
- 37th Congress in Thonon-les-Bains (1998). Theme: "Art and Artists in Savoy" (Proceedings published in 2000)
- 38th Congress in Moûtiers (2000). Theme: "Savoy in Europe" (Proceedings published in 2002)
- 39th Congress in Archamps (2002). Theme: "Spaces, Borders, and Divisions" (Proceedings published in 2004)
- 40th Congress in Saint-Jean-de-Maurienne (2004). Theme: "Exchanges and Travel in Savoy" (Proceedings published in 2005)
- 41st Congress in La Roche-sur-Foron (2006). Theme: "Pleasures in Savoy" (Proceedings published in 2009)
- 42nd Congress in Albertville (2008). Theme: "The Savoyards and Tourism Since the Annexation" (Proceedings published in 2009)
- 43rd Congress in Annecy (2010). Theme: "Savoy and Its Neighbors in the History of Europe" (Proceedings published in 2010)
- 44th Congress in Chambéry (2012). Theme: "Savoy and Literature" (Proceedings published in 2013)
- 45th Congress in Chambéry – University of Savoy (2014). Theme: "Savoy and the Entry into War in 1914"
- 46th Congress in Saint-Jean-de-Maurienne (2016). Theme: "State and Institutions, on the 600th Anniversary of the Elevation of the County of Savoy to a Duchy" (Proceedings published in 2017)
- 47th Congress in La Roche-sur-Foron (2018). Theme: "Territory and Its Organization in the States of Savoy"

== Union of the learned societies of Savoy ==
The Union of the Learned Societies of Savoy was established in October 1970 during a meeting in Albertville involving eight academies and learned societies. Its membership includes major regional organizations such as the Academy of Savoy, the Natural History Society of Savoy, the Florimontane Academy, the Savoyard Society of History and Archaeology, the Society of History and Archaeology of Maurienne, the Academy of the Val d'Isère, the Salesian Academy, the Chablaisian Academy, the Academy of Faucigny, the Friends of Old Annecy, and the Natural History Society of Haute-Savoie.

Additional local societies have since joined the founding members, including the Friends of Old Conflans, the Friends of Old Chambéry, the Friends of Viuz-Faverges, the Friends of Old Annecy, the Friends of Old Rumilly, the Friends of Old Sallanches, the Friends of Old Chamonix, the Association for the Preservation of Landscapes and Monuments of Haute-Savoie, the Semnoz Underground Hydrology Study Group, and the Friends of the Val de Thônes.

The aims of the association are:

- The organization of the periodic Congresses of the Learned Societies of Savoy, the coordination of their work, and the promotion of research deemed appropriate;
- The publication of unpublished scientific work presented at these congresses;
- Liaison, within the framework of these congresses, with departmental, regional, and national bodies likely to provide material and moral support for the organization of these congresses and the publication of their work.

The Union formalizes meetings that originated at the end of the nineteenth century. Biennial meetings continue to be held in different locations in Savoy, with specific themes included on the agenda.

== Learned societies and local societies ==
This list presents the various societies of Savoy according to the provincial division:

=== Savoie Propre ===
==== Learned societies ====
- The Academy of Savoy, Academy of Sciences, Humanities and Arts of Savoy, founded in 1820;
- The Savoyard Society of History and Archaeology (SSHA), founded in Chambéry in 1855;
- The Natural History Society of Savoy, founded in 1844 by Louis Rendu, a member of the Academy of Savoy, and also by Jean-Baptiste Bailly;
- Savoyard Academy of Medical Sciences, founded in 1937;

==== Local societies ====
- Society of Art and History of Aix-les-Bains and its region, founded in 1993;
- Society of the Friends of Old Chambéry (Chambéry), founded in 1933;
- Society of the Friends of Old Conflans (Savoy), founded in 1930;
- Association Connaissance du canton de Bourdeau, Le Bourget-du-Lac, La Chapelle du Mont du Chat, La Motte-Servolex (Val du Bourget);
- Association for the Promotion of the Beaufortain (Beaufortain), founded in 1973;
- Association for Research and Mutual Assistance in Savoyard Documents and Studies (AREDES), genealogical association of Savoy (Chambéry);
- Association of the Friends of Joseph and Xavier de Maistre (Chambéry), founded by Jacques Lovie, Jean Boissel, and Jean-Louis Darcel in 1975;
- Association of the Friends of Montmélian and its surroundings – Friends of Montmélian (Montmélian), founded in 1976;
- Lake Archaeology Center of Aix-en-Savoie (Aix-les-Bains), founded in 1975;
- Archaeological Research Group of the Combe de Savoie (Combe de Savoie), founded in 1975;
- Kronos, archaeology, history, and testimony of the Albanais concerning its part belonging to the department of Savoy, founded in 1986;
- Royal Circle of Savoy, founded in 2024;

=== Maurienne ===
- The Society of History and Archaeology of Maurienne, founded in 1856;
- The Academy of Maurienne, founded on 15 July 2008;

==== Local societies ====
- Maurienne Genealogy, founded in 1996;

=== Tarentaise ===
- The Academy of the Val d'Isère, founded in 1865;

==== Local societies ====
- The Society of History and Archaeology of Aime (Aime), founded in 1968;

=== Chablais ===
- The Chablaisian Academy, founded in 1886;
- The Institute of the Savoyard Language, founded in 2005;

==== Local societies ====
- French Association of Limnology;

=== Genevois ===
==== Learned societies ====
- The Florimontane Academy, founded in 1607 by Francis de Sales and President Antoine Favre, reactivated in 1851;
- The Salesian Academy, founded in 1878;
- La Salévienne, the Society of History of Northern Savoy (near Geneva), founded in 1984;
- The Fine Arts Society of Haute-Savoie, founded in 1909;

==== Local societies ====
- Genealogical Center of Savoy, founded in 1977;
- The Natural History Society of Haute-Savoie, founded by Henri Juge and François Plagnat in 1954;
- Society of the Friends of Old Annecy (Annecy), founded in 1932. Recognized as an "establishment of public utility" by decree on 10 September 1970;
- Friends of Viuz-Faverges (Faverges), founded in 1972, at the origin of the Viuz Museum;
- Friends of Old Rumilly and the Albanais (Rumilly, Albanais region), founded by Louis Buttin in 1954, at the origin of the Albanais Museum;
- Friends of the Val de Thônes, founded in 1975;
- Friends of Old Seynod (Seynod), founded in 1984;
- Society of History of the Pays de Fillière (Groisy), founded in 2003;
- Mycological and Botanical Association of Annecy;
- Dauphiné–Savoy Mycological and Botanical Federation;
- Rhône-Alpes Association of Friends of Saint James;
- Friends of Savoyard Mills;

=== Faucigny ===
- The Academy of Faucigny, founded in 1938;

==== Local societies ====
- Society of the Friends of Old Chamonix, Chamonix, founded in 1969;
- Friends of Old La Roche;
- Friends of the Grande Maison, in Contamine-sur-Arve, founded in 1994;
- Culture, History and Heritage of Passy and the Research and Study Center on the History of Assy, Passy;
- Association of Mechanical Music of Les Gets;

== See also ==
- History of Savoy
- Savoyard nationalism

== Bibliography ==
- Truchet, Pierre (1994). "Histoire des académies et sociétés savantes de Savoie" [History of the academies and learned societies of Savoy]. Savoie et région alpine [Savoie and the Alpine region] (in French). Paris: Actes du 116e Congrès national des sociétés savantes à Chambéry. pp. 7–15.
- Brachet, Francine; Ajacques, Jean-Paul (2017). "Les technologies numériques : instruments de création d'un réseau savant savoisien" [Digital technologies: tools for creating a Savoyard scholarly network]. Les acteurs du développement des réseaux [Network development stakeholders]. Actes des congrès nationaux des sociétés historiques et scientifiques (in French). Paris: Éditions du Comité des travaux historiques et scientifiques. pp. 27–34. ISBN 978-2-7355-0872-3.
