= History of Savoy =

The history of Savoy presents a synthesis of the various periods, from prehistory to the present day, of the geographical and historical entity known as Savoy, a territory whose definition has varied for historical periods, until it was defined by the two French departments of Savoie and Haute-Savoie.

According to Abbé Adolphe Gros, the territory of Savoie comprises the "country situated between the Rhône and the Alps, south of Lake Geneva and north of the Dauphiné ". Savoie thus forms a "solid block, a sort of thick tree trunk stretching 145 km from north to south, and swelling to a hundred km from east to west, covering an area of just over 10,000 km2". The region's varied landscapes are marked by Alpine influences, from the lowland Pre-Alps to the snow-capped peaks of the Alps, linked by large intra-Alpine valleys. These valleys are at the origin of the traditional provincial divisions: Savoie Propre, Maurienne, Tarentaise, Genevois, Faucigny and Chablais.

The region's history begins with prehistoric settlement, from the 16th millennium B.C. by hunter-gatherers to the sedentarization of lakeside cities. During its protohistory, which began around the middle of the 3rd millennium BC, the copper-rich subsoil enabled the development of a proto-industry producing artefacts, as well as commercial import circuits from Germanic regions. Gallic tribes such as the Allobroges, Ceutrons, Graiocèles and Médulles inhabited the area in the first centuries BC, before Roman intervention began in the 1st century BC. The Romans won their first victory over the Allobroges in 121 BC, then definitively in 62 BC. Other peoples were conquered from 16 to 7 BC. During the Gallo-Roman period, present-day Savoie corresponded to Sapaudie (Latin: Sapaudia), then occupied by the Burgundians, until its integration into Frank or Carolingian Saboia.

With the disappearance of the empire, then of the kingdom of Burgundy, great seigniorial families emerged - Humbertiens, then the House of Savoy, Géroldiens or the House of Geneva, Faucigny - and tried to increase their possessions and power (building the counties of Maurienne, then Savoy or Geneva). The Humbertians, established in the Maurienne region and at the origin of the future House of Savoy, gradually took control of the entire region, eliminating rival houses, and assumed the definitive title of Counts of Savoy from the eleventh century until they obtained the title of "Duke" in 1416. Control of the Alpine passes and slopes led to the traditional nickname of "Gatekeepers of the Alps". The House of Savoy gradually came to control a territory with shifting borders, stretching from German-speaking Switzerland to Nice, and from the gates of Lyon to the plain of Turin.

Increasingly looking "beyond the mountains" (i.e. across the Alps to Italy), the House of Savoy abandoned its cradle in favor of the Italian policy. Annexed for some, united for others, Savoy passed to neighboring France with the Treaty of Turin in 1860. A poor province at the start of the 19th century, Savoy grew thanks to the exploitation of white coal in the 19th century and the development of spa and winter tourism from the beginning of the 20th century, as well as the fine metallurgical industry, based on the watchmaking industry established in Faucigny as early as the 18th century, and the heavy industry in the Tarentaise and Maurienne valleys in the 19th century. These activities helped stop the hemorrhaging of immigrants. In the second half of the twentieth century, identity movements asserted a specific cultural identity, or even political sovereignty.

The land we call Savoie had a curious destiny: a land of empire in the Middle Ages, but divided from the outset between the call of the Rhône valley and that of the Po valley. Over the centuries, it was the cradle of a dynasty of French language and culture, but the fortunes of its history made it the mother of Italian unity, fighting at different times against the Dauphiné, against the Valais, against the Calvinist Geneva, against the Milan, and succeeding despite these incessant wars, It was for a long time a bone of contention between France and the Holy Roman Empire, then between France and Spain, and finally between France and Austria, and is now a link between the two friendly countries that occupy both sides of the Alps.

— André Chamson, Archives de l'ancien duché de Savoie,

== Prehistory ==
=== Stone Age ===
Key dates:
- 50,000 Neanderthal hunters in Chablais
- 13,000 The first reindeer hunters
- 5,000 First communities of sedentary farmers
- 2500/2000 BC Copper Age
- 2000/1350 BC Early and Middle Bronze Age: import of bronzes
- 1350/800 BC Late Bronze Age: metallurgy and lake cities
- 800/50 BC Iron Age: Hallstatians and Alpines
- 300 BC Settlement of the Allobroges
- 218 BC Crossing of the Alps by Hannibal, through Savoy according to some authors

During the Quaternary period, the Alps experienced periods of glacial flooding and recession. With the last advances of the Würm glaciation, the various traces disappeared. However, one site was spared, enabling the discovery of ancient traces of human presence in this region in a cave in the commune of Onnion, in the present-day département of Haute-Savoie. Located at an altitude of 1,900 m, in the cliffs of the Rocher Blanc, the Baré cave was the subject of several excavation campaigns in the 1950s. They uncovered flint tools and bones belonging to several animal species over a period ranging from 70,000 to 30,000 BC. Some examples are the bear and the cave lion, but also species still present such as the boreal lynx, the brown bear, the wolf, the fox, the badger, the marten, the red deer, the ibex, the chamois, the European hare, the marmot. Since 2013, the cave has been walled off to protect access and preserve the site.

The Rhône glacier, at the end of the last ice age, opened up Lake Geneva around 18,000/15,000 B.C. Between 15,000 and 6,000 B.C., excavations in the 19th and 20th centuries have attested to the presence of seasonal hunters. There are deposits from the Magdalenian, Azilian and Mesolithic periods. These reindeer and then deer hunters were present in the foreland (around 600 m altitude). At the foot of the Salève, in Étrembières near Geneva, the first Paleolithic work of art was found in 1843 and immediately recognized. There are caves or shelters at Musièges and La Balme-de-Thuy, Haute-Savoie, Saint-Thibaud-de-Couz and Saint-Christophe in Savoie, dating back between 13,000 and 6,000 years.

During the Neolithic period (between 5,000 and 2,500 BC), sedentary farming communities settled on the plains and in the major valleys at mid-altitude: numerous deposits attest to this. Excavations carried out in some forty municipalities along the lakeshore have uncovered forty-seven sites from this period and forty-four from the Bronze Age. These include, respectively, 4 and 2 sites on Lake Aiguebelette, 9 and 19 on Lake Bourget, 22 and 13 on Lake Léman and 12 and 10 on Lake Annecy.

The oldest remains, such as the Aime necropolis, date back to the Middle Neolithic.

In Thonon, on the shores of Lake Geneva, a Middle Neolithic necropolis of the "Chamblande type" was uncovered at a site known as Genevray in 2004. The site uncovered 220 burials, dated between 3,300 and 4,800 BC, i.e. from the middle of the 5th millennium BC to the end of the 4th millennium BC.

Other evidence of Alpine megalithic occupation includes hundreds of cup stones in the Tarentaise and Maurienne valleys at altitudes of over 2,000 m, such as the Pierre aux Pieds, at 2,750 m on the Pisselerand plateau, at 2,100 m, with 150 cupules, as well as the Pierre aux Chouettes or Pierre Chevète in Saint-Martin-de-Belleville, in the hamlet of Villarenger.

The Petit-Saint-Bernard pass (2,188 m) features a cromlech that is not necessarily Neolithic.

=== Protohistory ===
Copper was mined around 2500 BC, and found in the form of flat axes (Sevrier, Faverges, Saint-Pierre-d'Albigny and Maurienne).

The Early Bronze Age (2000/1600 BC) began with the first axes and pins imported from the Valais, an active production zone. These metallurgists exploited the copper deposits of the Upper Tarentaise.

In the Middle Bronze Age (1600/1350 BC), bronzes were again imported, but from southwest Germany.

From the 14th century B.C. onwards, imports from Germany continued, but local metal production gradually began under the major influence, probably even brought by migrants from Middle Europe, of the urnfield culture (Champs d'Urnes). A hot, dry climate led to a drop in lake levels, and by 1050 BC, they had set up metal and pottery workshops on the shores of these lakes, which were easily supplied with fuel by floating. These lakeside settlements lasted until the 7th century, when they were submerged by rising waters caused by a major climatic change. The most numerous of these were on Lac du Bourget, where abundant material is on display at the Musée Savoisien in Chambéry.

From the Middle Bronze Age onwards, the Alpine valleys were criss-crossed by a trade flow between the Po plain and Savoy, which received Italian bronzes (weapons and jewelry). Around 950 BC, the copper mines of the Maurienne were exploited by lake metallurgists.

During the Iron Age, from the 6th century B.C. onwards, Savoy was home to Hallstattian horse-breeders who settled in the plains, leaving their mark in burial mounds (Gruffy, Saint-Ferréol, Talloires, La Tour, etc.), while independent peoples from the late Bronze Age occupation flourished in the mountain valleys: the Ceutrons in Tarentaise and Faucigny, and the Medulles in Maurienne. They controlled and ensured trade between the Po plain and the Rhone valley, which brought them a wealth of original and abundant funerary jewelry, characteristic of a true "Alpine civilization".

Pre-Christian Alpine traditions date from this period (Austria, Switzerland, Savoy, Northern Italy, Slovenia), whose characters - Krampus, Berchta (Perchten), wild man - are part of an endangered, folklorized cultural heritage, on the verge of extinction due to the disappearance of traditional ways of life that have been preserved for longer in the Alps.

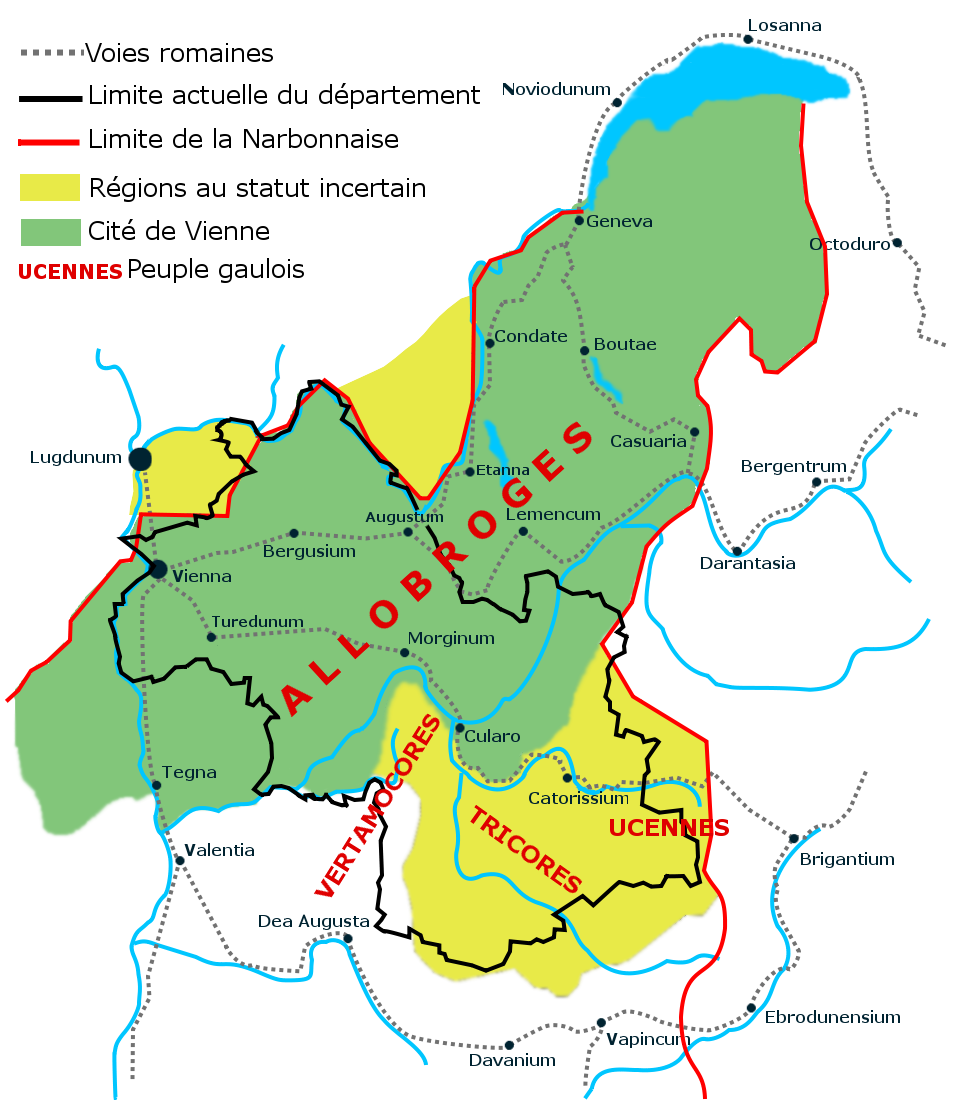
Map of the Allobroges territory.

The Gauls did not colonize Savoy until the 4th century BC, when they established a small settlement south of Lake Geneva. By the 2nd century, the Allobroges had occupied virtually all of the pre-Alpine plains: the area around Geneva and Lake Geneva, the Chambéry cluse, the Savoy combe, and so on. Further inland, in the valleys within the Alps, independent peoples were beginning to be Celtized, especially in the Tarentaise region, where the road to Italy passed, possibly the route taken by Hannibal when he crossed the Alps in 218 BC. The Ceutrons were found in the Tarentaise valley and upper Faucigny, the Médulles in the lower Maurienne and the Graiocèles in the upper Maurienne, most probably on Mont-Cenis (Col du Mont-Cenis).

== The Roman Savoy ==
This part of the Alps rebelled against Roman rule. The Roman conquest of Allobrogia took place in several stages between 122 and 60 BC.

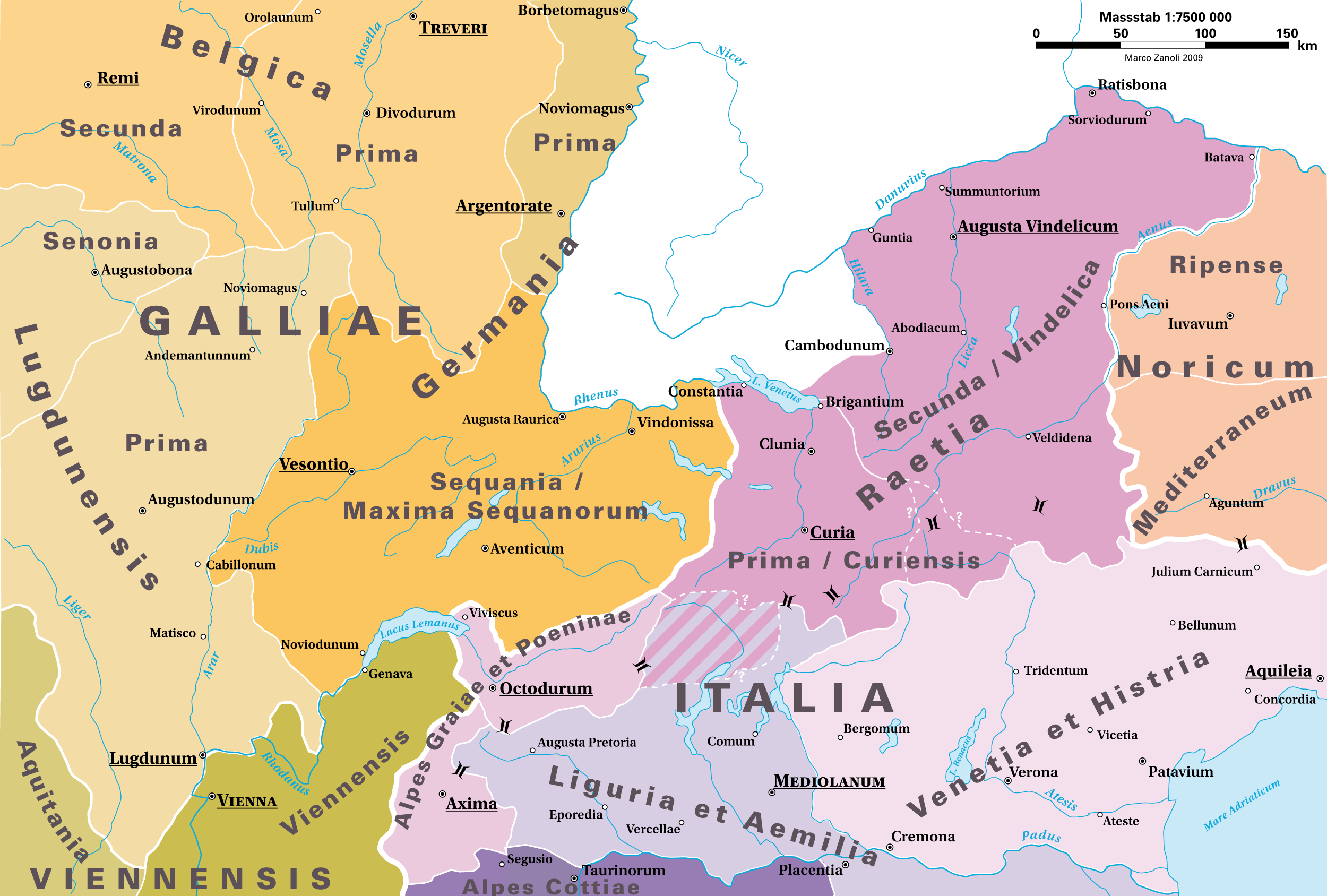
Partition of the Western Alps between the provinces of Gaul and Italy at the time of the Roman Empire, circa 395.

Key dates:
- 121 B.C. Allobroges defeat the Romans
- 9/-6 complete submission of the Alps

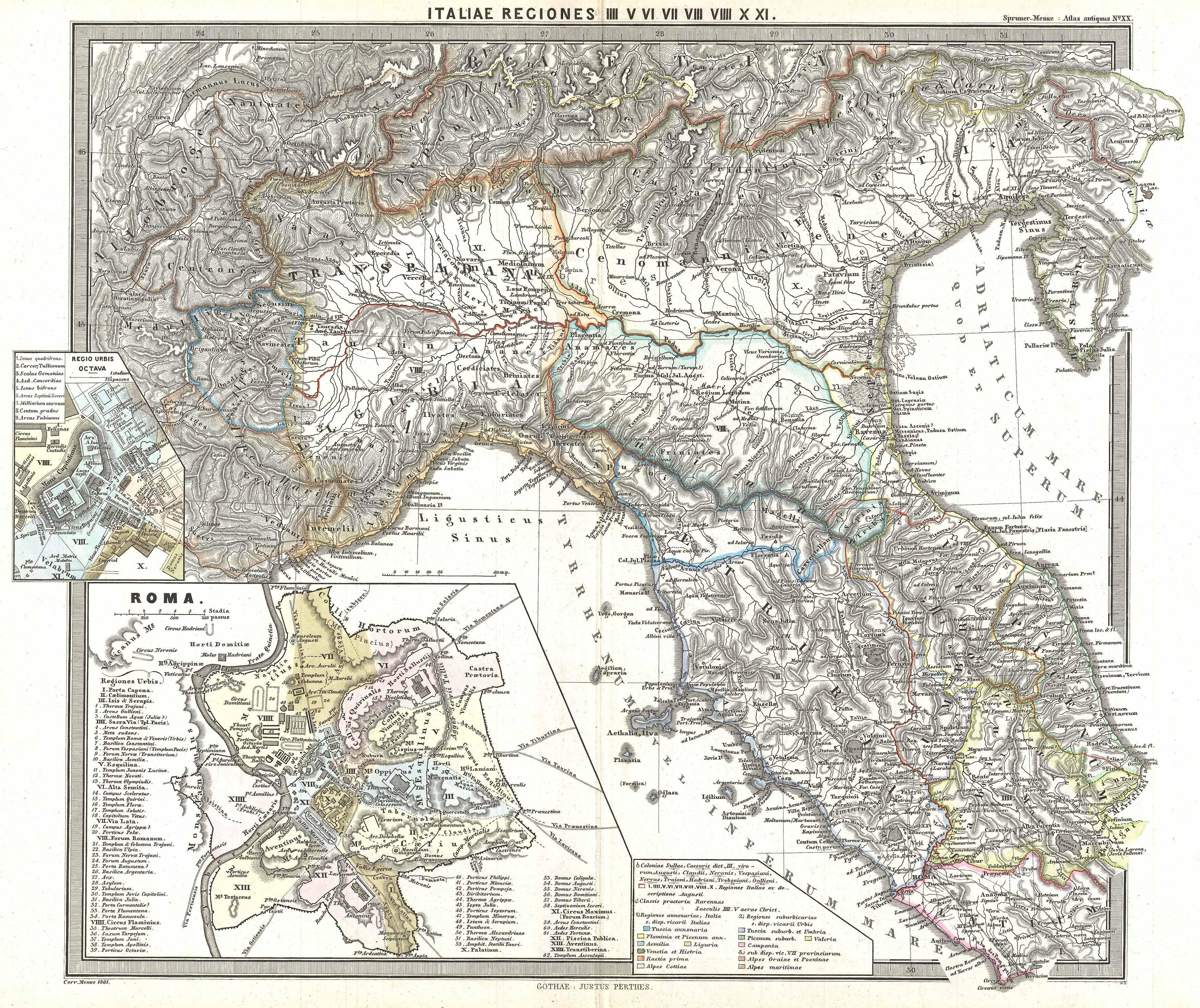
Map of Northern Italy under Augustus. The future Savoy divided between Italy and Gaul.

The Romanization of Savoy really began around 6-4 BC, when all the valleys were conquered and controlled, while the first contact with the Romans dates back to the crossing of the Alps by the consul Fulvius Flaccus around the Montgenèvre pass. The Savoy region was of strategic interest to the Romans, with passes and roads leading from the peninsula to Gaul, notably the one from Mediolanum (Milan) to Vienna (Vienne), crossing the French Tarentaise region. Roman Savoy lasted until the 2nd - 5th centuries, when Germanic peoples, the "Barbarians", made their first incursions into the territory, such as the Alemanni, followed by the final settlement of the Burgundians by general Aetius around 434.

== Medieval period: from the Burgundian kingdoms to the feudal societies of Savoy ==
In 443, Sapaudia was granted to the Burgundians. The Chronica Gallica (452) mentions their settlement.

Key dates:
- Early 11th century appearance of the Humbertians and Géroldians
- 1125 foundation of Hautecombe Abbey
- 1248, Mont Granier landslide
- 1388, surrender of Nice to Savoy, giving the county access to the Mediterranean.
- 1401, sale of the County of Geneva to the House of Savoy.
- 1416, Amédée VIII of Savoy is granted the title of Duke by Emperor Sigismund.

A Burgundian kingdom was established during the 5th and 6th centuries, but was unable to oppose Franks' claims. The Merovingians ( 6th - 7th centuries), then the Carolingians from the 7th century onwards, intervened in the region. With the demise of the Carolingian Empire, a kingdom of Burgundy came into being. The death of the last king of Burgundy, Rudolf III, gave rise to a war of succession, during which his nephew Eudes II de Blois contested the inheritance from the German emperor Conrad the Salic. In each camp, a representative of the region's two powerful emerging seigniorial families, the Count of Geneva Gérold, allied himself with the Count of Blois, while Count Humbert, former advisor and vassal of Rudolf III, took the imperial side. The Count of Geneva, supported by Archbishop Buchard of Lyon, was defeated by Count Humbert near the city of Geneva in 1034.

Léon Menabrea sums up the period with these words: "Little by little, the petty feudatories faded away; a star grew and blazed in the middle of the feudal firmament: the star of the House of Savoy". Through a policy of marriages and wars, the House of Savoy succeeded in controlling the whole of this ancient Sapaudia, giving birth to the county and then the duchy of Savoy from 1416 onwards.

== Modern period: from the Duchy of Savoy to the Kingdom of Sardinia (1416 to 1792) ==
The Duchy of Savoy and the other Italian states in 1494.

In 1416, the county of Savoy, under Amadeus VIII the Peaceful, and surrounded by the duchies of Milan and Burgundy and the French Dauphiné, was granted the status of duchy within the Holy Roman Empire by Emperor Sigismund. In 1418, the Duke of Savoy inherited the Italian province of Piedmont. Between French, German, Spanish and Austrian monarchies, the Savoyard sovereigns, through their alliances, became key players in Europe. In the legislative sphere, the brought order to the inextricable maze of local customs. This was the apogee of the Savoy States.

The end of Amadeus VIII's reign in 1440 ushered in a period of decadence that lasted until at least 1630, largely due to the duchy's inability to keep out of the conflicts between the great European powers. In 1475, during the Burgundian War, the duchy, an ally of Charles the Bold, lost several of its possessions. Berne and Fribourg, with the support of Lucerne, conquered the Pays de Vaud. On August 16, 1476, following the Duke of Burgundy's defeat at Grandson and Murten, the confederates returned most of the territory to the Duchy of Savoy for the sum of 50,000 florins (excluding the government of Aigle). In November, following its defeat at the Battle of La Planta at the hands of the Valaisans and its confederate allies, the Duchy lost control of the Lower Valais and the Grand-Saint-Bernard Pass, the gateway to the Mediterranean.

Savoy experienced five French occupations - in 1536–1559, 1600–1601, 1630–31, 1690–96 and 1703-1713 - and a Spanish occupation in 1742–49, not to mention the conquest of the Pays de Vaud by the Bernese and Fribourgeois in 1536, the occupation of western Chablais by the Bernese between 1536 and 1564 (bailliages of Thonon, Gex and Ternier-Gaillard, restored by the Treaty of Lausanne) and eastern Chablais (from Saint-Maurice to Evian) by the Valaisans between 1536 and 1569. At the Treaty of Thonon, Emmanuel-Philibert and the Valaisans renewed their mutual defense alliance, and the governments of Evian and the Vallée d'Aulps were returned to Savoy (while the Valais kept the former Chablais, i.e. the left bank of the Rhône below Massongex, as far as Saint-Gingolph).

In fact, France did not want Savoy to be annexed, but with the exception of Savoy, the duchy was gradually stripped of all its possessions west of the Alps: Bresse and Bugey, Pays de Gex (Treaty of Lyon, January 17, 1601, between Henri IV's France and Charles Emmanuel's Duchy of Savoy), Pays de Vaud north of Lake Geneva and Bas-Valais, so that the duchy's center of gravity increasingly shifted to the Italian side, leading in 1563 to the official relocation of the capital to Turin at the expense of Chambéry (a de facto move since 1536).

When the Protestant Reformation swept across Europe, Savoy remained predominantly Catholic, even though the Chablais region had, for a time, sided with the Protestants when it was occupied by the Bernese between 1536 and 1569. The Counter-Reformation was symbolized by François de Sales, a former lawyer and brilliant intellectual turned bishop, who set about reclaiming the Chablais.

In 1561, Emmanuel-Philibert of Savoy (1528–1580) promulgated the Edict of Rivoli of September 22, 1561, replacing the use of Latin in public documents with French in Savoy and the Aosta Valley, and with Italian in Piedmont and the county of Nice.

Even when peace was established on a lasting basis, Savoy remained a poor country where the majority of the peasant population often lived in precarious conditions. From the 16th century onwards, emigration to southern Germany and Lyon became a tradition. Village identity remained very strong, based in particular on the relatively large scale of communal property.

In 1713, Victor Amadeus II received the crown of Sicily, which he exchanged for Sardinia. Henceforth, the States of Savoy would also be known as the Kingdom of Sardinia or the "Sardinian Kingdom". Victor Amadeus II, who belonged to the generation of enlightened despots, managed his states soundly and implemented a series of reforms, some of which were ahead of their time, such as the Sardinian Map a 1:2400 cadastre designed to improve tax collection.

His successor, Victor-Amédée III of Sardinia, allowed Savoyard communities to buy back part of their seigneurial rights, which led to some resentment among the nobility.

== The French occupation of the duchy from 1792 to 1815 ==
The Italian States in 1796, Savoy in the Kingdom of Sardinia

In 1792, the French crossed the border once again, this time it was the revolutionaries. A National Assembly of the Allobroges, meeting in Chambéry, called for Savoy to be annexed to France. Annecy, on the other hand, preferred union with Italy. Savoy and its six provinces became the Department of Mont-Blanc on November 27, 1792 (part of which, along with Geneva, became the Department of Léman in 1798). Republican laws were applied in Savoy, but the Civil Constitution of the Clergy was poorly accepted.

From 1791 to 1793, the 7 districts (Annecy, Carouge, Chambéry, Cluses, Moûtiers, Saint-Jean-de-Maurienne and Thonon) of the Mont-Blanc department provided 5 battalions of national volunteers.

In 1794, Convention representative Antoine Louis Albitte, nicknamed the "Savoyard Robespierre", fought the enemies of the Revolution, but in the end, the guillotines built for the occasion were not used. On the other hand, repression of refractory priests lasted until the Concordat of 1801.

The Empire represented a period of calm after the turmoil of the Revolution, despite conscription, which remained unpopular. With the repurchase of national property, the urban bourgeoisie continued the rise it had begun in the eighteenth century. The fall of the Napoleonic Empire marked Savoy's return to the monarchical fold of the House of Savoy.

== From Restoration to Buon governo (good government) and Risorgimento (1815 to 1860) ==
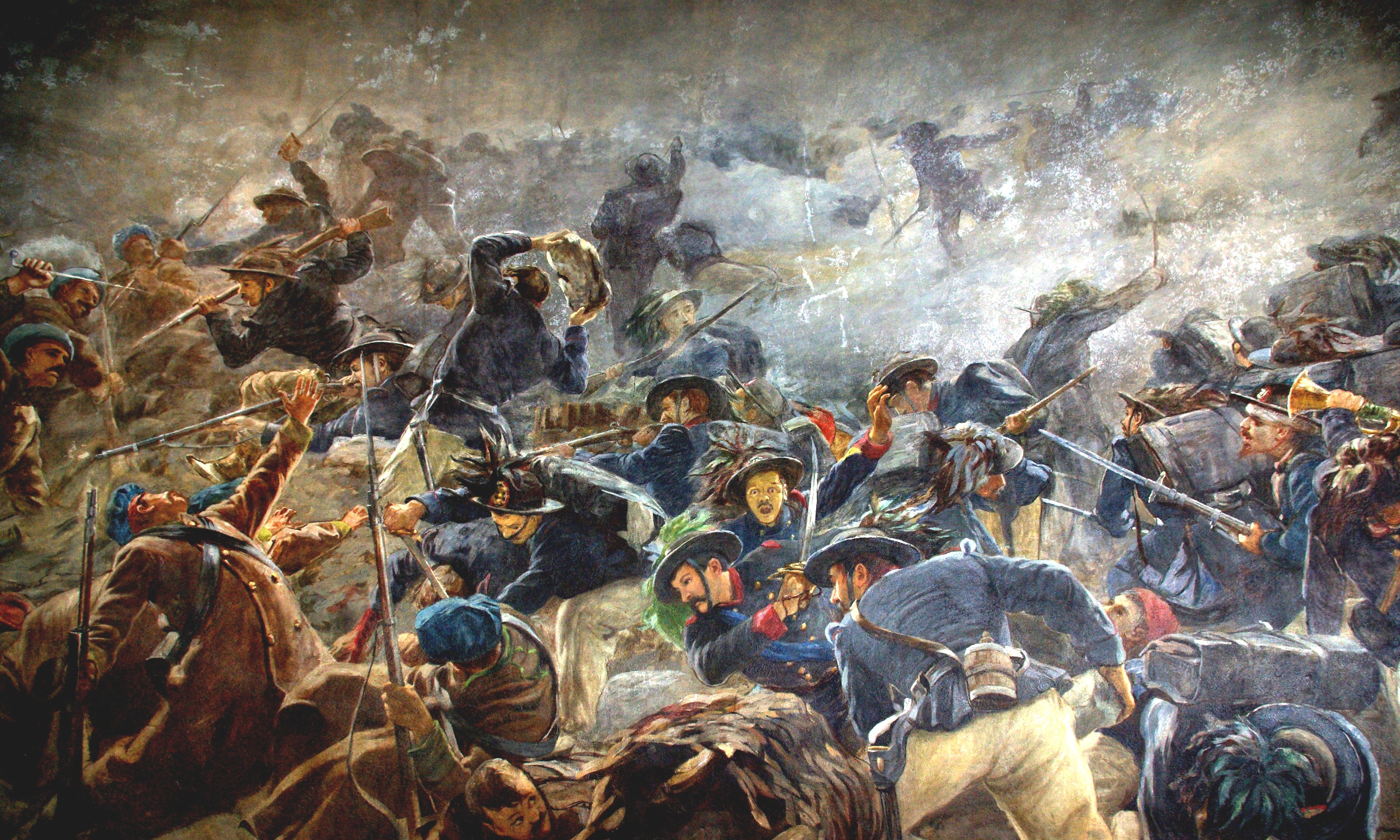
Painting depicting the victory, ferocity and bravery of the soldiers of the Kingdom of Sardinia against the Russian Empire at the Battle of Chernaya in 1855 during the Crimean War.

In June 1815, following the Treaty of Paris of 1815, Victor-Emmanuel I, brother of Charles-Emmanuel IV, returned from exile in Cagliari and recovered Piedmont and Savoy, but had to give the province of Carouge to the canton of Geneva (Treaty of Turin, March 16, 1816). The sovereign enjoyed a favorable a priori from the Savoyards, who remained attached to the House of Savoy.

The policy could be summed up in a few words: all measures in force prior to 1792 were reinstated. Under the Buon governo ("good government") regime, the police were very active, and the powers of the army were increased. The clergy regained a position of strength and re-established a kind of moral order.

The Italian States in 1843, Savoy in the Kingdom of Sardinia

Ascending the throne in 1831, Charles Albert modernized the kingdom and, in 1848, following demonstrations in the kingdom's main cities, granted a statuto or constitution: the Statute of Albertin. Charles Albert embraced the cause of Italian independence and unity. This marked the beginning of the Risorgimento, an important moment in Italian history, but one that hardly concerned the Savoyards. In 1849, Charles Albert abdicated in favor of his son Victor-Emmanuel II. The new king and his Prime Minister Cavour were to be the major architects of Italian unity.

The 1848 census recorded a population of 582,924 in Savoy, compared with 542,258 in 1858, which suggests a high level of emigration between these two dates.

== The 1860s annexation ==
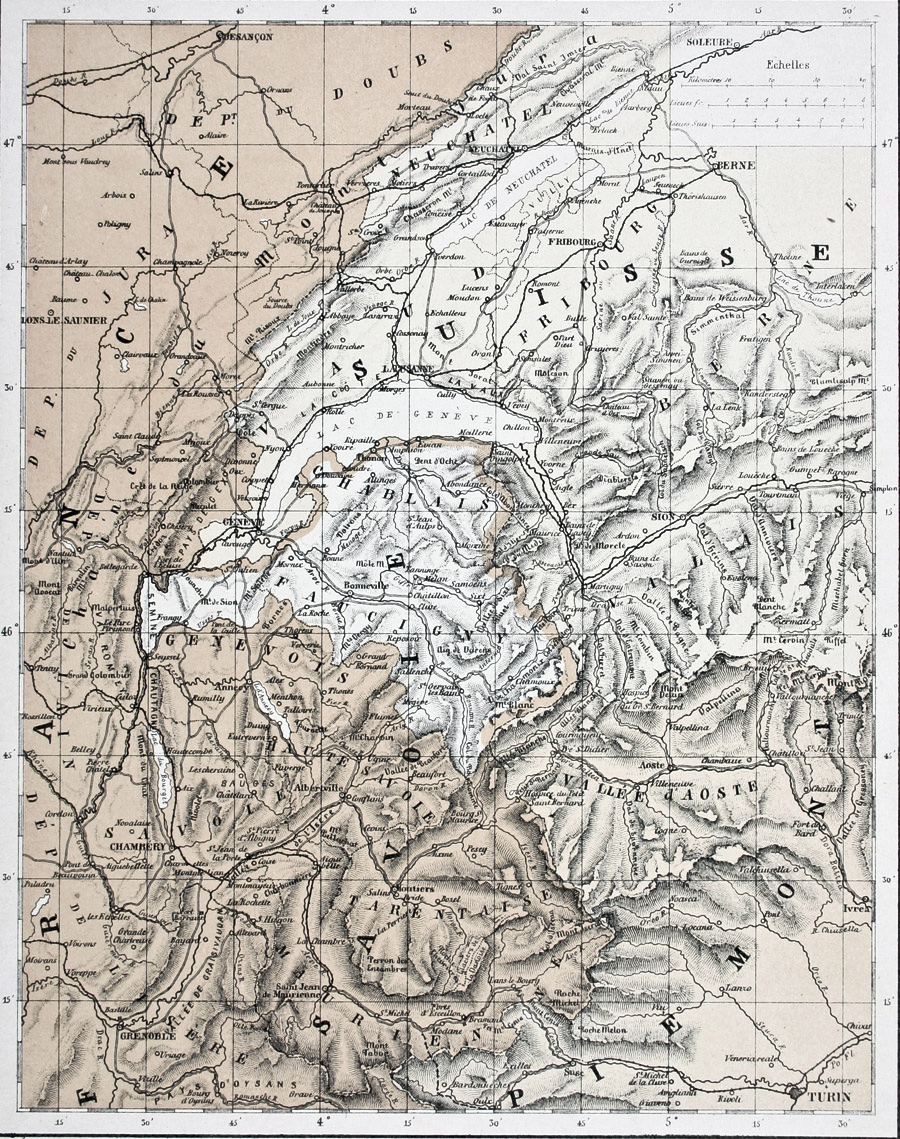
Plan to join Chablais and Faucigny to Switzerland as new cantons / 40 km [=0.035 m]. - Winterthur: J. Wurster, [ca 1860].

"Reattachment" is one of the names given to the annexation of the Duchy of Savoy into to the Second French Empire in 1860, following the Treaty of Turin.

With the Risorgimento, the people of Savoy, especially the elites, developed the idea that their sovereigns were abandoning the cradle of their family by favoring the Piedmont side and Italy. They also pointed to an administrative recruitment policy that discriminated against them because they were French-speaking. On July 21, 1858, Cavour, Minister of the Kingdom of Sardinia, met the French Emperor Napoleon III, who was on a health cure in Plombières (Vosges). During this secret meeting, Napoleon III agreed to help Piedmont-Sardinia unify Italy, on condition that the Pope remained master of Rome and that the county of Nice and Savoy were ceded to France.

The Italian states during the Risorgimento and the annexation of Savoy in 1860.

In April 1859, the Austrian Empire declared war on the Kingdom of Piedmont-Sardinia, which supplied arms to the Lombards. The Sardinians were victorious at Palestro and Montebello, but the French allies prevailed with difficulty at Magenta (June 4) and Solferino (June 24). Worried, Napoleon III signed the Villafranca armistice (July 8). Cavour resigned, and the cession of Savoy and Nice no longer appeared to be on the agenda. Opinion began to stir over a possible French future.

Flag of the Kingdom of Italy (1861–1946) with the colors of the House of Savoy in the center.

There was talk of keeping the province within the Sardinian kingdom, or even of attaching it to Switzerland. (Note: A petition gathered over 13,651 signatures, with 60 communes in the Faucigny region, 23 in the French Chablais and 13 around Saint-Julien-en-Genevois in favor of the Swiss project, supported by England.) Faced with these ideas of partitioning the province, diplomacy began to take shape. On March 24, 1860, the Treaty of Turin was signed, and Savoy was henceforth "attached" to France, subject to certain conditions and the support of the population (a requirement of the Swiss and British chancelleries). On April 1, the king released his Savoyard subjects from their oath of loyalty (royal renunciation). A date was set for the plebiscite, April 22. To avoid tensions in Savoy's northern territories, it was decided to issue a special "YES AND ZONE" bulletin, accompanied by the creation of a large free zone in northern Savoy, in order to win popular support for the question "Does Savoy want to be reunited with France?"

On April 29, the Chambéry Court of Appeal announced the results:

1860 Plebiscite
Territory	Date	Registered	Voters	In favor of reunification	Voting "Yes and Zone	Against reunification	Abstention	Null (including pro-helvetic)	Army
Savoie	22/23 april	135,449	130,839	130,523	47,000	235	around 600	71	6,033 of 6,350
Sources : Henri Ménabréa - Paul Guichonnet.

== Contemporary period ==
=== Land of emigration and immigration ===
==== The second half of the 19th century marked by a demographic decline ====
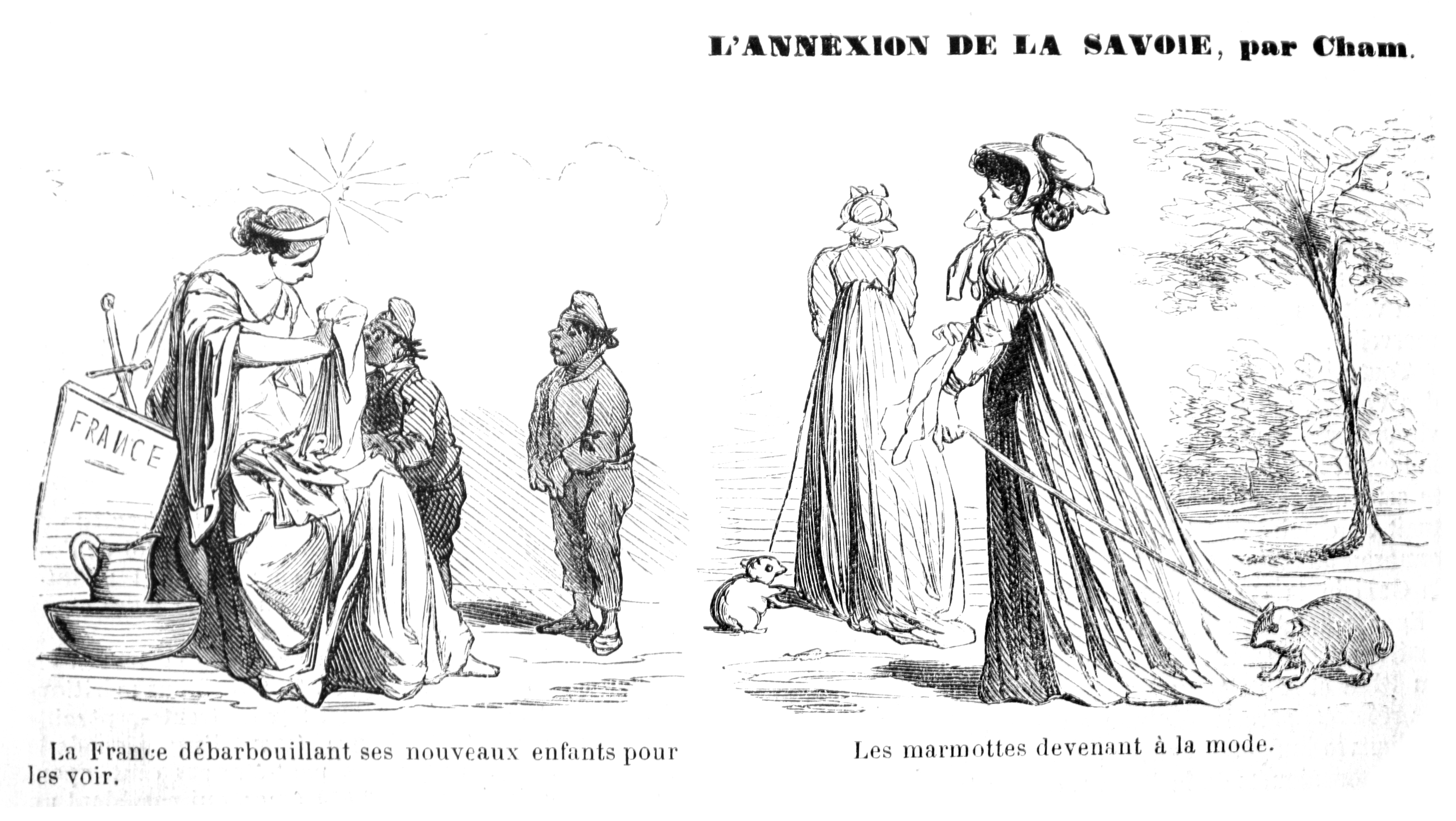
Cartoons by Cham depicting the integration of Savoy into France, published in the Journal universel L'Illustration, June 30, 1860.

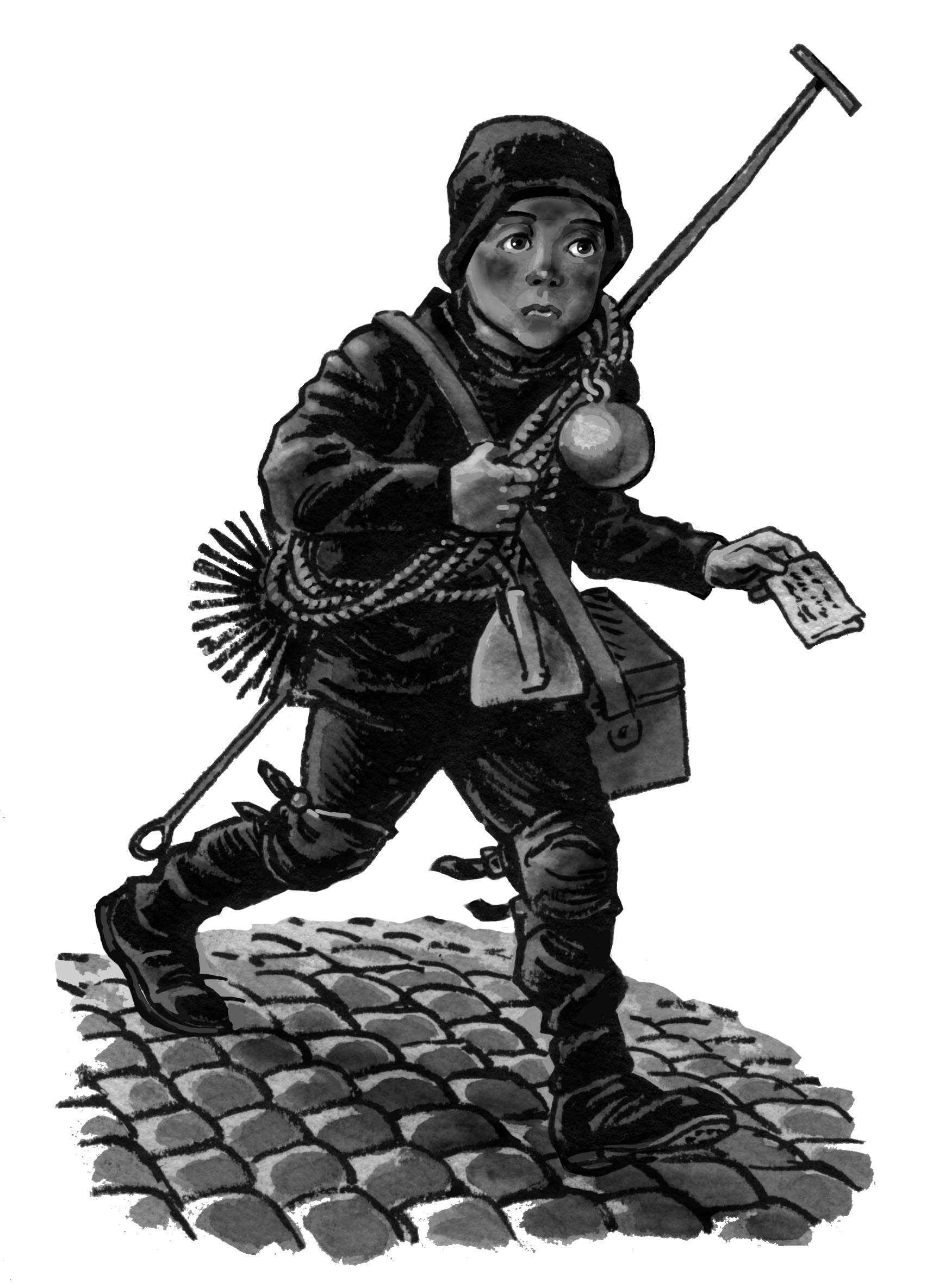

The demographic evolution of the two new departments experienced a crisis due to temporary or even permanent economic immigration, which was further accelerated by the Great War. In half a century, the population of Savoy fell by 9.87% and that of Haute-Savoie by 4.62%. Without taking into account seasonal workers heading for the Lyon or Paris regions, or to the south of France, the gross loss of population for the Savoyard departments was 100,000 inhabitants.

Population: from 1860 to 1926
Year	Savoy	Haute Savoy	Annecy	Chambéry
1860	271 039	267 496	9 370	19 953
1866	271 663	273 768	11 554	18 835
1876	268 361	273 801	10 976	18 545
1896	259 790	265 872	12 894	21 762
1901	254 781	263 803	13 611	22 108
1911	247 890	255 137	15 622	22 958
1921	225 034	235 668	15 004	20 617
1926	231 210	245 317	17 223	23 400

==== Italian emigration to Savoy ====
The first wave of Italian emigration to Savoy dates back to the end of the 19th century, with the arrival of peasants from Friuli, Piedmont and Genoa, leaving poor rural areas to work as laborers or seasonal workers in Savoy. After the First World War, a new wave of migrants driven by poverty and political refugees arrived. There were clashes with the local population (notably due to rising unemployment in the thirties).

During the Second World War, Savoy was part of the Italian occupation zone, making cohabitation with the Italian population a stormy affair. Benito Mussolini called for Savoy and Nice to be reattached to Italy, but this was not to be. New immigrants settled in the 1950s and 1960s, before the arrival of North Africans in the 1950s to work on large hydraulic projects.

In 2008, Savoy had 23,000 Italian nationals (2% of the population), but it is estimated that one in three Savoyards is of Italian origin.

=== The First World War ===
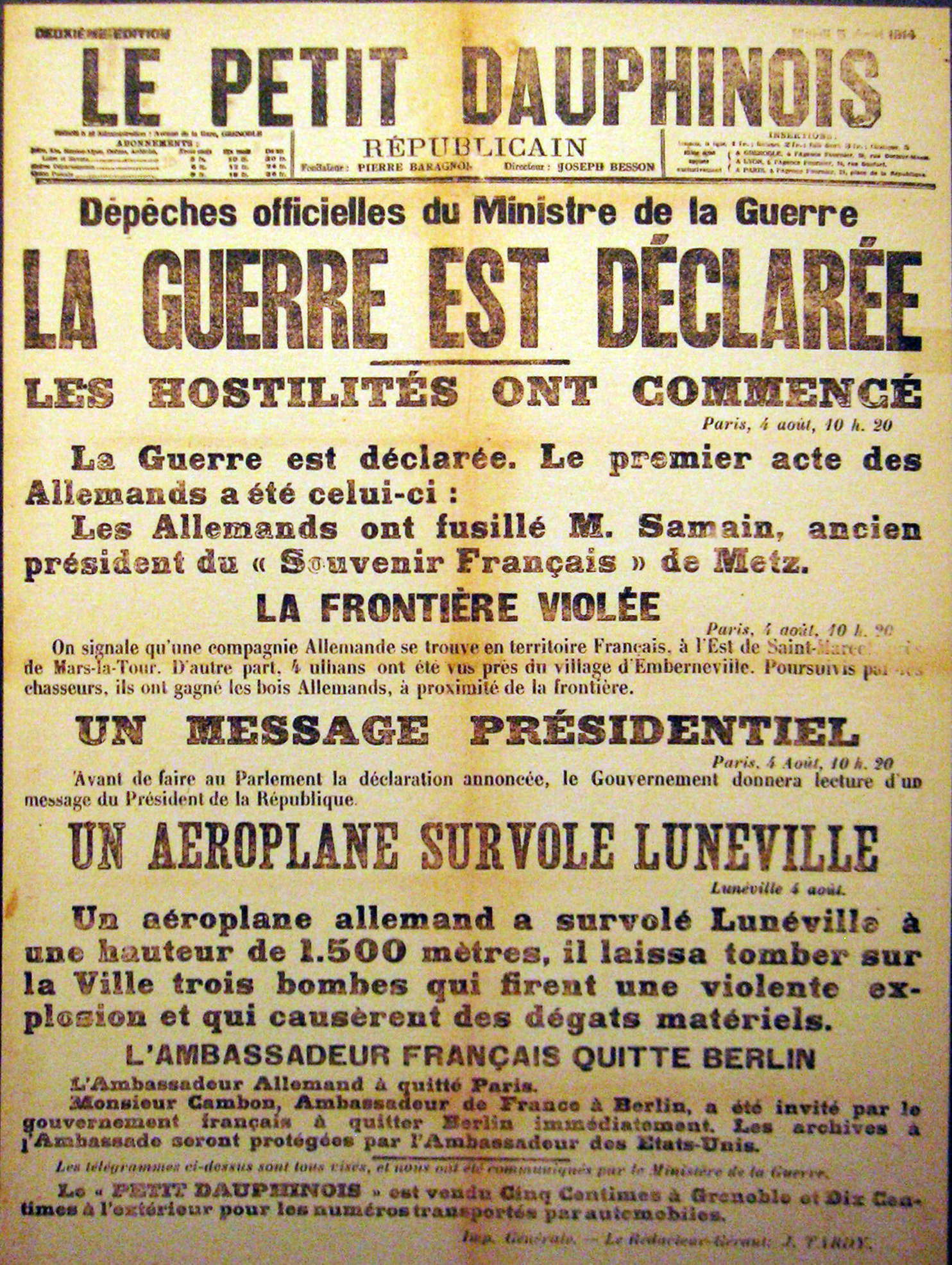
"War is declared", headline in Le Petit Dauphinois, August 4, 1914.

The Savoyard population was hard hit by the First World War, despite the neutrality statutes in northern Savoy acquired in 1815, with around 20,000 deaths for France, a proportion relatively higher than the national average "as in all rural departments", explains historian Christian Sorrel. If we look at the parish lists, we find 9,843 killed in Savoie and 10,400 in Haute-Savoie. According to municipal lists, these figures differ slightly, with 8,881 for Savoy and 9,193 for Haute-Savoie.

During the Great War, the people of Savoy fought in infantry regiments. There were no battalions made up exclusively of Savoyards, but they were found in the 30th Infantry Regiment (based in Annecy, Thonon, Rumilly, and Montmélian), the 97th Alpine Infantry Regiment (based in Chambéry, Bourg-Saint-Maurice, Moûtiers, and Modane), the 230th and 297th, as well as in the Alpine Chasseur Battalions (11th, 13th, 22nd, 51st, 53rd, and 62nd, which formed the 28th Infantry Division). These troops, nicknamed the “Blue Devils,” (Note: This nickname comes from battles that took place in 1915 in the Vosges (Grand Ballon), during which the Alpine troops, dressed in blue and running out of weapons, used rocks to hurl them down onto the enemy. Gaining the upper hand and singing, the surviving Germans referred to them as the “Blauen Teufeln” (“Blue Devils”). Cited in the works of Muller, Claude (2001). Les mystères du Dauphiné [The mysteries of the Dauphiné] (in French). De Borée. pp. 96–101. and Léon, Marie-Hélène (1998). Les chasseurs alpins. Mythe et réalités des Troupes de montagne [Alpine hunters. Myth and reality of the Mountain Troops] (in French). L'Harmattan. pp. 21–22. ISBN 978-2-7384-4737-1.) fought on all fronts (Alsace, Lorraine, Verdun, Chemin des Dames), and on the Alpine front, up to the reversal of alliance with Italy.

The population of Savoy, mostly rural, contributed to the war effort, but harvests were poor. Industry, on the other hand, prospered. The steelworks of Ugine, for example, produced ammunition (shells) and armor plates for tanks.

==== Neutralized zone of Savoy ====
At the Congress of Vienna and in the Treaty of Paris of 1815, it was decided to create a neutral Savoy zone and to establish an international status for Switzerland, guaranteeing its neutrality and the inviolability of its territory. The Savoy zone was initially meant to be placed under Swiss military protection.

The neutralized zone of Savoy extended over the entire department of Haute-Savoie, part of the department of Savoie, and the Pays de Gex, which was then part of Savoy. This neutralized zone was used during the First World War from 1914 to 1918.

==== Human toll and social transformations ====
Savoy did not suffer any invasion. No destruction was recorded. However, the tragic Saint-Michel-de-Maurienne accident, which killed 425 people on December 12, 1917, left a lasting impression.

Losses were significant, with 19,632 deaths according to official sources. (Note: 9,843 killed in Savoie and 10,400 in Haute-Savoie according to Comby 1977, p. 129; as well as Veyret, Paul; Veyret, Germaine (1968). Au cœur de l'Europe, les Alpes [In the heart of Europe, the Alps] (in French). Paris: Flammarion. Other figures: 8,881 for Savoie and 9,193 for Haute-Savoie according to a study by Palluel-Guillard, André (1986). La Savoie de Révolution française à nos jours, XIXe – XXe siècle [Savoy from the French Revolution to the present day, 19th–20th centuries] (in French). Ouest France Université. p. 354. ISBN 2-85882-536-X., repeated by Leguay, Thérèse; Leguay, Jean-Pierre; Cerisier, Emmanuel (2005). Histoire de la Savoie [History of Savoy] (in French). Paris: Editions Jean-paul Gisserot. p. 112. ISBN 978-2-87747-804-5.)

Economically, industry flourished, and the factories in Savoy benefited from the war, thus transforming the region's traditional rural character.

=== Interwar period ===
In 1919, at the end of the war, France chose to denounce the Treaty of Turin through article 435 of the Treaty of Versailles, which abolished the neutralized zone in Savoy and the large free zone that had been established during the Annexation.

Later in 1932, the International Court of Justice in The Hague condemned France and called on it to re-establish the free zone (directly linked to the conditions of annexation), in accordance with the previous treaties of 1815, 1816 and 1829, which had by then lapsed, i.e. 650 km2, as opposed to 4,000 km2 in the 1860 treaty.

==== Cultural context ====
After the First World War, Italian immigration, with its high birth rate, became the main driver of demographic growth in the Savoy region. Nonetheless, Savoy reached its lowest demographic point in 1920, with a population of around 450,000. The face of Savoy gradually changed. Having only become French in 1860, Savoy (more precisely, the departments of Savoie and Haute-Savoie) underwent numerous cultural transformations. One symbolic example is the abandonment of traditional roofing materials such as wooden shingles and flagstones, which were replaced by sheet metal, tiles, or mechanical slate. During the interwar period, Savoy also experienced a true revolution in its economic and tourism sectors, with the rise of winter sports infrastructure and organizations in Megève, Chamonix, and other high-altitude locations. The development of the automobile also promoted green tourism in the summer months.

==== Industrial expansion of hydroelectric power (white coal) ====
The mountain system was called into question with the exploitation of new natural mountain resources: the use of energy produced by waterfalls, or white coal. The invention of the dynamo in 1870 revolutionized the use of white coal. While this energy had already been locally harnessed by populations in sawmills along rivers, this technological innovation enabled the development of a genuine industrial fabric, particularly in the Tarentaise, the Maurienne, the Arly Valley, and the Upper Faucigny. (Note: Examples of sites taken from Palluel-Guillard 1986, p. 257: Tarentaise: Rosière factory in Bozel (Bozel-Malétra Group, 1922); Villard du Planay; Plombière and Château-Feuillet factories (ferrosilicon) in the municipality of La Léchère; Notre-Dame-de-Briançon factory (processing of acetylene derivatives and production of graphite for electrodes, 1932); Maurienne: Factories in Saint-Jean-de-Maurienne, La Saussaz, and La Praz belonging to the AFC company (Alais, Froges et Camargue); Val d’Arly: Factories of the Société d’électrochimie, d’électrométallurgie et des aciéries électriques d’Ugine (SECEMAEU); Haut-Faucigny: Chedde site in Passy (cf. Cheddite).)

Taking advantage of the topography, metal-processing plants (supplied by train) were initially installed near low-flow waterfalls; then, as new technologies emerged, factories were placed near higher-flow rivers. These penstocks (sometimes as long as 12 km) gave rise to electrochemical and electrometallurgical industries. In reality, the establishment of factories in mountainous areas was a consequence of the availability of a low-cost renewable energy source, which compensated for the high cost of transporting raw materials to the sites.

This industrial development disrupted and transformed local societies (leading to the emergence of a new social organization: peasant-workers) and put a stop to the rural exodus that had begun in the 19th century.

The presence of these factories explains why Savoy became a strategic target in 1940.

=== The Second World War ===
At the start of the Second World War, the Alpine front remained relatively unaffected by the conflict. On June 10, 1940, while France was fighting the German invaders, Mussolini declared war. Savoy was occupied by Italy, then by Germany. The communes of Haute Maurienne and those around the Petit-Saint-Bernard pass in Tarentaise were annexed by Italy.

Savoy troops fought mainly in the Maurienne, Tarentaise and Rhône valleys. In 1944, the Savoy Resistance was particularly active on the Plateau des Glières, where Tom Morel set up a maquis, and at the Col des Saisies, for example. The struggle against the German army and the French militia came to a tragic end. The Plateau des Glières became a symbol of the Resistance.

On August 24, Aix-les-Bains was liberated by Resistance fighters, followed by Chambéry the next day. A departmental Liberation Committee, bringing together Resistance movements, was set up, and Lucien Rose became Prefect. However, the German retreat through the Maurienne took a very long time, and was accompanied by numerous acts of violence and the destruction of villages (Hermillon) and bridges. Fighting continued throughout the winter of 1944–1945, particularly at the Roc Noir (Little-Saint-Bernard pass) and Mont-Cenis, between FTP, 13th BCA (Bataillon de Chasseurs Alpins) and German troops, to control the ridge lines. The fighting did not end until the surrender on May 8, 1945.

==== Occupation ====
The armistice of June 24, 1940, was signed at the Villa Incisa near Rome. France and the Kingdom of Italy were represented by Charles Huntziger and Marshal Pietro Badoglio, respectively. Under this agreement, the Upper Maurienne (the canton of Lanslebourg-Mont-Cenis), as well as the communes of Aussois and Avrieux and some communes of Upper Tarentaise such as Séez, were annexed to the Kingdom of Italy, and their administration was transferred to Turin. The inhabitants of these communes were issued Italian identity cards.

The annexation rumor was spread by those who had fled Italy, recalling the fascist deputies' cries in 1938. (Note: On November 30, 1938, during the visit of the Minister of Foreign Affairs, Count Galeazzo Ciano, he was welcomed by Italian fascist deputies in Parliament with cries of “Corsica! Djibouti! Tunisia! Nice! Savoy!” demanding the annexation of these territories.) However, Mussolini had assured Count Galeazzo Ciano that he would not lay claim to the former Duchy of Savoy. In November 1942, all of Savoy was placed under Italian occupation.

Following Italy's capitulation on September 8, 1943, and under German occupation, many villages, especially those in the upper Arc valley, suffered reprisals and destruction by the occupiers aiming to punish resistance movements. The region was the scene of massacres, and villages such as Lanslebourg and Bessans were burned down during the German retreat in 1944. A concentration camp was even built in Modane.

==== Resistance ====
Due to its geographic position and its proximity to Italy and Switzerland, Savoy experienced intense resistance activity, first against Italian, then German occupation. The resistance facilitated the escape of many refugees, particularly Jews, as repression was far less severe in the Italian kingdom. Numerous black market networks were also established. Several maquis (rural resistance groups) emerged, including the Maquis des Glières, operating on the Glières Plateau. With its mid-altitude mountainous terrain allowing for a continuous presence, it fostered the emergence of an organized resistance led by Lieutenant Tom Morel, Companion of the Liberation. The Glières Plateau was chosen in January 1944 for arms drops to supply the local resistance. It was a clear zone, difficult to access by road and thus by the enemy, yet easily spotted by Allied aircraft due to its proximity to Lake Annecy. The "Battle of Glières" (March 1944) resulted in 149 maquisards killed in combat against more than 2,000 Wehrmacht soldiers and Vichy militiamen. Similar tragedies took place in the Chablais, the Bauges, and the Beaufortain, notably at the Col des Saisies.

The Resistance was also present in the Alpine valleys, whose industrial and hydroelectric resources were significant. Steel factories, bridges, high-voltage power lines, and railways in Tarentaise and Maurienne were repeatedly sabotaged by resistance fighters seeking to slow down German war production. A museum of the Resistance was even created in each valley, namely in Moûtiers and Villargondran. While hiking in the mountains, it is common to come across numerous memorials to the resistance fighters executed by the Germans. Haute Maurienne was at the heart of one of the most famous battles of the French Resistance in the Alps. On the heights of the commune of Sollières-Sardières, the Battle of Mont-Froid took place at an altitude of 2,819 meters, between the Alpine troops and German forces during April 1945. These battles, fought under extreme conditions, became one of the symbols of the Resistance in the Alps. Following this battle, the Treaty of Paris rectified what had been considered a geostrategic weakness and a historical error by reintegrating the entire Mont-Cenis plateau, which had until then been on Italian territory since the division of Savoy during its annexation in 1860. Thus, at the end of the war, the map of Haute Maurienne was enlarged by an area of 81.79 km^{2}. De jure, the communes of Sollières-Sardières, Lanslebourg, and Lanslevillard regained full use of their centuries-old alpine pastures, which had until then been located in Italian territory, even though they had always been their property.

=== Economic development in the region ===
==== The quarries ====
In Roman times, limestone was the most prized and abundant material throughout Savoie and, given the formation of the Alps, it was either clearly visible or outcropping under sparse vegetation cover. This makes it much easier to mine. However, from 1969 onwards, awareness of the fragility of the natural environment forced the various state and local players to protect this mountain area, notably with the creation of the Vanoise National Park in 1963 and the Mountain Law (1985).

==== The White Revolutions ====
The mountain system is based on a threefold rationalized spatial organization: the valley bottoms remain strongly linked to human development and activities (housing, traffic, industry, agriculture); the slopes are either abandoned because of the difference in altitude, or are the location of villages/large hamlets based on forestry and mountain agriculture; finally, the mountain is divided into montagnettes (small mountains) frequented by farmers from spring to autumn, alpine pastures where the herds graze, and the high mountains made up of rock and persistent snow associated with glaciers.

This system was challenged by industrial development in the late 19th century (white coal) and tourism (white gold).

===== White coal: the development of heavy industry =====
The mountain system was challenged by the exploitation of new natural mountain resources: the use of energy produced by waterfalls or white coal. The invention of the Dynamo (1870) revolutionized the use of white coal. Although this energy was already being used locally by local populations in sawmills along waterways, this technological innovation enabled the development of a veritable industrial fabric, particularly in the Tarentaise, Maurienne, Val d'Arly and Haut-Faucigny regions. (Note: Examples of sites: *Tarentaise: Rosière in Bozel plant (Bozel-Malétra Group, 1922); Villard du Planay; Plombière and Château-Feuillet plants (iron-sillicon) in the commune of La Léchère; Notre-Dame-de-Briançon plant (processing of acetylene derivatives and production of graphite for electrodes, 1932); *Maurienne: Compagnie AFC (Alais, Froges et Camargue) plants at Saint-Jean-de-Maurienne, La Saussaz and La Praz; *Val d'Arly: Plants of the Société d'électrochimie, d'électrométallurgie et des aciéries électriques d'Ugine (SECEMAEU); *Haut-Faucigny: Chedde site at Passy (cf. Cheddite).)

This industrial development disrupted and transformed local societies (with the emergence of new social organizations such as the peasant-worker movement), and put a stop to the rural exodus that had begun in the 19th century. After the war, the nationalization of electricity (1946), the loss of competition and the emergence of new forms of energy, and above all the lack of space for site expansion, led to a crisis in the 1960s. With great effort, some sites were maintained. Socially, the status of farmer-worker disappeared, and only the worker remained. The consequences on the landscape were visible, with the disappearance of vineyards and the appearance of agricultural wastelands.

Faced with this new crisis in the mountain environment, local authorities began to consider the development of new activities to compensate for this industrial decline.

===== White gold: the development of tourism =====
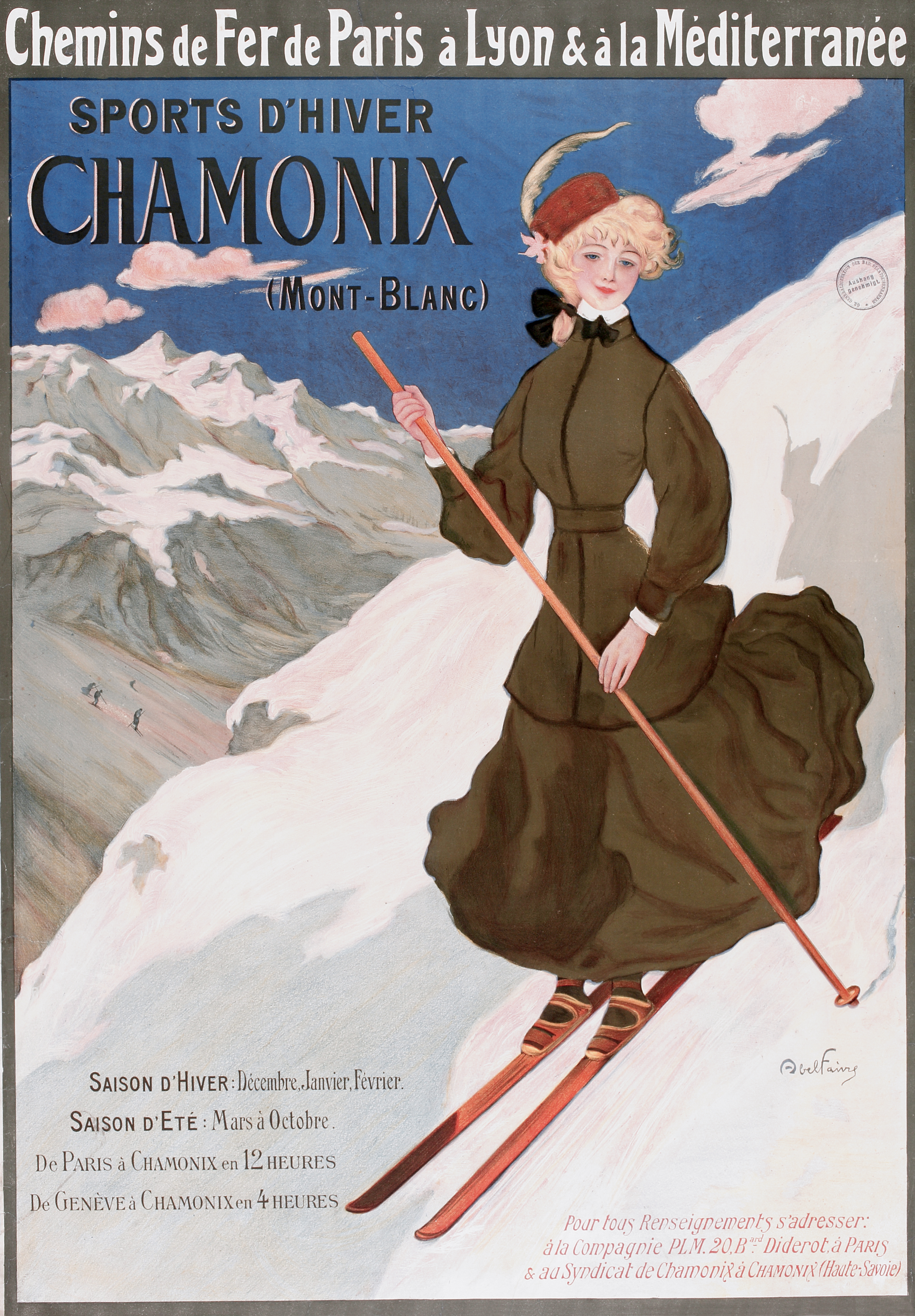
Poster advertising the Compagnie des chemins de fer de Paris à Lyon et à la Méditerranée: "Sports d'hiver. Chamonix (Mont-Blanc)", by Abel Faivre, 1905.

Tourism first appeared in Savoy with the "discovery" of the Alps in the 18th century. Initially limited to the Pre-Alps and thermal baths (as in Aix-les-Bains), tourists ventured into the heart of the Alps.

From the 20th century onwards, the remues and alpine pastures opened up to new practices. The combination of suitable topography, regular snowfall and the determination of a number of players gave Savoy a new dynamism: winter tourism and skiing. The timid development of valley-bottom resorts, such as Chamonix, or medium-altitude resorts, such as Megève or Pralognan-la-Vanoise, was overturned by state and local government intervention in the 1960s. A new type of resort emerged: integrated resorts or "2nd and 3rd generation" resorts, such as Courchevel, Avoriaz and most of the resorts in the Tarentaise valley.

==== Maintaining human activities and preserving the environment ====
Faced with increasing numbers of tourists, the degradation caused by new developments and the saturation of human activities at the bottom of the valleys, the French government decided to protect areas untouched by human activity by decree on July 6, 1963. The Vanoise National Park (PNV) was born (the French equivalent of Italy's Gran Paradiso National Park, created in 1922). It covers the mountain range of the same name, between the upper Arc valley (Maurienne) and the upper Isère valley (Tarentaise), with a surface area of 52,840 ha. This first national park protected flora and fauna by preventing any human intervention in the area, with the exception of temporary habitats (refuges). The decree divides the park into two distinct territories: the high-mountain heartland, the sanctuary par excellence, and the peripheral zone, leaving the communes free to develop as they see fit. However, there is considerable tension between local populations, who wish to develop, developers, who wish to increase skiable areas at high altitude (approx. 3,000 m), and park managers, who guarantee the protection and preservation of natural areas.

Moreover, the "mountain" is a fragile area that needs to be protected, both from an environmental and a human point of view. The Savoy region, most of which lies in the Alps, is therefore seen as a national periphery to be preserved, lest it become an empty zone or one reserved for summer and winter leisure activities. On June 9, 1985, the French law no. 85–30 on the development and protection of the mountains, known as the "mountain law", was promulgated, with Savoyard parliamentarian Louis Besson as rapporteur. This text recognizes the "specific nature of an area, its development and its protection", defining the mountain as "an area where living conditions are more difficult, thus hindering the exercise of certain economic activities, linked among other things to altitude, climatic conditions and steep slopes". Local councillors have thus obtained new support for the development of their commune. At the same time, with a view to "sustainable development", the Rhône-Alpes region set up regional nature parks, from which the Bauges massif benefited in 1995 (Parc naturel régional des Bauges).

=== The resurgence of identity ===
Savoy not only boasts a special identity within the national set-up, becoming the last territory with the county of Nice to be attached to the Hexagon by the Treaty of Turin in 1860, but also one of the oldest European states. The emergence of organized movements claiming their own identity came rather late. Indeed, it was not until a few years after the centenary celebrations of the annexation of Savoy, in the 1960s, that the beginnings of cultural and regionalist movements appeared, such as the Mouvement Région Savoy (1971), followed by the creation of an independence movement, the Ligue savoisienne, in 1994.

The political elites, whether members of parliament or local figures, have never really been interested in this debate. However, the recurrence of the question of a Savoy region since the 1970s has forced them to come up with some answers. In 1983, the two Savoy departmental councils created the Entente régionale de Savoy, a supra-departmental public body responsible for promoting local tourism and heritage, promoting local products (the Savoy brand), managing subsidies for the University of Savoy and supporting cultural associations (including the Orchestre des Pays de Savoy). In 1999, following the emergence and apogee of the Ligue savoisienne movement, the structure attempted to counter this pro-independence breakthrough by evolving the Entente and creating the Assemblée des Pays de Savoy in 2001.

In summer 2014, during the debate on the bill on the delimitation of regions, regional and departmental elections and modifying the electoral calendar, Savoy deputy and General Council president Hervé Gaymard, supported by his Haute-Savoy counterpart Christian Monteil, proposed an amendment that would enable the creation of a Savoy-Mont-Blanc territorial authority. The project was rejected. However, on July 8, 2016, the "Assemblée des Pays de Savoy" became the "Conseil Savoy Mont Blanc", with a new visual identity.

== See also ==
- Counts and dukes of Savoy
- House of Savoy
- Neutralized Zone of Savoy
- Savoy's annexation to France (1792)
- Château des ducs de Savoie
- History of Savoy (1792–1815)
- Treaty of Turin (1860)
- Treaty of Versailles
- Italian invasion of France
- Deanery of Savoy
- Montfalcon family
- List of learned societies of Savoy

== Bibliography ==
- Pittard, Claire (2017). Histoire de la Savoie et de ses États (in French). Fouesnant: Yoran Embanner.
- Leguay, Thérèse; Leguay, Jean-Pierre (2014). La Savoie, des origines à nos jours. Histoire des provinces (in French). Rennes: Éditions Ouest-France.
- Guichonnet, Paul (2007). Nouvelle encyclopédie de la Haute-Savoie: Hier et aujourd'hui (in French). Montmélian: La Fontaine de Siloé. ISBN 978-2-84206-374-0.
- Sorrel, Christian (2006). Histoire de la Savoie en images: images & récits. Les Savoisiennes (in French). Montmélian: La Fontaine de Siloé. ISBN 2-84206-347-3.
- Cerisier, Emmanuel; Leguay, Thérèse; Leguay, Jean-Pierre (2005). Histoire de la Savoie (in French). Paris: Éditions Jean-paul Gisserot. ISBN 978-2-87747-804-5.
- Colonna d'Istria, Robert (2002). Histoire de la Savoie (in French). Paris: Ed. France-Empire. ISBN 2-7048-0943-7.
- Leguay, Jean-Pierre (2000). Histoire de la Savoie (in French). Paris: Éd. Ouest-France. ISBN 2-87747-812-2.
- Béruard, Aristide; Hudry, Marius; Châtel, Juliette; Favre, Alain (1998). Découvrir l'Histoire de la Savoie (in French). Centre de la Culture Savoyarde. ISBN 2-9511379-1-5.
- Genoux, Claude (1997). Histoire de Savoie, depuis la domination romaine jusqu'à nos jours. Fontaine de Siloé.
- Mayeur, Jean-Marie; Sorrel, Christian; Hilaire, Yves-Marie (1996). La Savoie (in French). Paris: Beauchesne. ISBN 978-2-7010-1330-5.
- Guichonnet, Paul (1996). Nouvelle Histoire de la Savoie (in French). Toulouse: éd. Privat. ISBN 2-7089-1637-8.
- de Pingon, Jean (1996). Savoie française, Histoire d'un pays annexé (in French). Yens-sur-Morges (Suisse): éd. Cabédita, Coll. Archives vivantes. ISBN 978-2-88295-184-7.
- Edighoffer, Roland (1992). Histoire de la Savoie. Que sais-je ? (in French). Presses universitaires de France. ISBN 978-2-13-044838-9.
- Clocher, J.R. (1978). Histoire populaire de la Savoie. Trésors de la Savoie. éd. Imprimerie Gaillard.
- Comby, Louis (1977). Histoire des Savoyards. Dossier de l'histoire (in French). Nathan. ISSN 0154-9499.
- Guichonnet, Paul (1988) [1973]. Histoire de la Savoie. Univers de la France et des pays francophones. Série Histoire des provinces (in French). Privat. p. 480.
- Avezou, Robert. Histoire de la Savoie. Que sais-je ?. éd. PUF. ISSN 0768-0066.
- Cahiers d'Histoire (Revue): " La Savoie. Des origines à nos jours " (in French). Lyon: PUF. March 1969.
- Menabrea, Henri (2009) [1933]. Histoire de la Savoie (in French). Montmélian: Éd. Bernard Grasset (1933), puis La Fontaine de Siloé (2009). p. 676. ISBN 978-2-84206-428-0.
- de Saint-Genis, Victor (1868–1869). Histoire de Savoie, d'après les documents originaux, depuis les origines les plus reculées jusqu'à l'Annexion. Vol. 3. Chambéry: Édition Bonne, Conte-Grand.
- Jean Prieur; Aimé Bocquet; Michelle Colardelle; Jean-Pierre Leguay; Jean Loup; Jean Fontanelle (1983). Histoire de la Savoie : La Savoie des origines à l'an mil: Histoire et archéologie (in French). Rennes: Ouest France Université. p. 442. ISBN 2-85882-495-9.
- Demotz, Bernard (2000). Le comté de Savoie du XI^{e} au XV^{e} siècle: Pouvoir, château et État au Moyen ge (in French). Genève: Slatkine. ISBN 2-05-101676-3.
- Réjane Brondy, Bernard Demotz, Jean-Pierre Leguay (1984). Histoire de la Savoie : La Savoie de l'an mil à la Réforme, XIe-début XVI (in French). Ouest France Université. p. 626. ISBN 2-85882-536-X.
- Pierre Duparc. Le comté de Genève, (IX^{e}-XV^{e} siècles). Mémoires et documents (in French). Genève: Société d’histoire et d’archéologie de Genève. p. 621.
- Paul Lullin; Charles Le Fort (1866). Régeste genevois: Répertoire chronologique et analytique des documents imprimés relatifs à l'histoire de la ville et du diocèse de Genève avant l'année 1312 (in French). Société d'histoire et d'archéologie de Genève. p. 542.
- Roger Devos, Bernard Grosperrin (1985). Histoire de la Savoie : La Savoie de la Réforme à la Révolution française (in French). Rennes: Ouest France Université.
- Charles Buet, Les Ducs de Savoie aux XV et XVI siecles. Alfred Mame et Fils. Tours. 1878. General Books (18 janvier 2012) ISBN 978-1235538049.
- Romain Maréchal et Yannick Milleret Atlas historique de Savoie, 1792–1914. ed. Société savoisienne d'histoire et d'archéologie, 2013, 184 p., ISBN 978-2-85092-023-3
- Varaschin, Denis (2009). Aux sources de l'histoire de l'annexion de la Savoie (in French). Peter Lang. p. 625. ISBN 978-90-5201-570-5.
- André Palluel-Guillard (sous la dir.) (1986). Histoire de la Savoie : La Savoie de Révolution française à nos jours, XIX-XX siècle (in French). Ouest France Université. p. 626. ISBN 2-85882-536-X.
- Guichonnet, Paul (1982). Histoire de l'annexion de la Savoie à la France et ses dossiers secrets (in French). Roanne: Éditions Horvath. p. 354. ISBN 978-2-7171-0235-2.
- Jacques Lovie, La vraie vie de tous les jours en Savoie romantique (1815-1860), 1977, 224 pages.
- Michèle Brocard, Lucien Lagier-Bruno, André Palluel-Guillard (1982). Histoire des communes savoyardes: Chambéry et ses environs. Le Petit Bugey (vol. 1) (in French). Roanne: Éditions Horvath. p. 475. ISBN 978-2-7171-0229-1..
- Michèle Brocard, Lucien Lagier-Bruno, André Palluel-Guillard (1984). Histoire des communes savoyardes: Aix-les-Bains et ses environs - Les Bauges - La Chartreuse - La Combe de Savoie - Montmélian (vol. 2) (in French). Roanne: Éditions Horvath. p. 463. ISBN 978-2-7171-0310-6..
- Michèle Brocard, Maurice Messiez-Poche, Pierre Dompnier (1983). Histoire des communes savoyardes: La Maurienne - Chamoux - La Rochette (vol. 3) (in French). Roanne: Éditions Horvath. p. 558. ISBN 978-2-7171-0289-5..
- Marius Hudry (1982). Histoire des communes savoyardes: Albertville et son arrondissement (vol. 4) (in French). Roanne: Éditions Horvath. p. 444. ISBN 978-2-7171-0263-5..
- Henri Baud, Jean-Yves Mariotte, Alain Guerrier (1980). Histoire des communes savoyardes: Le Faucigny (in French). Roanne: Éditions Horvath. p. 619. ISBN 2-7171-0159-4..
- Henri Baud, Jean-Yves Mariotte (1980). Histoire des communes savoyardes: Le Chablais (in French). Éditions Horvath. p. 422. ISBN 978-2-7171-0099-0..
- Henri Baud, Jean-Yves Mariotte, Jean-Bernard Challamel, Alain Guerrier (1981). Histoire des communes savoyardes. Le Genevois et Lac d'Annecy (Tome III) (in French). Roanne: Éditions Horvath. p. 422. ISBN 2-7171-0200-0.
- Collectif (1986). Réalités des Pays de Savoie. éd. Association pour le développement de l'Université de Savoie (ADUS)..
- Jean-Yves Mariotte, A Perret (1979). Atlas historique de la Savoie. Paris..
- Jules-Joseph Vernier (1993) [1896]. Étude historique et géographique sur la Savoie (in French). Paris: Le Livre d'Histoire - Res Universis. p. 137. ISBN 978-2-7428-0039-1.
- Michel Germain (2007). Personnages illustres des Savoie: "de viris illustribus" (in French). Lyon: Autre Vue. p. 619. ISBN 978-2-915688-15-3..
- Pierre Préau (dir.) (2004). Hommes & Femmes. Ils ont fait la Savoie. éd. Questio, coll. "Histoire d'histoires". ISBN 2-913732-16-X..
- Jules Philippe (1863). Les Gloires de la Savoie. J.-B. Clarey. p. 318.
