= Florimontane Academy =

French learned society

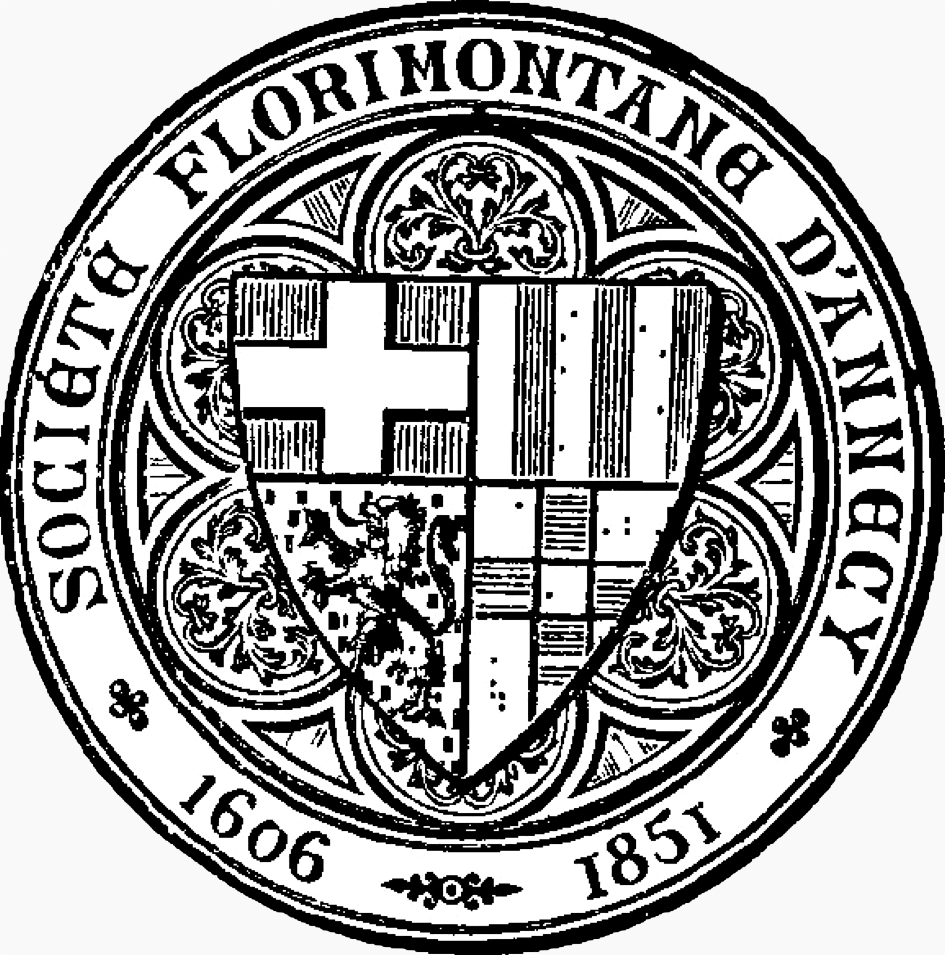
- Seal of the Florimontane Association.
- Founders: Antoine Favre; Francis de Sales
- Types: Learned society
- Purpose: Encourage studies and research that lead to a better understanding of the former States of Savoy.
- Headquarters: Annecy
- Country: France
- Fields: Science, literature, arts
- Official Languages: French
- Chief Executives: Jean-Henri Viallet
- Affiliations: National Conference of Academies of Sciences, Letters, and Arts and Committee for Historical and Scientific Works

The Florimontane Academy, originally established as the Florimontane Society, is a learned society founded in Annecy in 1606–1607. The society ceased to operate in 1610 and was reestablished in 1851.

== History ==
=== Foundation ===
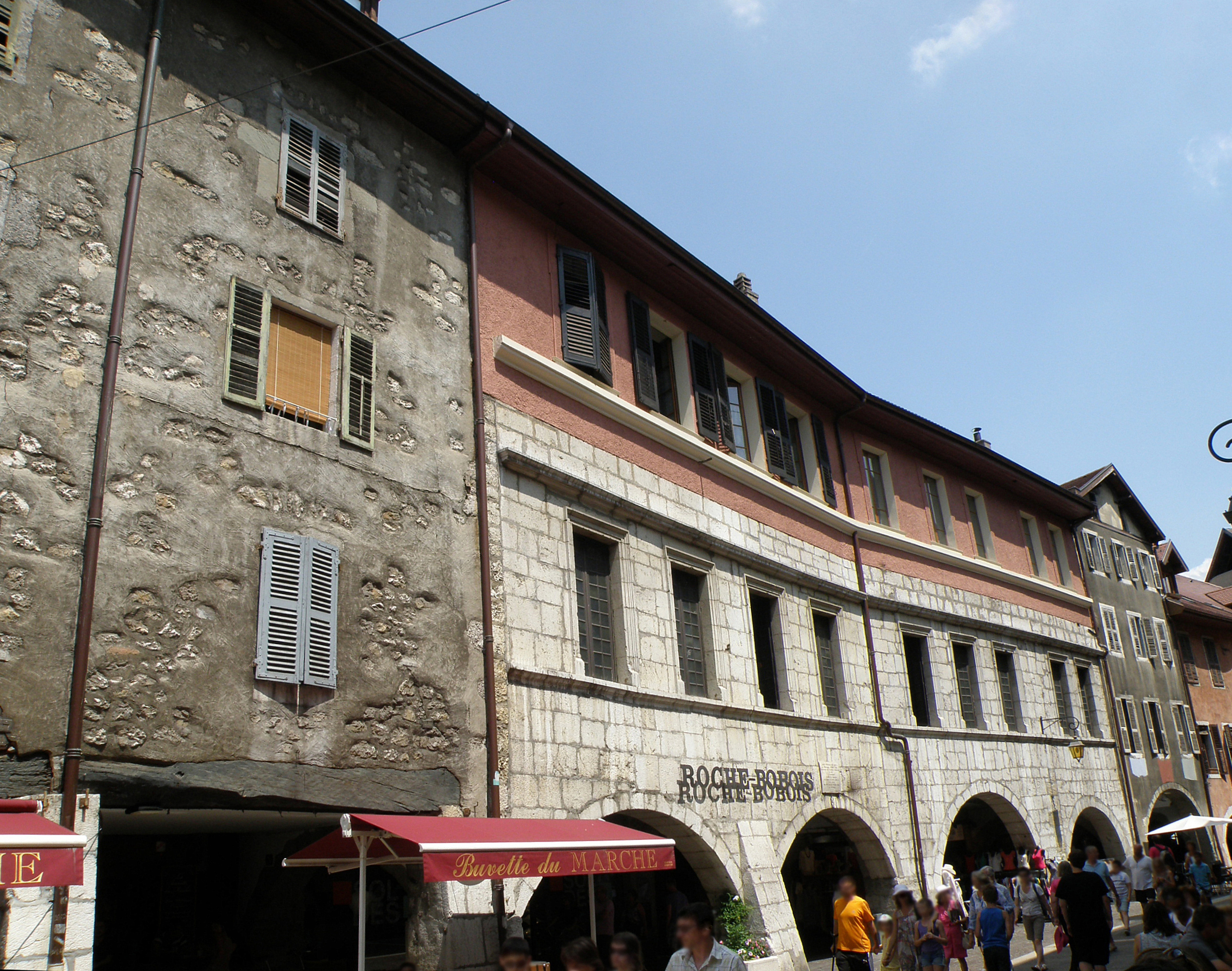
Hôtel Bagnorea (white stone), 18 Rue Sainte-Claire, Annecy.

During the winter of 1606–1607, the Florimontane Academy was established in Annecy, taking inspiration from the Italian academies of the 16th century. The society was founded by two prominent Savoyards: Antoine Favre, Baron of Pérouges and President of the State Council of Genevois, and François de Sales, Prince-Bishop of Geneva. The academy sought to encourage and develop activity across theological, philosophical, scientific, and literary fields. Meetings were held at the Hôtel Bagnoréa on Rue Sainte-Claire in Annecy, the residence of Antoine Favre, which Galeazzo Gegald had constructed.

The first Florimontane Academy benefited from the prominence of its founders and enjoyed considerable prestige. It was one of the earliest French-speaking academies, predating the French Academy by 29 years. (Note: “Thirty years later, Richelieu created the French Academy, which drew on the Italian, Provençal, and Languedoc academies, as attested by the titles of its establishment. Vaugelas may have brought with him the memory of this Annecy prelude, but with the scrupulousness of a grammarian rather than the familiar graces and happy freedoms of this style, the good and fine Gaulish flower, with which his childhood had been nourished. Henri of Savoy, Duke of Nemours and suzerain of the Genevois, accepted the title of Prince of the Florimontane Academy; Charles-Emmanuel approved the statutes on the condition that the selection of members be subject to his control.” (Sainte-Beuve, Hist. de Port-Royal, I.270))

The society comprised 40 members and operated under the patronage of Henri I of Savoy-Nemours, Duke of Geneva.

The name “Florimontane” was selected to reflect the idea that “the muses flourished among the mountains of Savoy.”

In 1610, the Florimontane Academy ceased to function following the departure of Antoine Favre from Annecy to Chambéry to assume the position of President of the Senate of Savoy. François de Sales, occupied with his pastoral duties, was unable to sustain the Academy on his own, and the society subsequently became inactive, remaining absent from the cultural landscape of Savoy until the 19th century.

=== Reactivation ===
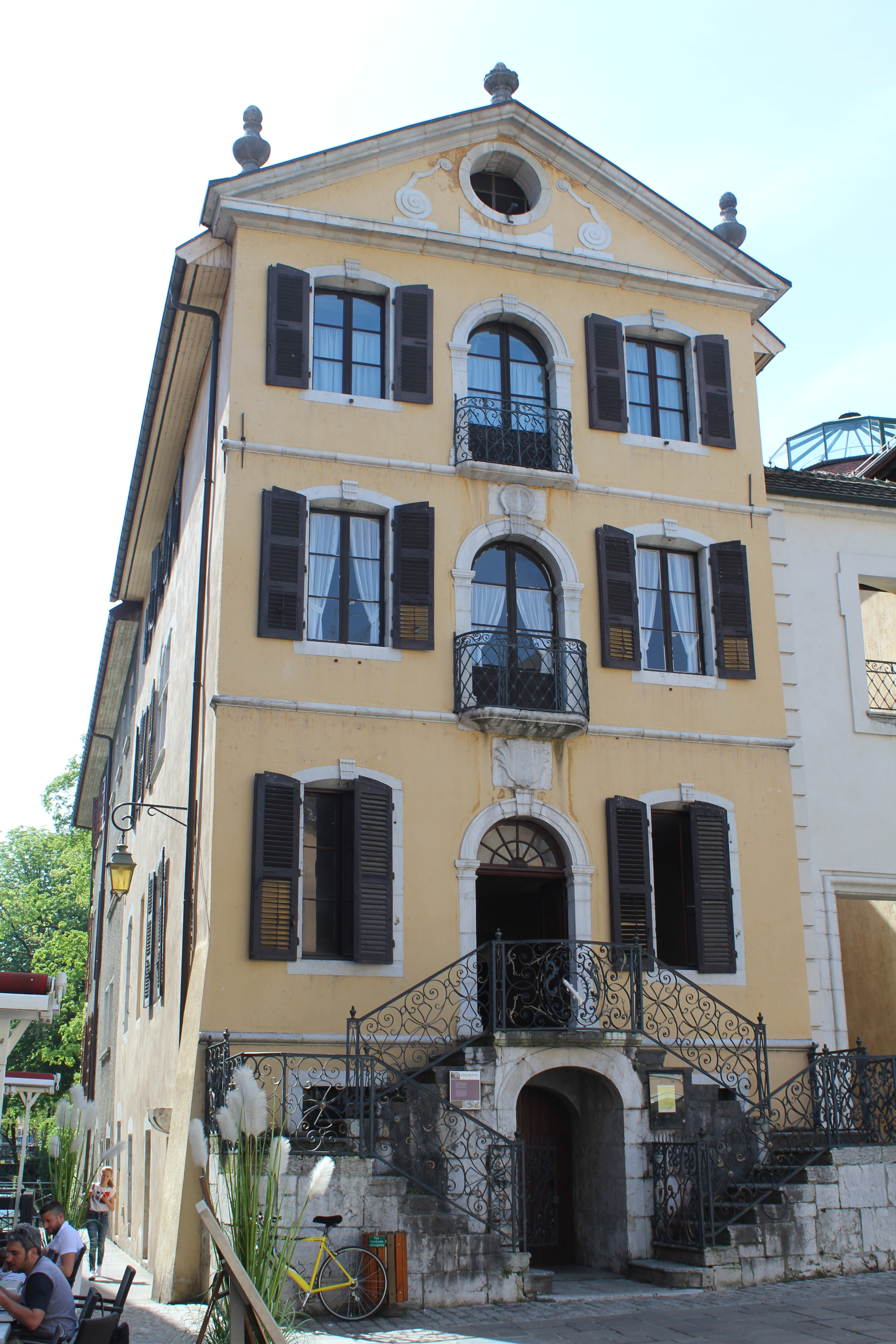
Former Annecy Town Hall, where the Association's first meetings will be held.

In January 1851, a group of Savoyard notables—Jules Philippe (1827–1888), the scholar Éloi Serand (1826–1891), Dr. Louis Bouvier (1819–1908), and Étienne Machard (1824–1887)—established the Florimontane Association, which led to the reactivation of the former academy. Meetings were held in Éloi Serand’s store on Rue Filaterie in Annecy.

The Florimontane Association defined its purpose as conducting research and highlighting all the living resources of the region, making accessible to the public ideas considered just, reasonable, useful, and practical, promoting improvements in the fields of economy, hygiene, and public health, providing courses for the education of the population, and gathering efforts to document and publicize the history of Savoy. The first meeting of the association took place on 7 July 1851. Subsequent meetings were held in Annecy’s old town hall, before being relocated to the new town hall, rooms of the Chamber of Commerce, or the city’s tourist office.

The association adopted statutes in 1893 and was officially recognized as a public utility institution by decree on 17 December 1896.

In 1911, it revised its statutes and was reconstituted as the Florimontane Academy. By 1913, its membership comprised 60 full members, 80 associate members, and 25 corresponding members.

In 1916, following the bequest of Léon Marès (1854–1916), the academy acquired ownership of Montrottier Castle.

It is a member of the National Conference of Academies of Sciences, Letters, and Arts.

As of 2007, the academy had approximately 350 members, with around one-fifth classified as active members.

== Publication ==
The society initially published a bulletin from 1851, which continued for 152 volumes and was renamed the Revue savoisienne in 1859. This monthly journal included content related to the history of the Florimontane Academy and articles on regional history. Most issues are in the public domain and available on Gallica.

Since 1949, the Florimontane Academy has supported research on its history and on Montrottier Castle, including the work of Joseph Serand. This support has continued since 2007 and has also encompassed the research of Julien Coppier on Léon Marès and Montrottier, published in the Revue savoisienne. Bernard Premat has authored a comprehensive volume of the Academy’s memoirs and documents covering its history in the 19th and 20th centuries.

== Motto and emblem ==
Under the patronage of the Duke of Nemours, the Florimontane Academy adopted the orange tree and its fruits as its emblem, with the motto Flores fructusque perennes (“Flowers and fruits all year round”), reflecting François de Sales’ admiration for the tree’s year-round flowering and fruiting. These symbols were later incorporated into the Academy of Sciences, Letters, and Arts of Savoy, founded in 1820.

== Members of the academy ==
=== Members of the first Florimontane Academy ===
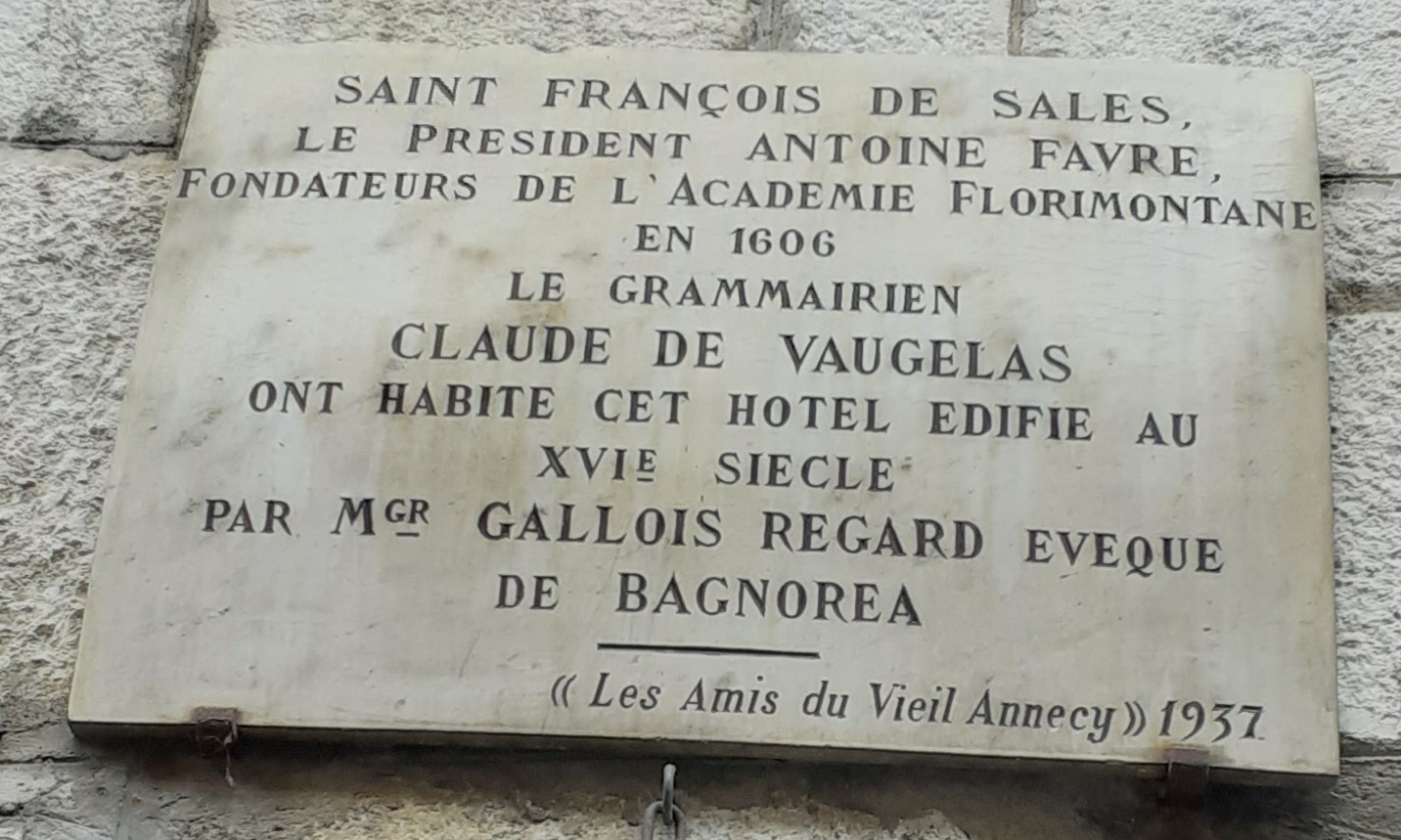
Plaque placed in 1937 on the Academy building

François de Sales (1567–1622) and Antoine Favre (1557–1624) were the founding members of the Florimontane Academy. They were supported by Duke Henri I of Savoy-Nemours (1572–1632), the diplomat Louis de Sales (1577–1654), François de Sales’ brother, Amédée III de Chevron-Villette, the poet and theologian Claude-Étienne Nouvellet (1545–1613), and the lawyer Claude de Quoëx.

Other individuals are reported to have participated in the Academy with varying degrees of certainty. These include Claude-Louis Machet (after 1561–1610); the jurist René Favre de la Valbonne (1583–1656), son of Antoine Favre; the legal scholar Gaspard Schiffordegher (1583–1631); Alphonse I d’Elbène or del Bene (1538–1608), Abbot of Hautecombe; and Pierre Fenouillet (1580–1652), Bishop of Montpellier. Less certain participants mentioned in some sources include Abbé Jean De Age or Déage (d. 1610); Claude Favre de Vaugelas (1585–1650), another son of Antoine Favre; the writer Honoré d’Urfé (1568–1625); the theologian Jean-Pierre Camus (1584–1652); and Pierre Baranzano (1590–1622), professor of physics and Hebrew at the Collège Chappuisien.

=== Members of the second Florimontane Academy ===
In 2014, the Academy had approximately 350 members, including 60 full members, 60 associate members, many corresponding members, and several honorary members.

==== Presidents of the Academy ====
Years	Name	Occupation / Notes	Elected in
2016 —	Jean-Henri Viallet	Deputy Director of the CAF (Family Allowance Fund) of Annecy	
2006— 2016	Bernard Demotz (1937-)	Historian	
1984 — 2006	Paul Guichonnet (1920-2018)	Geographer and historian	
1961 — 1984	Clément Gardet (1910-1997)	Historian, author, editor/printer	Elected in 1942
1955 — 1961	Jean d'Orlyé	Archivist, former mayor of Menthon St-Bernard	Elected on February 7, 1906
1936 — 1955	François-Maurice Ritz	General agent of the Annecy Savings Bank. Mayor of Annecy between 1953 and 1954	Elected in 1922
1931 — 1935	Louis Aussedat (1877-1935)	Industrialist from Annecy. Engineer of Arts and Manufactures, General Director. General Director of the Forces du Fier. President of Papeterie Aussedat from 1928 to 1935. He oversaw the development of Montrottier Castle with the help of Joseph Serand	Elected in 1903
1913 — 1931	François Miquet	Honorary finance collector	Elected in 1885
1911 — 1912	Marius Guerby		
1908 — 1911	Charles Buttin (1856-1931)	Notary	Elected in 1896
1906 — 1908	Charles Marteaux (1861-1956)	University graduate, professor at Lycée Berthollet	Elected in 1891
1862 — 1906	Camille Dunant (1819-1909)		
1854 — 1862	Jacques Replat (1807-1866)		
1851 — 1854	Albert-Eugène Lachenal (1796-1883)	Doctor. Syndic (municipal officer) of Annecy	

==== Notable figures of the Academy ====
- Baron and Doctor Charles-Humbert-Antoine Despine (1777–1852)
- Alphonse-Louis-Joseph Despine (1818–1872), lawyer and professor of law in Annecy, author of several works on regional history and literature, member of the Société des Antiquaires de France
- Camille Dunant (1819–1909)
- Venance Payot (1826–1902), guide, collector, scholar, editor, and naturalist in Chamonix
- Aimé Constantin (1832–1900), scholar, philologist, writer; his work led to the first dictionary of the Savoyard dialect
- Jean-François Gonthier (1847–1913), priest of the Diocese of Annecy and historian of Savoy, honorary president of the Salésian Academy
- Léon Marès (1854–1916), collector
- Louis Balleydier (1856–1927), professor of law, Dean of the Faculty of Law of Grenoble, father-in-law of Louis Aussedat
- Charles Buttin (1856–1933), scholar and collector, author of 140 works for 286 publications, mainly on ancient arms, including the Catalogue de la Collection d'armes anciennes, européennes et orientales (1933)
- Aimé Vaschy (1857–1899), telegraph engineer and mathematician
- René Payot (1894–1970), Swiss journalist
- Georges Chapier (1906–1975), historian of Savoy, member of the Florimontane Academy in 1973, correspondent of the Academy of Philately, and honorary president of the Lyon circle for philatelic and numismatic studies (1974)

== See also ==
- Learned society
- History of Savoy

== Bibliography ==
- Coppier, Julien (2012). "Généreuse Haute-Savoie, histoire des dons et legs 1860-1940 : Léon Marès et son legs du château de Montrottier à l'Académie florimontane" [Generous Haute-Savoie, history of donations and bequests 1860-1940: Léon Marès and his bequest of the Château de Montrottier to the Académie Florimontane]. des Philanthropes œuvrant pour les Beaux-arts et loisirs [Philanthropists working for the fine arts and leisure activities] (in French). pp. 58–61.
- Premat, Bernard (2009). De l’Association florimontane à l’Académie florimontane : histoire d’une renaissance (1951-2007) [From the Florimontane Association to the Florimontane Academy: the story of a renaissance (1951-2007)] (in French). Vol. 5. Annecy: Mémoires et documents publiés par l’Académie florimontane.
- Coppier, Julien (2009). "Le domaine de Montrottier (Lovagny–Haute-Savoie), de la demeure du collectionneur Léon Marès à la propriété de l'Académie florimontane (1916-1919)" [The Montrottier estate (Lovagny–Haute-Savoie), from the home of collector Léon Marès to the property of the Florimontane Academy (1916–1919)]. Revue savoisienne (in French): 97–130.
- Coppier, Julien (2007). Le château de Montrottier : la demeure d’un collectionneur (Lovagny–Haute-Savoie) [Montrottier Castle: the home of a collector (Lovagny–Haute-Savoie)] (in French). Saint-Amand-Montrond: Édition Gaud.
- Coppier, Julien (2007a). La Florimontane et ses académiciens : 400 ans au service de la connaissance [The Florimontane and its academicians: 400 years in the service of knowledge] (in French).
- Serand, J (1949). Le château de Montrottier, étude historique et archéologique [The Château de Montrottier, historical and archaeological study] (in French).

=== Exhibition ===
- "La Florimontane et ses académiciens : 400 ans au service de la connaissance" [The Florimontane and its academicians: 400 years in the service of knowledge]. Archives du Jura (in French).
