= Léman (department) =

Former French department (1798–1814)

Department of Léman Département du Léman (French)
- 1798–1814
- Location of Léman in France (1812)
- Status: Department of the French First Republic and the French First Empire
- Chef-lieu: Geneva; 46.2°N 6.15°E
- Official languages: French
- History
  - Annexation of the Republic of Geneva: 23 April 1798
  - Established: 25 August 1798
  - Restoration of the Republic of Geneva: 31 December 1813
  - Disestablished: 1814

Area
- 1804: 2,800 km^{2} (1,100 sq mi)

Population
  - 1804: 215,884
  - 1812: 210,478
Preceded by	Succeeded by
Republic of Geneva	Restoration and Regeneration in Switzerland
- Today part of: Switzerland; France

Léman (French: [lemɑ̃]) was a department of the French First Republic and French First Empire. Its name came from the French name of Lake Geneva, Lac Léman. It was formed in 1798, when the Republic of Geneva was annexed by the French Republic. Léman also included districts that were previously part of the departments of Mont-Blanc (northern Savoy) and Ain (the Pays de Gex). Its territory corresponded with the present Swiss canton of Geneva and parts of the present French departments of Ain and Haute-Savoie.

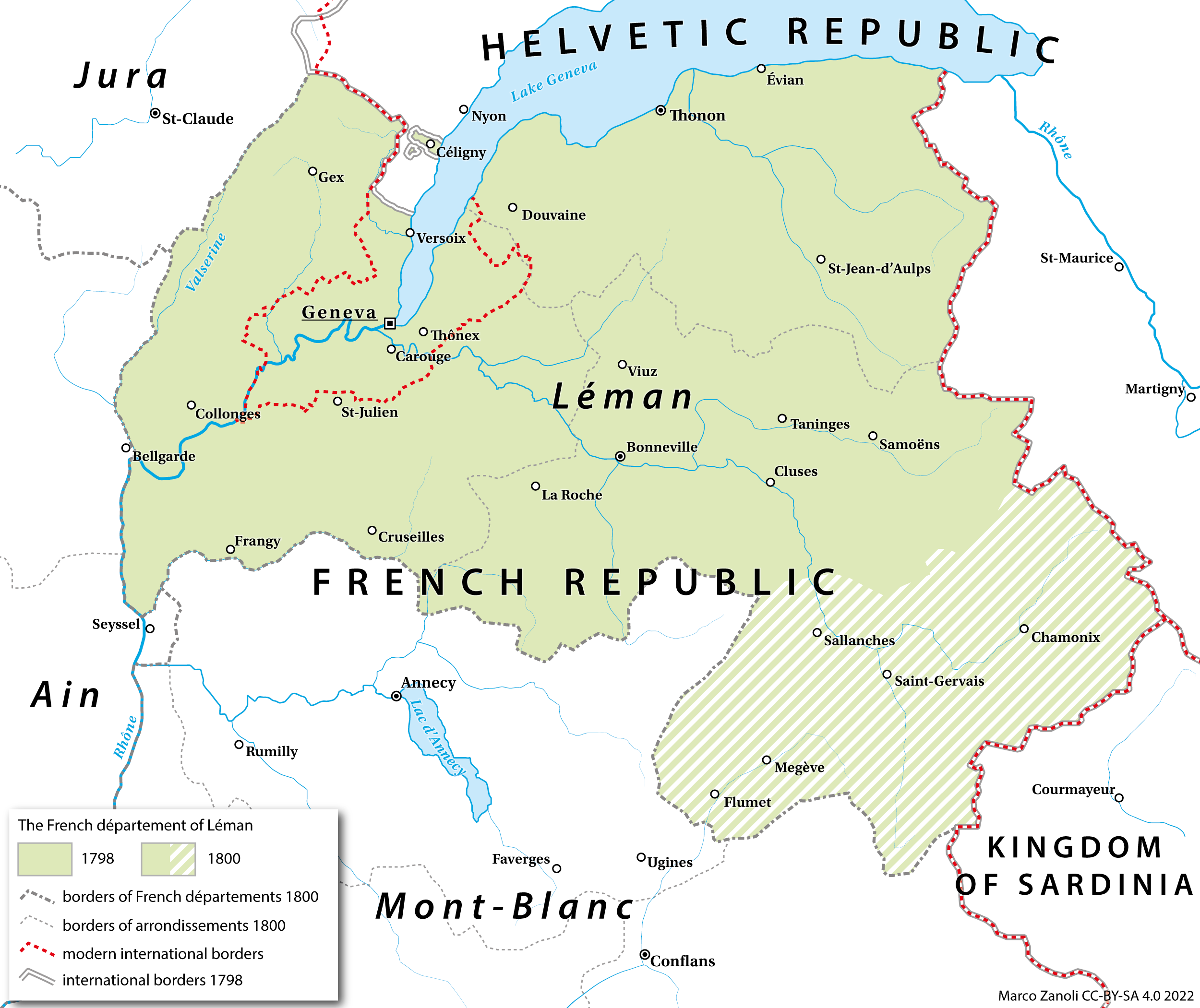
Map of the department of Léman

The Chef-lieu of the department was Geneva. The department was subdivided into the following three arrondissements and cantons:

Coat of arms of the city of Geneva under the French Empire

- Genève: Carouge, Chêne-Thônex, Collonge, Frangy, Genève (3 cantons), Gex, Reignier and Saint-Julien.
- Bonneville: Bonneville, Chamonix, Cluses, Megève, La Roche, Sallanches, Samoëns, Taninges and Viuz-en-Sallaz.
- Thonon: Douvaine, Évian, Saint-Jean-d'Aulps and Thonon.

After the final defeat of Napoleon in 1815, the former Republic of Geneva became a Swiss canton, and Savoy was returned to the Kingdom of Sardinia. The Pays de Gex returned to the department of Ain except for six communes (Pregny, Collex-Bossy, Grand-Saconnex, Vernier, Meyrin and Versoix), which were ceded to the Canton of Geneva.

== Administration ==
=== Prefects ===
The Prefect was the highest state representative in the department.

Term start	Term end	Office holder
2 March 1800	10 December 1802	Ange Marie d'Eymar
10 December 1802	30 November 1810	Claude Ignace Brugière de Barante
30 November 1810	5 January 1814	Guillaume Antoine Benoît Capelle
5 January 1814	Not installed	Louis Toussaint de La Moussaye

=== Secretary-General ===
The Secretary-General was the deputy to the Prefect.

Term start	Term end	Office holder
2 March 1800	?? ?? 1802	Cornuaud
?? ?? 1803	?? ?? 1811	Étienne Charles Garnier
?? ?? 1811	31 December 1813	J.J. Councler

=== Subprefects of Bonneville ===
Term start	Term end	Office holder
1 August 1800	12 June 1811	Joseph Marie Gavard
12 June 1811	31 December 1813	Gavard Fils
26 December 1811	31 December 1813	Jean-Baptiste Rogniat

=== Subprefects of Genève ===
The office of Subprefect of Genève was held by the Prefect until 1811.

Term start	Term end	Office holder
14 January 1811	7 May 1812	Bouthillier de Beaumont
7 May 1812	31 December 1813	Jean Baptiste Bourgeois de Jessaint

=== Subprefects of Thonon ===
Term start	Term end	Office holder
5 April 1800	1 October 1804	François Plagnat
1 October 1804	31 December 1813	Joseph Jérôme Milliet

== See also ==
- Former departments of France
- Canton of Léman
- Plainpalais
