= National Assembly of the Allobroges =

First legislative assembly of Savoy

Assemblée nationale des Allobroges Assemblée des députés des communes de la Savoye

Type
- Type: Unicameral

History
- Established: 22 September 1792
- Disbanded: 29 October 1792
- Preceded by: None
- Succeeded by: None

Meeting place
- Savoy

The National Assembly of the Allobroges (French: Assemblée nationale des Allobroges), also known as the Assembly of the Deputies of the Communes of Savoy, was the first legislative assembly of Savoy, established in 1792 following its annexation by France and incorporation as the Mont-Blanc department.

== Formation ==
On 22 September 1792, French revolutionary troops, renamed the Légion des Allobroges for the occasion, invaded Savoy and proclaimed a republic. The Savoyard portion of the Kingdom of Sardinia was annexed to France as the Mont-Blanc department by the law of 27 November 1792.

Prior to the French Revolution, republican clubs existed in Savoy but were banned by the monarchy under Victor Amadeus III. These clubs served as the foundation for the formation of the first Savoyard assembly. On 6 October, the communes of Savoy voted overwhelmingly to join France and elected representatives to the Assemblée des Allobroges.

== Key decisions ==
The primary decisions of the Assemblée des Allobroges focused on abolishing symbols of the Ancien Régime and formalizing the annexation to France. Each province in the cisalpine portion of the former kingdom sent deputies based on the number of communes, and a survey was conducted to gauge support for annexation. In the Carouge province, 42 of 64 communes supported union with France. All 65 communes in Chablais, 79 in Faucigny, and 116 in Genevois unanimously supported annexation. In Maurienne, 62 of 65 communes were in favor, and in Savoy proper, 203 of 204 communes supported the union. In Tarentaise, only 13 of 62 communes explicitly favored annexation, with the remainder deferring to the assembly’s decision. The annexation to France was swiftly approved on 22 October.

During sessions on 26 and 27 October, the assembly abolished the sovereign rights of the House of Savoy, nobility, feudal dues, tithes, and confiscated clergy property.

The assembly was dissolved on 29 October after expressing its desire for annexation to France. This resolution was conveyed to the National Constituent Assembly in Paris by Abbé Grégoire.

== See also ==
- Mont-Blanc (department)
- Légion des Allobroges
- French Revolution
- House of Savoy
- Victor Amadeus III of Sardinia
- Henri Grégoire

== Bibliography ==
- Directeurs de l'Imprimerie du Cercle social (1792). L'assemblée des Allobroges à la Convention Nationale de France [The Allobroges assembly at the French National Convention] (in French). Imprimerie nationale. p. 91.
- Régis Carron, François (1906). Procès-verbaux de l'Assemblée nationale des Allobroges [Minutes of the National Assembly of the Allobroges] (in French). Bonvalot-Jouve. p. 203.
