= André Palluel-Guillard =

French academic and historian (1940–2023)

President of the Société savoisienne d'histoire et d'archéologie
- In office 1983–2001
- Preceded by: Jacques Lovie
- Succeeded by: Maurice Messiez-Poche

Personal details
- Born: 20 November 1940 Chambéry, France
- Died: 18 October 2023 (aged 82)
- Education: Université Savoie Mont Blanc
- Occupation: Professor; Historian

André Palluel-Guillard (20 November 1940 – 18 October 2023) was a French academic and historian who specialized in Napoleonic studies and Savoy.

== Biography ==
Born in Chambéry on 20 November 1940, Palluel-Guillard taught at secondary schools in his hometown and Grenoble and was an attaché for the French National Centre for Scientific Research. He also wrote for the Revue Napoléon. He was elected to the Académie des sciences, belles-lettres et arts de Savoie. He defended his doctoral thesis, titled L'Aigle et La Croix, in 1991 at the Université Savoie Mont Blanc. This allowed him to work at the National Archives and the Bibliothèque de Genève. During his studies at the Archivio di Stato di Torino, he became interested in the history of Savoy during the First French Empire and the Bourbon Restoration.

During the rise of the Savoyan League, Palluel-Guillard, along with fellow Savoy historian Paul Guichonnet spoke out against Savoyan independence and defended the 1860 Annexation of Savoy to France. The Savoyan League took him to court, but he was supported by a petition signed by more than 1700 students and teachers. At the Departmental archives of Savoie, the Fonds Palluel-Guillard constitutes 70 notebooks from various students in the Savoy history department. In 2002, a compilation of his works, titled Frontières, contacts, échanges : mélanges offerts à André Palluel-Guillard, was published by Christian Sorrel. Having served as president of the Société savoisienne d'histoire et d'archéologie from 1983 to 2001, he was named honorary president after his retirement.

André Palluel-Guillard died on 18 October 2023, at the age of 82.

== Distinctions ==
- Prix Premier-Empire (2000)
- Knight of the Legion of Honour

== Publications ==
- Histoire des communes de Savoie (1964)
- Dictionnaire Napoléon (1969)
- L'épisode napoléonien : aspects extérieurs (1799-1815) (1972)
- Histoire de Savoie : de la Révolution à nos jours (1986)
- L'Aigle et la croix : Genève et la Savoie, 1798-1815 (1991)
- Histoire et dictionnaire du Consulat et de l'Empire (1995)
- Fromages de Savoie : le passé, le présent (1995)
- Chambéry à la Belle Époque (2003)
- La maison de Savoie : une ambition millénaire (2011)
