= State Archives of Turin =

State archival institution in Turin, Italy

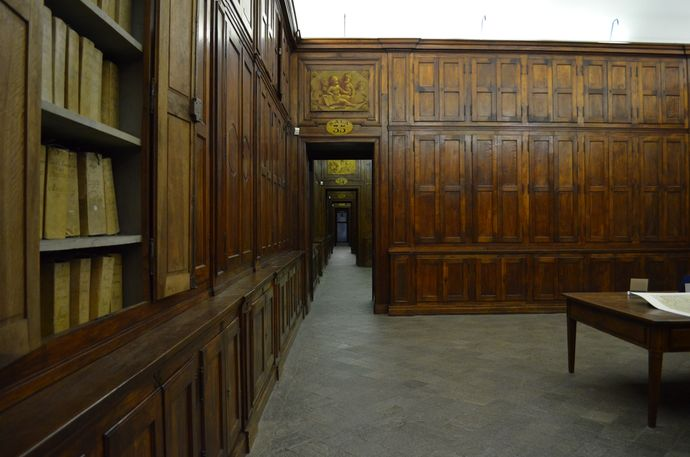
- Interactive map of State Archives of Turin
- 45°04′15″N 7°41′14″E
- Location: Turin, Piedmont, Italy
- Type: State archive
- Website: http://archiviodistatotorino.beniculturali.it

The State Archives of Turin (Italian: Archivio di Stato di Torino) is a public archival institution located in Turin, Italy. It preserves historical records relating to the governmental and administrative institutions that operated in Piedmont and in the territories ruled by the House of Savoy.

The archive originated in the early eighteenth century when the Savoyard administration began organizing the state records of the Duchy of Savoy and the Kingdom of Sardinia. It was formally established in 1731 by Charles Emmanuel III of Savoy as a central repository for the archives of the Savoyard state.

== Sources ==
- L'Archivio di Stato di Torino. Fiesole: Nardini. 1994.
- "Archivio di Stato di Torino". Sistema archivistico nazionale (in Italian). Istituto centrale per gli archivi.
