= Antoine Favre (jurist) =

Savoisian nobleman and jurist (1557–1624)

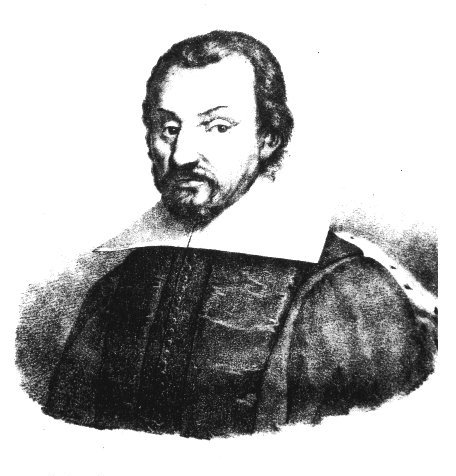
Antoine Favre

Antoine Favre, baron of Pérouges (5 October 1557 – 1624) was a nobleman and jurist from Savoy.

Favre was born in Bourg-en-Bresse. After studies in Paris and Turin, he practiced law in Chambéry. He was a member of the Savoyard court there from 1585 onwards, and its president from 1610 onwards.

His principal scholarly work is the Codex Fabrianus definitionum forensium (1609), a report of the decisions of his court organised after the Justinian Code. Favre's other research, conjectures about the Justinian code in which he endeavours to separate the Justinian insertions from the classical Roman texts, is still valued by scholars today.

He was the father of Claude Favre de Vaugelas.
