= Mont-Blanc (department) =

Administrative division of the First French Empire

Coordinates: 45°35′N 6°15′E

Location of Mont-Blanc in France (1812)

Mont-Blanc (French pronunciation: [mɔ̃ blɑ̃]) was a department of the First French Empire. It was named after Mont Blanc, the highest mountain in Western Europe, which marks the border between France and Piedmont. It was formed in 1792, when the Savoy region (part of the Kingdom of Sardinia) was occupied by the French. The department ceased to exist following Napoleon's defeat at Waterloo; the territory was restored to its former rulers. Its prefecture was Chambéry.

Map of the department of Mont-Blanc (1800)

On 17 February 1800, five cantons (Chamonix, Saint-Gervais, Megève, Flumet and Sallanches) including the Mont Blanc were transferred to the neighbouring Léman department. This meant that although the Mont-Blanc department kept its name, its namesake fell outside its territory. A similar situation exists nowadays with the Var department in Southern France.

== Chronology ==
During the night of 21 September 1792, French troops under General Moutesquiou launched a surprise attack on the Duchy of Savoy, which at the time was a dependent territory of the Kingdom of Sardinia. The king, who was in residence at Chambéry, accompanied by his army, numerous administrators and clergy, fled across the Alps to his Piedmontese lands.

At the end of October, the so-called Assembly of the Allobroges (who named themselves after an ancient people thought to have occupied the region two thousand years earlier) convened in the cathedral at Chambéry. Their agenda followed the revolutionary script that by now was becoming familiar across France, as they declared an end to despotism, forced labour and the hated salt tax. The meeting was dissolved on 29 October 1792, but not before passing a resolution expressing the wish for the Duchy of Savoy to be incorporated into revolutionary France. Two deputies, named François Amédée Doppet and Simond, were mandated to convey this wish to the revolutionary National Convention in Paris.

The next month, on 27 November 1792, the Savoyards became, for the next 23 years, French citizens, by means of the Decree covering the joining of Savoy to France. This document also created the department of Mont-Blanc.

In 1798, after the French took Geneva, the northern part of the department of Mont-Blanc was transferred to the new department of Léman. After the first defeat of Napoleon Bonaparte in 1814, France lost Geneva. The formerly French department of Léman disappeared; the department of Mont-Blanc seems to have been restored with approximately the borders established in 1792.

Although the department remained French territory under the terms of the 1814 Treaty of Paris, harsher terms were imposed on France after Napoleon's escape from his Elban exile; indeed, under the 1815 Treaty of Paris the territory covered by the department of Mont-Blanc was returned to its former rulers, integrated back into the Kingdom of Sardinia.

A little less than half a century later, under the terms of the Treaty of Turin, Savoy was reintegrated into France as part of a deal between the leaders of the French government and the Piedmontese government, this being the price of French support for the unification of Italy under Piedmontese leadership. However, the department of Mont-Blanc was not reinstated. Instead, the territory that it had formerly covered was divided between the newly created departments of Savoie and Haute-Savoie (partly).

== Administration ==
The capital of the department of Mont-Blanc was Chambéry. The department was subdivided into the following arrondissements and cantons (situation in 1812):

- Chambéry, cantons: Aix, La Biolle, Chambéry (2 cantons), Le Châtelard, Les Échelles, L'Hôpital, Montmélian, Novalaise, Le Pont-de-Beauvoisin, La Rochette, Ruffieux, Saint-Genix, Saint-Pierre-d'Albigny and Yenne.
- Annecy, cantons: Annecy (2 cantons), Faverges, Rumilly and Thônes.
- Moûtiers, cantons: Beaufort, Bourg-Saint-Maurice, Conflans and Moûtiers (2 cantons).
- Saint-Jean-de-Maurienne, cantons: Aiguebelle, La Chambre, Lanslebourg, Modane, Saint-Étienne-de-Cuines, Saint-Jean-de-Maurienne (2 cantons) and Saint-Michel.

Its population in 1812 was 300,239, and its area was 640,427 hectares.

== See also ==
- 130 departments of the First French Empire
- Former departments of France
