= List of Canadian plants by genus C =

This is a partial list of the plant species considered native to Canada.

Many of the plants seen in Canada were introduced, either intentionally or accidentally. For these plants, see List of plants introduced to Canada.

N indicates native and X indicates exotic. Those plants whose status is unknown are marked with a ?.

Due to Canada's biodiversity, this page is divided.

== Ca ==
- Cakile — searockets
  - Cakile edentula — American searocket
- Calamagrostis — reedgrasses
  - Calamagrostis canadensis — Canada bluejoint, Canada reedgrass, Langsdorff's reedgrass, Macoun's reedgrass
  - Calamagrostis deschampsioides — circumpolar reedgrass
  - Calamagrostis lapponica — Lapland reedgrass
  - Calamagrostis purpurascens — purple reedgrass
  - Calamagrostis stricta subsp. inexpansa — bog reedgrass, northern reedgrass
- Calamintha — calamints
  - Calamintha arkansana — low calamint, savoury, wild calamint, limestone wild basil
- Calamovilfa — sandreeds
  - Calamovilfa longifolia var. magna — prairie sandreed
- Calla — callas
  - Calla palustris — wild calla, water arum
- Callitriche — water-starworts
  - Callitriche hermaphroditica — narrowleaf water-starwort, northern water-starwort, autumnal water-starwort
  - Callitriche heterophylla — larger water-starwort
  - Callitriche palustris — vernal water-starwort
- Callitropsis —
  - Callitropsis nootkatensis — Alaska yellow cedar, Nootka false-cypress, yellow cedar
- Calopogon — grass-pinks
  - Calopogon tuberosus — tuberous grass-pink
- Caltha — marsh marigolds
  - Caltha natans — floating marsh marigold
  - Caltha palustris — marsh marigold, cowslip, kingcup, cowflock
- Calypso — calypsoes
  - Calypso bulbosa — calypso, fairy-slipper, nymph-of-the-north
- Calystegia — bindweeds
  - Calystegia sepium — hedge bindweed, wild morning glory
  - Calystegia spithamaea — low bindweed
- Camassia — hyacinths
  - Camassia scilloides — wild hyacinth Threatened
- Campanula — bellflowers
  - Campanula aparinoides — marsh bellflower, bedstraw bedflower, marsh harebell
  - Campanula rotundifolia — American harebell, Scottish bluebell, bluebells of Scotland
- Campanulastrum — bellflowers
  - Campanulastrum americanum — tall bellflower, American bellflower
- Campsis — trumpet vines
  - Campsis radicans — trumpet vine, trumpet creeper
- Canadanthus —
  - Canadanthus modestus — Canada aster, western bog aster, great northern aster, purple northern aster
- Cardamine — toothworts
  - Cardamine bulbosa — spring cress, bulbous cress
  - Cardamine concatenata — cutleaf toothwort, five-parted toothwort, slender toothwort
  - Cardamine diphylla — twoleaf toothwort, broadleaf toothwort, crinkleroot
  - Cardamine douglasii — purple cress, limestone bittercress
  - Cardamine parviflora — small-flowered bittercress, sand bittercress
  - Cardamine pensylvanica — Pennsylvania bittercress, Quaker bittercress
  - Cardamine pratensis var. angustifolia — meadow bittercress
  - Cardamine pratensis var. palustris — cuckoo-flower, lady's smock
- Carex spp.
- Carpinus — hornbeams
  - Carpinus caroliniana — ironwood, American hornbeam, blue beech, musclewood
- Carya — hickories
  - Carya cordiformis — bitternut hickory, swamp hickory, pignut hickory, yellowbud hickory
  - Carya glabra — pignut hickory, sweet pignut, red hickory
  - Carya laciniosa — big shellbark hickory
  - Carya ovata — shagbark hickory, upland hickory, shellbark hickory
- Castanea — chestnuts
  - Castanea dentata — American chestnut, toothed chestnut Endangered
- Castilleja — Indian paintbrushes
  - Castilleja coccinea — scarlet Indian paintbrush, scarlet painted-cup
  - Castilleja raupii — Raup's painted-cup, Raup's Indian paintbrush
  - Castilleja septentrionalis — northern paintbrush, Labrador Indian paintbrush
- Catabrosa — brook grasses
  - Catabrosa aquatica — brook grass, water hairgrass
- Caulophyllum — cohoshes
  - Caulophyllum giganteum
  - Caulophyllum thalictroides — blue cohosh

== Ce ==
- Ceanothus — New Jersey teas
  - Ceanothus americanus — New Jersey tea, redroot, white snowball, mountainsweet
  - Ceanothus herbaceus — narrowleaf New Jersey tea, prairie redroot, inland ceanothus
- Celastrus — bittersweets
  - Celastrus scandens — climbing bittersweet, American bittersweet
- Celtis — hackberries
  - Celtis occidentalis — sugarberry, northern hackberry, false elm, common hackberry
  - Celtis tenuifolia — dwarf hackberry Threatened
- Cenchrus — sandbars
  - Cenchrus longispinus — longspine sandbur
- Cephalanthus — buttonbushes
  - Cephalanthus occidentalis — common buttonbush
- Cerastium — mouse-ear chickweeds
  - Cerastium alpinum — alpine mouse-ear chickweed, alpine chickweed, woolly alpine chickweed
  - Cerastium arvense subsp. strictum — field mouse-ear chickweed, meadow mouse-ear chickweed, prairie mouse-ear chickweed (other subspecies, including the type subsp. arvense, are considered introduced)
  - Cerastium brachypodum — shortstalk mouse-ear chickweed
  - Cerastium nutans — nodding mouse-ear chickweed
  - Cerastium velutinum — long-hairy chickweed
- Ceratophyllum — hornworts
  - Ceratophyllum demersum — common hornwort, coontail
  - Ceratophyllum echinatum — spineless hornwort

== Ch ==
- Chaerophyllum — chervils
  - Chaerophyllum procumbens var. procumbens — spreading chervil
  - Chaerophyllum procumbens var. shortii
- Chamaedaphne — leatherleafs
  - Chamaedaphne calyculata — leatherleaf, dwarf cassandra
- Chamaesyce — spurges
  - Chamaesyce polygonifolia — seaside spurge, seaside sandmat, sea milk-purslane
  - Chamaesyce vermiculata — wormseed spurge, wormseed sandmat, hairy spurge, hairy-stemmed milk-purslane
- Chelone — turtleheads
  - Chelone glabra — white turtlehead
- Chenopodium — goosefeet
  - Chenopodium bushianum — village goosefoot
  - Chenopodium capitatum — strawberry blite, strawberry-spinach, Indian paint, Indian ink, strawberry goosefoot
  - Chenopodium foggii — Fogg's goosefoot
  - Chenopodium leptophyllum — narrowleaf goosefoot
  - Chenopodium pratericola — pale goosefoot, narrowleaf goosefoot, desert goosefoot
  - Chenopodium salinum
  - Chenopodium simplex — mapleleaf goosefoot, giantseed goosefoot
  - Chenopodium standleyanum — Standley's goosefoot
- Chimaphila — pipsissewas
  - Chimaphila maculata — striped pipsissewa, striped wintergreen, spotted wintergreen, striped prince's pine Endangered
  - Chimaphila umbellata — pipsissewa, prince's pine
- Chrysanthemum — daisies
  - Chrysanthemum arcticum — arctic daisy
- Chrysosplenium — saxifrages
  - Chrysosplenium americanum — golden saxifrage, American watermat, American golden saxifrage
  - Chrysosplenium tetrandrum — alternate-leaf watermat, northern golden saxifrage, northern golden-carpet

== Ci ==
- Cicuta — water hemlocks
  - Cicuta bulbifera — bulb-bearing water hemlock
  - Cicuta maculata — spotted water hemlock, spotted cowbane, musquash-root, beaver-poison
  - Cicuta virosa — MacKenzie's water hemlock, northern water hemlock
- Cimicifuga — cohoshes
  - Cimicifuga racemosa — black cohosh, black snakeroot, black bugbane
- Cinna — wood reedgrasses
  - Cinna arundinacea — stout wood reedgrass
  - Cinna latifolia — slender wood reedgrass, drooping woodreed, broadleaf woodgrass
- Circaea — enchanter's nightshades
  - Circaea alpina — dwarf enchanter's nightshade, small enchanter's nightshade
  - Circaea lutetiana — Canada enchanter's nightshade, southern broadleaf enchanter's nightshade
- Cirsium — thistles
  - Cirsium discolor — pasture thistle, field thistle
  - Cirsium drummondii — Drummond's thistle, short-stem thistle, dwarf thistle
  - Cirsium flodmanii — prairie thistle, woolly thistle, Flodman's thistle
  - Cirsium hillii — Hill's thistle Threatened
  - Cirsium muticum — swamp thistle, dunce nettle, horsetops
  - Cirsium pitcheri — Pitcher's thistle, sand dune thistle

== Cl ==
- Cladium — twigrushes
  - Cladium mariscoides — twigrush, smooth sawgrass
- Claytonia — spring beauties
  - Claytonia caroliniana — Carolina spring beauty
  - Claytonia virginica — eastern spring beauty, narrowleaf spring beauty, Virginia spring beauty
- Clematis — virgin's-bowers
  - Clematis occidentalis — western blue virgin's-bower, purple clematis, rock clematis, purple virgin's-bower
  - Clematis virginiana — Virginia virgin's-bower, Devil's darning-needles
- Clinopodium — dog mints
- Clinopodium acinos (syn. Acinos arvensis) – mother-of-thyme, spring savoury, basil thyme
- Clinopodium vulgare — dog mint, wild basil, cushion calamint
- Clintonia — blue-bead lilies
  - Clintonia borealis — blue-bead lily, cornlily, poisonberry, yellow clintonia

== Co ==
- Coeloglossum — green orchises
  - Coeloglossum viride var. viriscens — long-bract green orchis
  - Coeloglossum viride var. viride — bracted orchid
- Collinsia — horsebalms
  - Collinsia canadensis — Canada horsebalm, northern horsebalm, stoneroot, richweed
  - Collinsia parviflora — bluelips, small blue-eyed Mary
- Collomia — glueseeds
  - Collomia linearis — glueseed, narrowleaf collomia
- Comandra — comandras
  - Comandra umbellata — bastard toadflax, star toadflax
- Comptonia — sweetferns
  - Comptonia peregrina — sweetfern
- Conioselinum — hemlock parsleys
  - Conioselinum chinense — hemlock parsley
- Conopholis— squawroots
  - Conopholis americana — squawroot
- Conyza — fleabanes
  - Conyza canadensis — Canada fleabane, horseweed, butterweed
- Coptis — goldthreads
  - Coptis trifolia — goldthread, canker-root, yellow snakeroot
- Corallorrhiza — coralroots
  - Corallorrhiza maculata — spotted coralroot
  - Corallorhiza odontorhiza — autumn coralroot
  - Corallorrhiza striata — striped coralroot
  - Corallorrhiza trifida — early coralroot, pale coralroot, northern coralroot
- Coreopsis — tickseeds
  - Coreopsis lanceolata — lanceleaf tickseed, garden coreopsis, long-stalked coreopsis
  - Coreopsis tripteris — tall coreopsis
- Corispermum — bugseeds
  - Corispermum americanum — American bugseed
  - Corispermum hookeri — Hooker's bugseed
  - Corispermum pallasii — Pallas' bugseed
  - Corispermum villosum — hairy bugseed
- Cornus — dogwoods
  - Cornus alternifolia — alternate-leaf dogwood, pagoda dogwood, green osier
  - Cornus amomum subsp. amomum — silky dogwood, red willow, swamp dogwood
  - Cornus amomum subsp. obliqua
  - Cornus canadensis — Canada bunchberry, crackerberry, dwarf cornel
  - Cornus drummondii — roughleaf dogwood, Drummond's dogwood
  - Cornus florida — eastern flowering dogwood, common white dogwood
  - Cornus foemina — stiff dogwood, English dogwood, stiff cornel
  - Cornus rugosa — roundleaf dogwood
  - Cornus stolonifera — red-osier dogwood
- Corydalis — corydalises
  - Corydalis aurea — golden corydalis
  - Corydalis flavula — yellow corydalis
  - Corydalis sempervirens — pale corydalis
- Corylus — hazelnuts
  - Corylus americana — American hazelnut, American filbert
  - Corylus cornuta — beaked hazelnut, beaked filbert

== Cr ==
- Crassula — pygmyweeds
  - Crassula aquatica — water pygmyweed
- Crataegus — hawthorns
  - Crataegus apiomorpha
  - Crataegus beata
  - Crataegus brainerdii — Brainerd's hawthorn
  - Crataegus calpodendron — pear hawthorn
  - Crataegus chrysocarpa var. aboriginum
  - Crataegus chrysocarpa var. chrysocarpa — fireberry hawthorn, roundleaf hawthorn
  - Crataegus chrysocarpa var. phoenicea
  - Crataegus coccinea var. coccinea — scarlet hawthorn
  - Crataegus coccinea var. fulleriana — Fuller's hawthorn
  - Crataegus cognata — white-anthered frosted hawthorn
  - Crataegus comptacta
  - Crataegus crus-galli — cockspur hawthorn
  - Crataegus dilatata — broadleaf hawthorn
  - Crataegus dissona
  - Crataegus dodgei var. dodgei — Dodge's hawthorn
  - Crataegus dodgei var. flavida
  - Crataegus douglasii — black hawthorn, Douglas' hawthorn
  - Crataegus flabellata — fanleaf hawthorn, Bosc's thorn, New England hawthorn
  - Crataegus formosa
  - Crataegus irrasa — unshorn thorn, Blanchard's thorn
  - Crataegus lumaria
  - Crataegus macracantha — longthorn hawthorn, largethorn hawthorn
  - Crataegus macrosperma — bigfruit hawthorn, variable thorn
  - Crataegus magniflora
  - Crataegus margeretta
  - Crataegus mollis — downy hawthorn, red haw
  - Crataegus pennsylvanica
  - Crataegus perjucunda — Middlesex frosted hawthorn
  - Crataegus persimilis — plumleaf hawthorn
  - Crataegus populnea
  - Crataegus pringlei — Pringle's hawthorn
  - Crataegus pruinosa var. parvula
  - Crataegus pruinosa var. pruinosa — waxy-fruit hawthorn, frosted hawthorn
  - Crataegus punctata — dotted hawthorn
  - Crataegus rugosa — broadleaf frosted hawthorn
  - Crataegus scabrida
  - Crataegus schuettei — royal hawthorn
  - Crataegus submollis — Québec hawthorn, Emerson's hawthorn
  - Crataegus suborbiculata — Caughuawaga hawthorn
  - Crataegus succulenta — fleshy hawthorn, longspine hawthorn
  - Crataegus tenax
- Cryptogramma — rockbrakes
  - Cryptogramma acrostichoides — American rockbrake, parsleyfern, mountain parsley
  - Cryptogramma stelleri — Steller's rockbrake, slender cliffbrake, fragile rockbrake
- Cryptotaenia — honeworts
  - Cryptotaenia canadensis — Canada honewort

== Cu ==
- Cuscuta — dodders
  - Cuscuta campestris — field dodder
  - Cuscuta cephalanthi — buttonbush dodder
  - Cuscuta coryli — hazel dodder
  - Cuscuta gronovii — common dodder, scaldweed, swamp dodder, Gronovius dodder

== Cy ==
- Cycloloma — pigweeds
  - Cycloloma atriplicifolium — winged pigweed
- Cynoglossum — comfreys
  - Cynoglossum boreale — northern wild comfrey
- Cyperus — flatsedges
  - Cyperus bipartitus — river cyperus, shining flatsedge
  - Cyperus dentatus — toothed umbrella-sedge
  - Cyperus diandrus — umbrella sedge
  - Cyperus erythrorhizos — redroot flatsedge
  - Cyperus esculentus — yellow nutgrass, yellow umbrella sedge, chufa flatsedge
  - Cyperus flavescens — yellow cyperus
  - Cyperus houghtonii — Houghton's flatsedge, Houghton's cyperus
  - Cyperus lupulinus subsp. macilentus
  - Cyperus odoratus — rusty flatsedge
  - Cyperus schweinitzii — Schweinitz' umbrella sedge, Schweinitz' flatsedge
  - Cyperus squarrosus — awned cyperus
  - Cyperus strigosus — straw-coloured flatsedge
- Cypripedium — lady's-slippers
  - Cypripedium acaule — pink lady's-slipper, pink moccasin flower
  - Cypripedium arietinum — ram's-head lady's-slipper
  - Cypripedium candidum — small white lady's-slipper Endangered
  - Cypripedium parviflorum var. makasin — northern small-flowered yellow lady's-slipper
  - Cypripedium parviflorum var. pubescens — large yellow lady's-slipper, yellow moccasin flower, flat-petalled yellow lady's-slipper, golden slipper, whip-poor-will's shoe
  - Cypripedium passerinum — sparrow's-egg lady's-slipper, Franklin's lady's-slipper
  - Cypripedium reginae — showy lady's-slipper, queen lady's-slipper
- Cystopteris —
  - Cystopteris bulbifera — bulblet bladder fern
  - Cystopteris fragilis — fragile fern, brittle bladder fern
  - Cystopteris laurentiana — Laurentian bladder fern, Laurentian fragile fern
  - Cystopteris montana — mountain bladder fern
  - Cystopteris protrusa — lowland brittle fern
  - Cystopteris tenuis — MacKay's brittle fern
