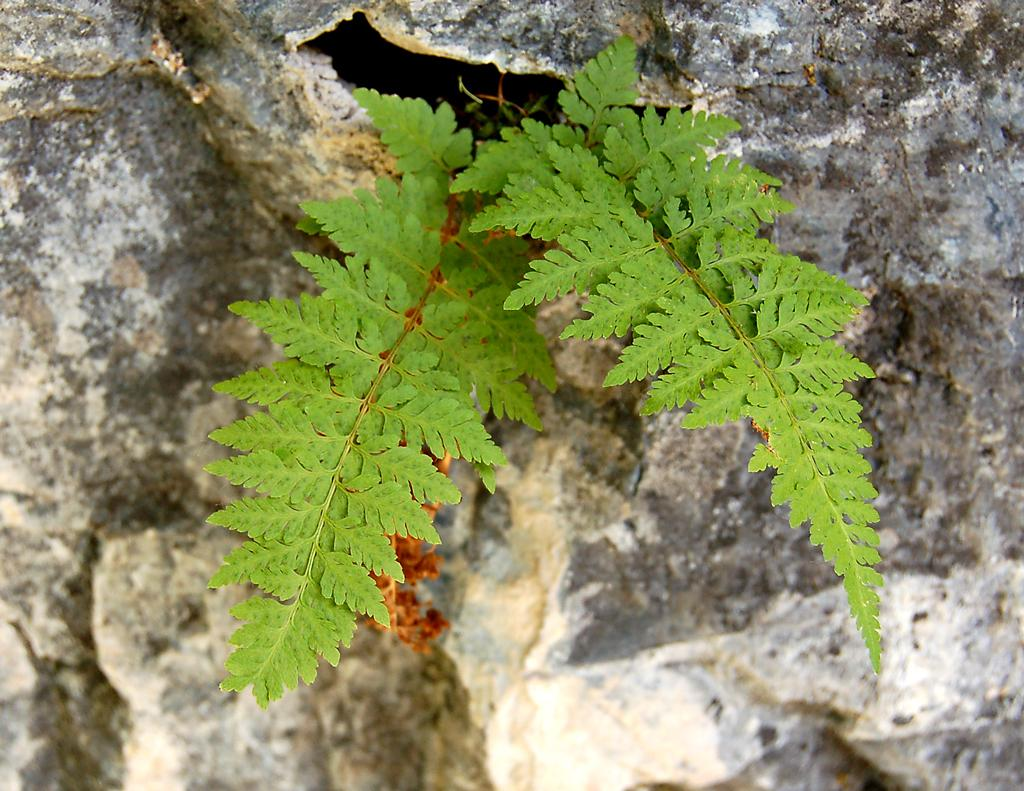
- American Fork Canyon, Utah County

Conservation status
- Vulnerable (NatureServe)

Scientific classification
- Kingdom: Plantae
- Clade: Tracheophytes
- Division: Polypodiophyta
- Class: Polypodiopsida
- Order: Polypodiales
- Suborder: Aspleniineae
- Family: Cystopteridaceae
- Genus: Cystopteris
- Species: C. utahensis

Binomial name
- Cystopteris utahensis Windham & Haufler

Synonyms
- Cystopteris tennesseensis subsp. utahensis (Windham & Haufler) Windham

= Cystopteris utahensis =

Species of fern

Cystopteris utahensis, commonly called the Utah bladderfern is a rare species of fern found in canyons and on sheltered cliff faces with calcareous rocks. It mainly grows on the Colorado Plateau in the western United States, but is also found in a few locations in southern New Mexico and an adjacent area of Texas. Studies of its genetics show that it originates from a natural hybrid of the species Cystopteris bulbifera and Cystopteris reevesiana.

== Description ==
Cystopteris utahensis is a herbaceous perennial with creeping stems that are not like cords with short internodes, the sections between where leaves attach. The stems are not hairy, but is heavily covered at the nodes in the old bases of leaf stems (petioles) from previous years. They also have lanceolate scales.

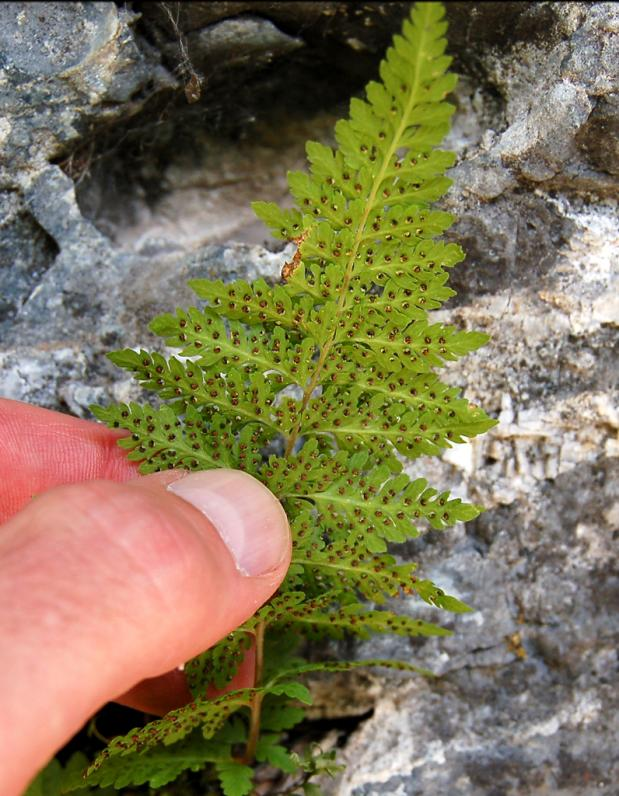
Underside of leaf of Cystopteris utahensis. American Fork Canyon, Utah County, Utah

The leaves of Cystopteris utahensis do not vary in shape and are nearly all clustered at the end of the stems of the stems. The leaf stem attaching each leaf to the main stems of the fern is either green to golden in color, but is darker at base and always shorter than the leaf. The petiole will also have sparse scales near the base. The leaves can be as long as 45 centimeters. The underside of almost every leaf will be covered in the small round brown structures that produce spores called sori. The general outline of the leaves is the classic triangular to wedge shape that is described by botanists as deltate to narrowly deltate. The main shaft of leaf will have glandular hairs and often have misshapen bublets, allowing it to be distinguished from Cystopteris fragilis, a similar species found in much of the range of C. utahensis. The leaflets attached to the main leaf shaft stand out perpendicular to the leaf stem and do not curve or angle towards the leaf tip. The leaves are almost twice divided (2-pinnate-pinnatifid) with each leaflet partially divided into sub-leaflets by deep lobes (pinnae pinnatifid to pinnate-pinnatifid). The edges of the leaves are serrate with the veins of the leaf directed into the teeth and notches.

The sori on the underside of the leaves are cup shaped with an abruptly cut off end, described as a truncate apex by botanists. They have a scattered covering of unicellular, gland tipped hairs. The spores of Cystopteris utahensis are spiny and usually 39–48 micrometres in size.

== Taxonomy ==
Cystopteris utahensis was first described as a separate species by Michael D. Windham and Christopher H. Haufler in 1991. Since that time Windham has coauthored an article with Kathleen M. Pryer in 2022 arguing for synonymizing it with Cystopteris tennesseensis under the name Cystopteris tennesseensis subsp. utahensis. The classification as a subspecies has been accepted by Plants of the World Online as of 2023. However, it continues to be accepted as a full species by World Ferns, World Flora Online, and the USDA Natural Resources Conservation Service PLANTS database (PLANTS).

Cystopteris utahensis is an allopolyploid, a type of hybrid where it has almost all the chromosomes from at least two parents. In the case of C. utahensis its parents are Cystopteris bulbifera and Cystopteris reevesiana. This is similar as the parentage of Cystopteris tennesseensis, giving them their very similar physical appearance despite having come from different hybridization events. The argument for the status of C. utahensis as a separate species rests on its geographic isolation from C. tennesseensis and only having one parent in common. The normal 2n chromosome count for C. utahensis is 168.

=== Names ===
The scientific name of Cystopteris utahensis refers to it being found in the US state of Utah as does the common name of "Utah bladderfern".

== Range and habitat ==
The five western states where Cystopteris utahensis grows are Arizona, Colorado, New Mexico, Texas, and Utah. The majority of the range for the species is in Utah and northern Arizona with only a few isolated populations known from western Colorado and New Mexico. Two other isolated populations are known from the south eastern boarder of New Mexico with Texas. The Colorado population is in Moffat County and the Texas population is in Culberson County.

The habitat of Cystopteris utahensis is cracks and ledges of cliff faces on calcareous stones such as sandstone, limestone, and dacite, a rare habitat type. They are found from an elevation of 1300–2700 meters. In 1997 NatureServe evaluated Cystopteris utahensis as vulnerable (G3). At the state level it has not evaluated it in either Texas or New Mexico and has evaluated at the state level as imperiled (S2) in Arizona and critically imperiled (S1) in Colorado and Utah.
