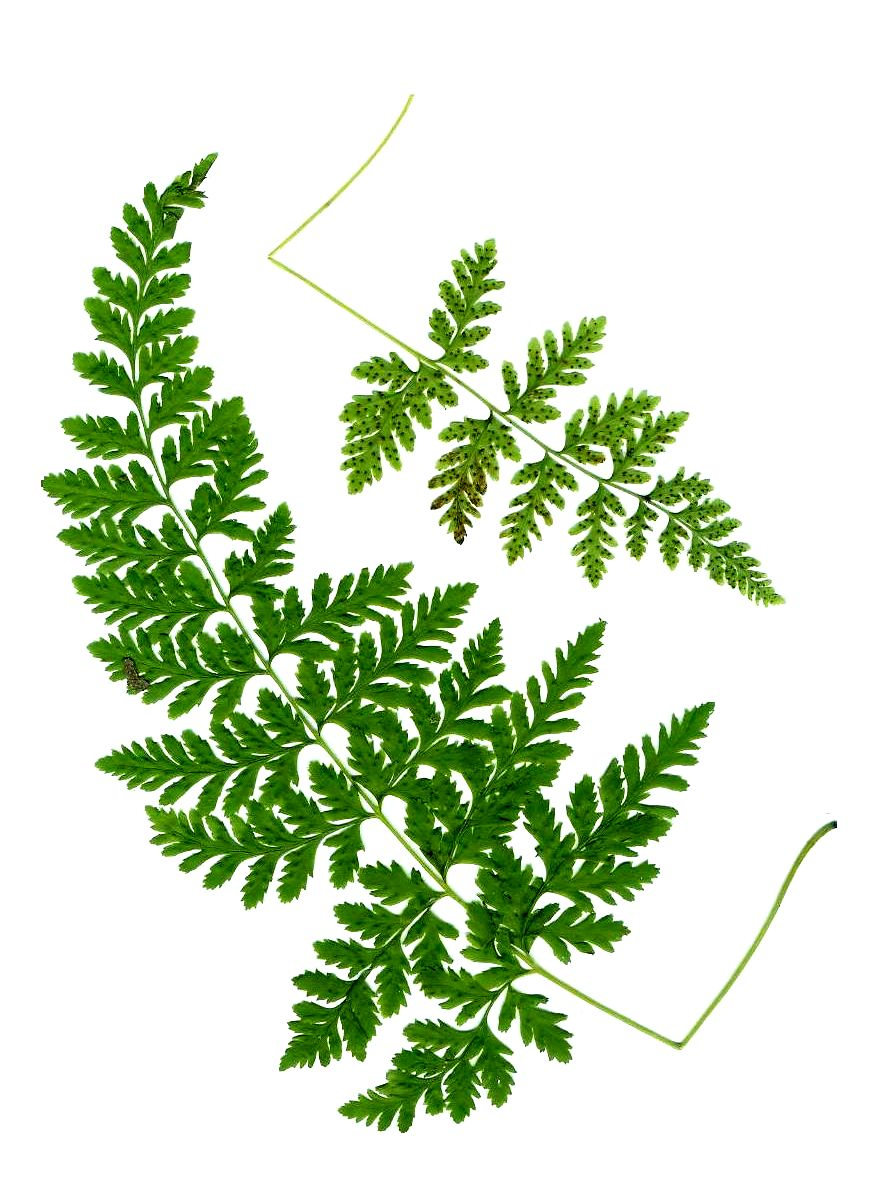

Conservation status
- Secure (NatureServe)

Scientific classification
- Kingdom: Plantae
- Clade: Tracheophytes
- Division: Polypodiophyta
- Class: Polypodiopsida
- Order: Polypodiales
- Suborder: Aspleniineae
- Family: Cystopteridaceae
- Genus: Cystopteris
- Species: C. tenuis

Binomial name
- Cystopteris tenuis (Michx.) Desv.

= Cystopteris tenuis =

Species of fern

Cystopteris tenuis is sometimes known as Mackay's bladder fern or Mackay's fragile fern. It was long considered to be a part of the superspecies for fragile ferns, as Cystopteris fragilis (L.) Bernh. var. mackayi Lawson.

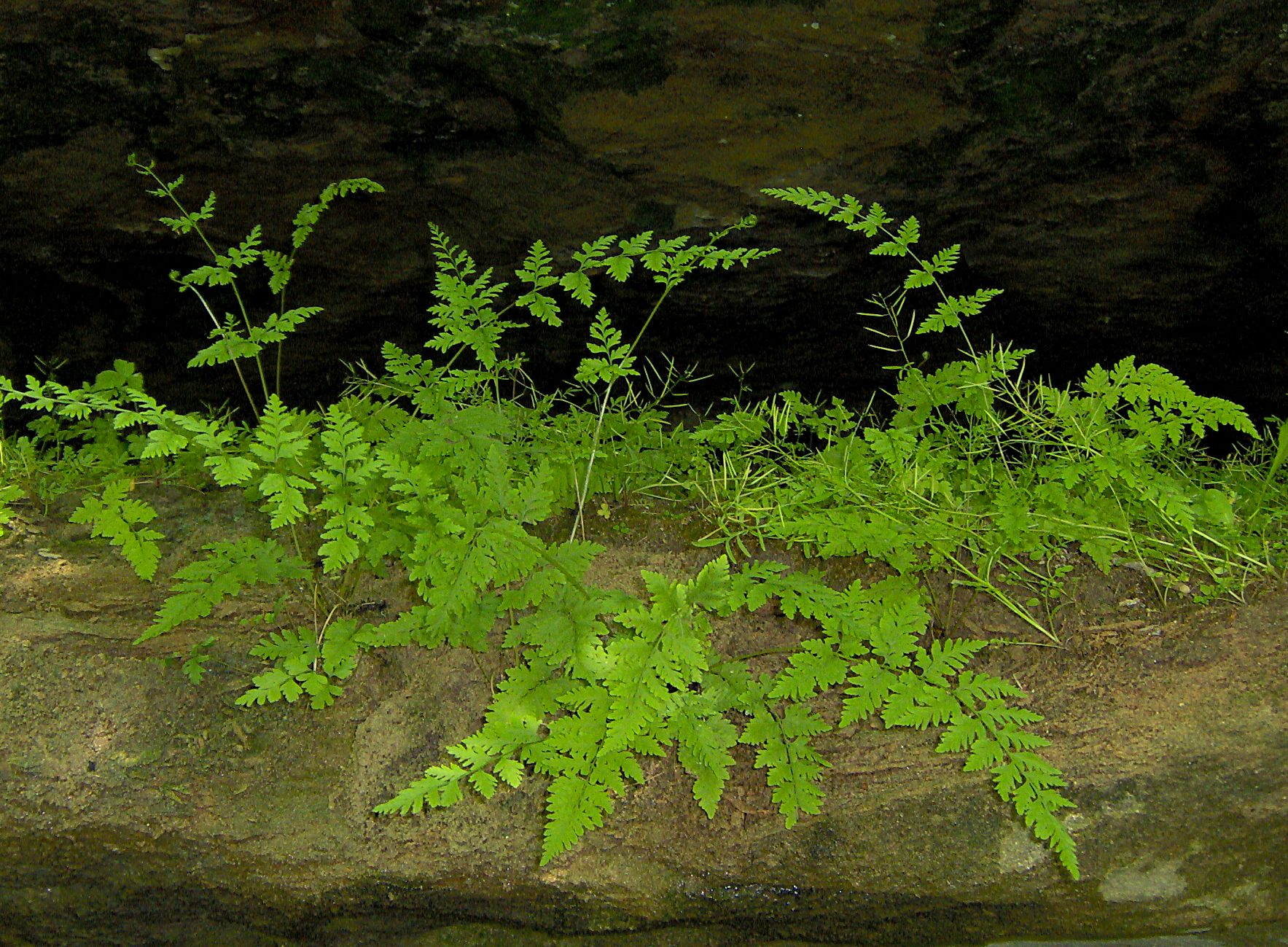
C. tenuis in native habitat

This species is an allotetraploid of hybrid origin (see Cystopteris hybrid complex). The parent diploid species are Cystopteris protrusa and the hypothesized Cystopteris hemifragilis, believed to be an extinct species.

C. tenuis is known to hybridize with C. bulbifera to produce the hybrid C. × illinoensis, with C. tennesseensis to produce the hybrid C. × wagneri, and with C. fragilis and C. protrusa to produce unnamed hybrids (as per Flora of North America).

Mackay's fragile fern grows on rock or in scree, generally in sheltered spots, in the midwestern and northeastern regions of the United States and eastern Canada. It may be distinguished from the somewhat similar Cystopteris tennesseensis by the fact that it grows on acid substrate, while the tennesseensis grows on calcareous substrate. The fronds of C. tenuis are broader, with generally alternate pinnae, while C. tennesseensis is narrower, with generally opposite pinnae.
