= Greenish =

Greenish may refer to:

- Shades of green
- Lucy Greenish (1888–1976), New Zealand architect
- Simon Greenish, British chartered civil engineer and director of Bletchley Park

== See also ==
- Greenish-backed oriole, a species of bird in the family Oriolidae
- Greenish bladder-fern, a fern in the family Cystopteridaceae
- Greenish chestnut moth, a moth in the family Tortricidae
- Greenish darter, a butterfly in the family Hesperiidae
- Greenish elaenia, a species of bird in the family Tyrannidae, the tyrant flycatchers
- Greenish grass-dart, a species of butterfly in the family Hesperiidae, known as a skipper
- Greenish mountain blue, a butterfly in the family Lycaenidae
- Greenish naked-backed fruit bat, a species of megabat in the family Pteropodidae
- Greenish puffleg, a species of hummingbird in the family Trochilidae
- Greenish schiffornis, also greenish mourner or greenish manakin, a species of bird in the family Tityridae
- Greenish tyrannulet, a species of bird in the family Tyrannidae
- Greenish warbler, a widespread leaf warbler species of bird in the family Phylloscopidae
- Greenish yellow bat, a species of vesper bat in the family Vespertilionidae
- Greenish yellow finch, a species of bird in the family Thraupidae
- The Greenish Bird, a Mexican fairy tale collected by Joel Gomez in La Encantada, Texas, United States
