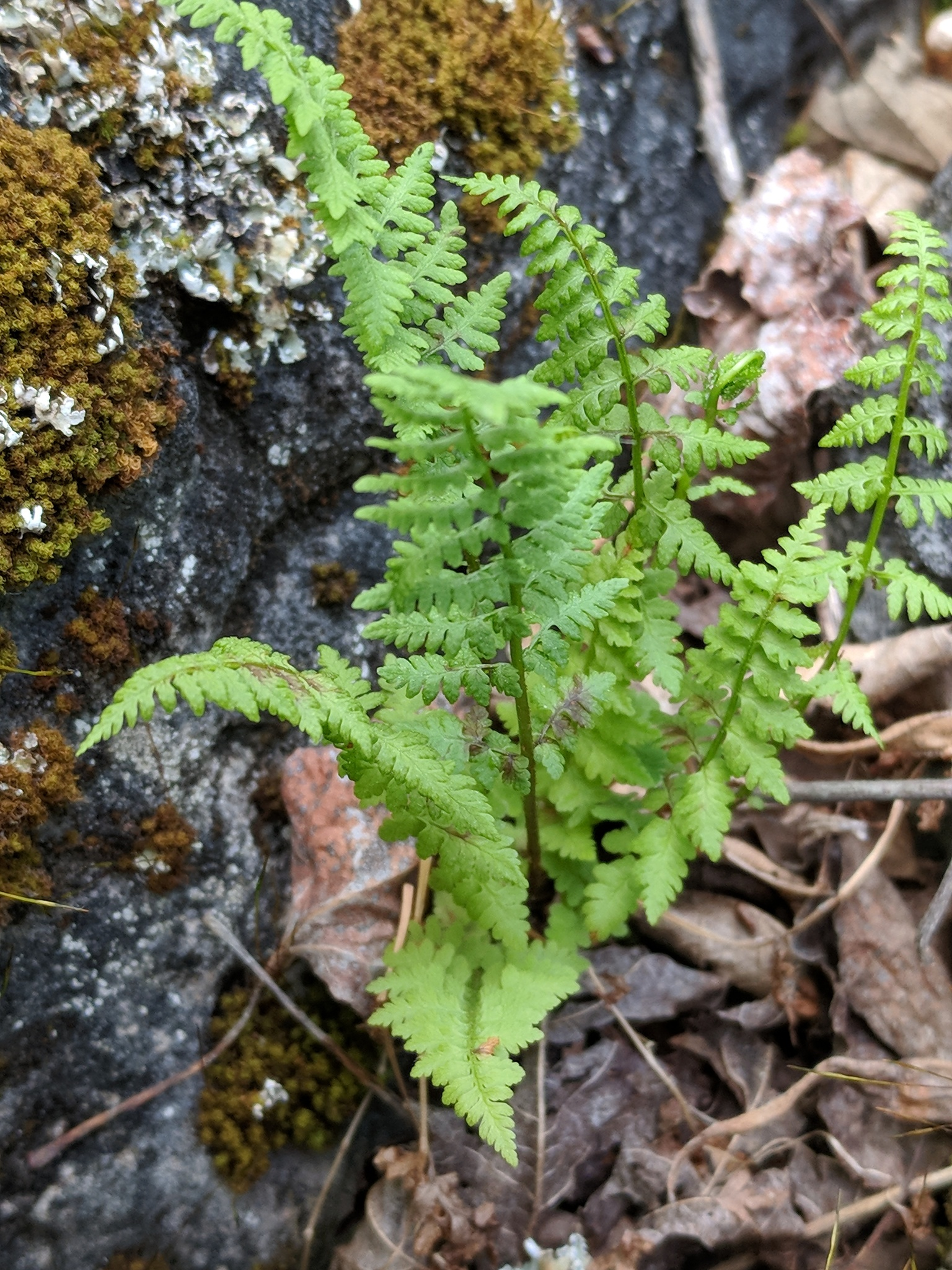

Scientific classification
- Kingdom: Plantae
- Clade: Tracheophytes
- Division: Polypodiophyta
- Class: Polypodiopsida
- Order: Polypodiales
- Suborder: Aspleniineae
- Family: Cystopteridaceae
- Genus: Cystopteris
- Species: C. laurentiana

Binomial name
- Cystopteris laurentiana (Weath.) Blasdell

Synonyms
- Cystopteris fragilis var. laurentiana Weath.; Cystopteris × tennesseensis subsp. laurentiana (Weath.) Windham

= Cystopteris laurentiana =

Species of plant

Cystopteris laurentiana, commonly called Laurentian bladderfern or St. Lawrence bladderfern, is a species of fern in the family Cystopteridaceae. It is native to eastern North America, primarily in the Great Lakes-St. Lawrence lowlands, but there are also scattered occurrences in New England and Atlantic Canada. It grows on cliffs composed of calcareous rocks, such as limestone, dolostone and diabase.

== Taxonomy ==
Cystopteris laurentiana is a fertile allohexaploid hybrid between C. bulbifera (bulblet fern) and C. fragilis (fragile fern). The scientific name is therefore sometimes written as C. × laurentiana, which denotes hybrid origin.
