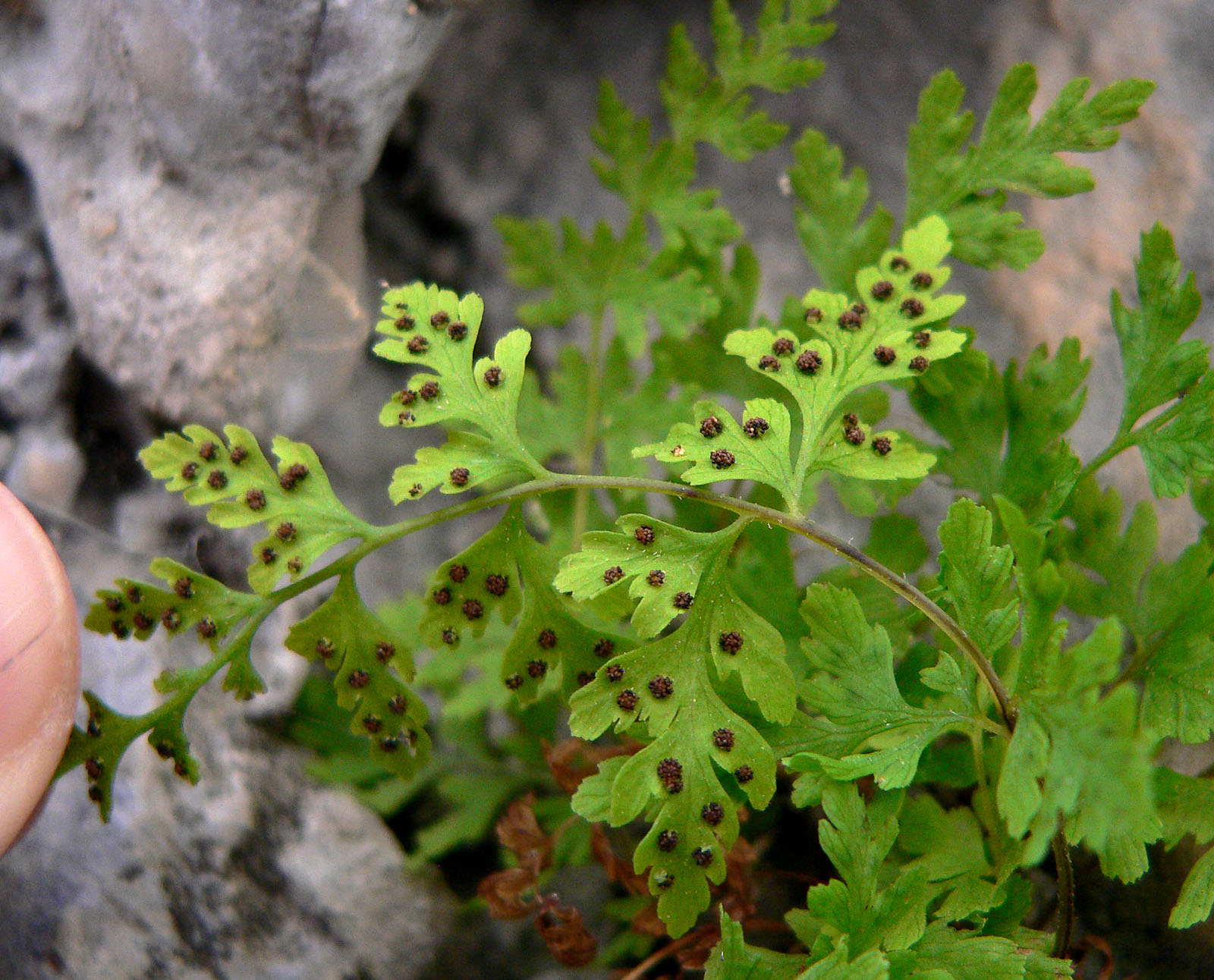
- Cystopteris fragilis

Scientific classification
- Kingdom: Plantae
- Clade: Embryophytes
- Clade: Tracheophytes
- Division: Polypodiophyta
- Class: Polypodiopsida
- Order: Polypodiales
- Suborder: Aspleniineae
- Family: Cystopteridaceae
- Genus: Cystopteris; Bernh.

Type species
- Cystopteris fragilis (von Linné) Bernhardi

Species
- See text

Synonyms
- Cyclopteris Schrader ex Gray non Brongniart; Cyste Dulac; Cystea Smith; Cystoathyrium Ching; Filicula Séguier; Filix Adanson non Ludwig non Séguier; Filix-fragilis Gillb.; Rhizomatopteris A.P.Khokhr.

= Cystopteris =

Genus of ferns

Cystopteris is a genus of ferns in the family Cystopteridaceae. These are known generally as bladderferns or fragile ferns. They grow in temperate areas worldwide. This is a very diverse genus and within a species individuals can look quite different, especially in harsh environments where stress stunts their growth. They hybridize easily with each other and identifying an individual can be challenging. In general these are rhizomatous perennials which grow in rocks or soil. Their leaves are multiply pinnate, in that each leaflet is divided into smaller parts. The sori are usually rounded and covered in an inflated bladder-like indusium.

== Phylogeny ==
This genus includes the following species:

Phylogeny from Fern Tree of Life

- Cystopteris
  - - section Emarginatae
      C. montana (Lam.) Desvaux (Mountain bladderfern)
  - - section Khokhrjakovia
      - C. pellucida (Franchet) Ching
      - - C. moupinensis Franchet
        - C. sudetica Braun & Milde (Sudeten bubble fern)
    - section Cystopteris
      - - C. chinensis (Ching) R.Wei & X.C.Zhang
        - - C. bulbifera (von Linné) Bernhardi (Bulblet fern)
          - - C. tennesseensis Shaver (Tennessee bladderfern)
            - C. utahensis Windham & Haufler (Utah bladderfern)
      - - C. protrusa (Weatherby) Blasdell (Lowland bladderfern)
        - - - - C. douglasii Hooker (Douglas' bladderfern)
              - C. sandwicensis Brackenridge
            - - C. tasmanica Hooker
              - - C. alpina (Lam.) Desvaux (Alpine bubble fern)
                - C. tenuis (Michaux) Desvaux (Upland brittle fern)
          - - C. diaphana (Bory) Blasdell (Greenish/diaphanous bladder-fern)
            - - - C. reevesiana Lellinger (Reeves' bladderfern)
                - C. fragilis (von Linné) Bernhardi (Brittle bladderfern)
              - - C. membranifolia Mickel
                - - C. laurentiana (Weatherby) Blasdell (St. Lawrence bladderfern)
                  - C. millefolia Mickel & Tejero

Other species include:
- C. apiiformis Gand.
- C. deqinensis Wang
- C. dickieana (Dickie's bladderfern)
- †C. fumariacea Wessel & Weber
- "C. hemifragilis" (an undiscovered or extinct diploid)
- C. ulei Christ 1900 (Ules bladderfern)

== Hybrids ==
The hybrid species include:

- C. fragilis (C. "hemifragilis" × C. reevesiana; allotetraploid)
- C. laurentiana (C. bulbifera × C. fragilis; allohexaploid)
- C. tennesseensis (C. bulbifera × C. protrusa; allotetraploid)
- C. tenuis (C. "hemifragilis" × C. protrusa; allotetraploid)
- C. utahensis (C. reevesiana × C. bulbifera; allotetraploid)

Non-species hybrids include:

- Cystopteris × christii Hahne 1904 (C. fragilis × C. montana)
- Cystopteris × illinoensis Moran 1982 (C. bulbifera × C. tenuis; allotriploid)
- Cystopteris × montserratii Prada & Salvo 1985 (C. dickieana × C. fragilis)
- Cystopteris × vidae Fraser-Jenkins & Parris 2021 (C. alpina × C. fragilis)
- Cystopteris × wagneri Moran 1983 (C. tennesseensis × C. tenuis; allo-allotetraploid)
- Cystopteris fragilis × Cystopteris tenuis (allo-allotetraploid)
- Cystopteris protrusa × Cystopteris tennesseensis (allotriploid)
