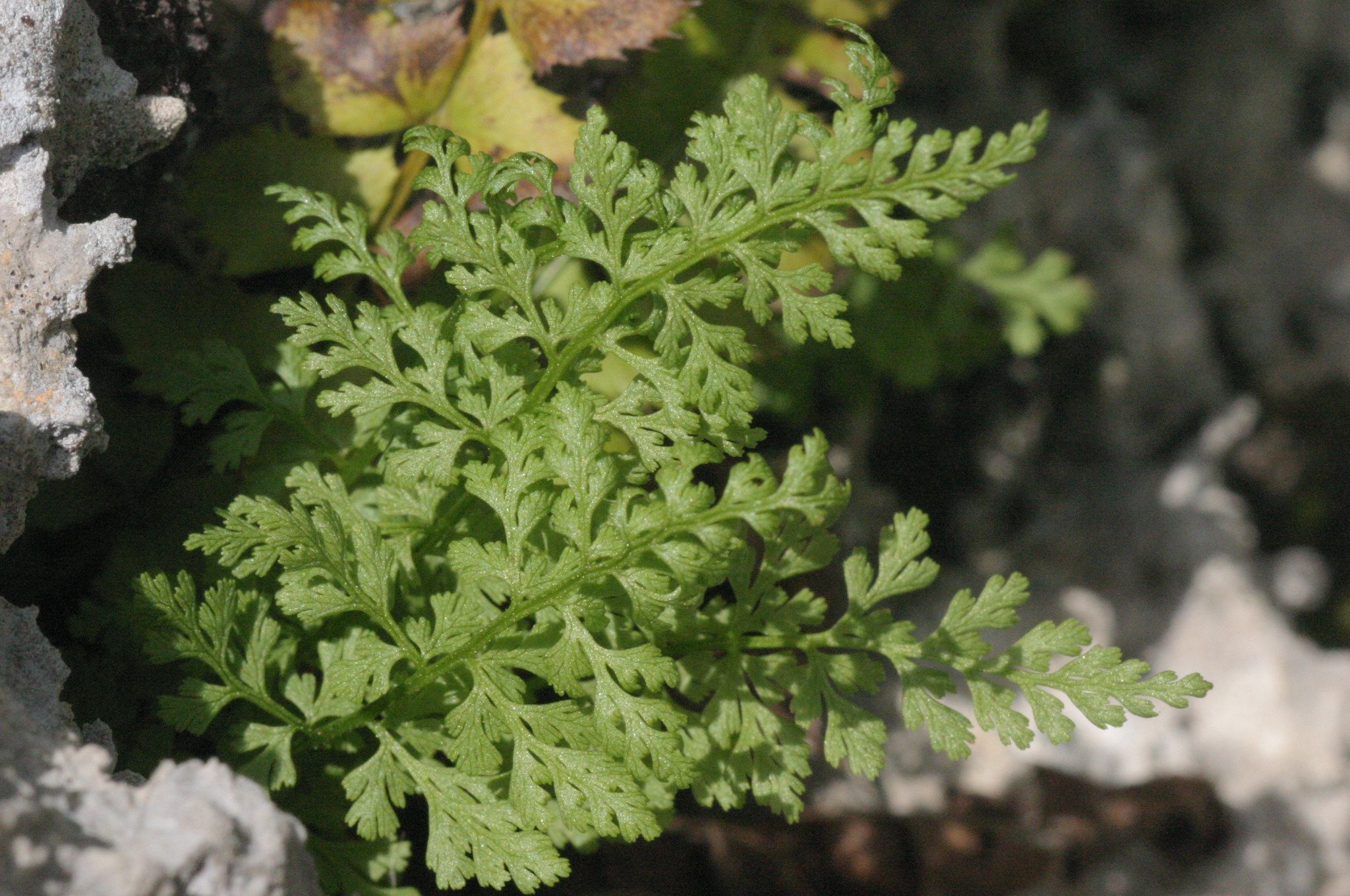

Scientific classification
- Kingdom: Plantae
- Clade: Embryophytes
- Clade: Tracheophytes
- Division: Polypodiophyta
- Class: Polypodiopsida
- Order: Polypodiales
- Suborder: Aspleniineae
- Family: Cystopteridaceae
- Genus: Cystopteris
- Species: C. alpina

Binomial name
- Cystopteris alpina (Lamarck) Desvaux

= Cystopteris alpina =

Species of fern

Cystopteris alpina is a fern in the family Cystopteridaceae. It is closely related to C. fragilis and has been treated as conspecific with that species by many authors. However, according to the Flora of North America, it is an allopolyploid species of hybrid origin, with Cystopteris montana as one probable parent. It is known to hybridise with C. fragilis in Scandinavia and intermediate plants possibly of hybrid origin are known from North Wales.

== Distribution ==
Cystopteris alpina is a montane species occurring through most of Europe with populations extending into Russia and West-Asian mountain regions. It is widely distributed through Northern Scandinavia, the Alps and the Pyrenees. In Britain it is thought to be extinct having only been known from one locality in Upper Teesdale where it was last recorded in 1911.

== Ecology ==
Cystopteris alpina is restricted to limestone in damp locations mainly in upland areas.
