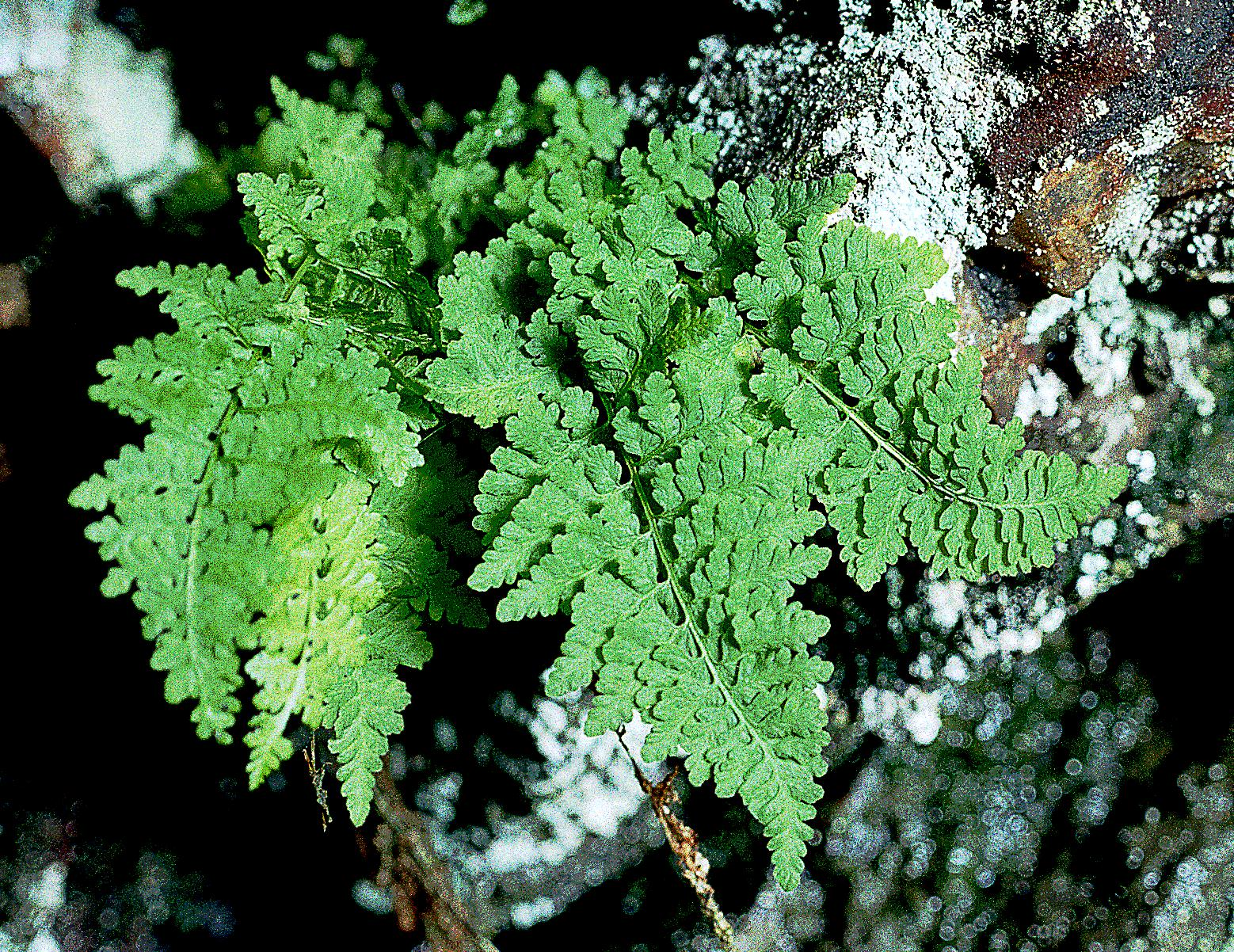
- Cystopteris dickieana at its type locality on the Aberdeen coast

Scientific classification
- Kingdom: Plantae
- Clade: Tracheophytes
- Division: Polypodiophyta
- Class: Polypodiopsida
- Order: Polypodiales
- Suborder: Aspleniineae
- Family: Cystopteridaceae
- Genus: Cystopteris
- Species: C. dickieana

Binomial name
- Cystopteris dickieana Sim

= Cystopteris dickieana =

Dickie's bladder-fern

Species of fern

Cystopteris dickieana, commonly known as Dickie's bladder-fern, is a fern with a wide distribution in the Northern Hemisphere. There is debate amongst botanists as to whether it is a species in its own right, or a variety or subspecies of C. fragilis.

== Distribution and habitat ==
C. dickieana is native to several European countries including Scotland, Iceland, Norway, Sweden, Switzerland, and Russia, and in North America in Canada and the United States, and also north Africa in the Atlas Mountains. It is typically found in montane habitats below the tree-line, although it also grows at lower altitudes in locations with cool summers.

== Discovery and Victorian collectors ==
The first recorded discovery of the plant was made by William Knight, Professor of Natural Philosophy at Marischal College, Aberdeen in Scotland. Knight came across a small population growing on base-rich rocks in a sea cave (known locally as a "yawn") on the coast of Kincardineshire. The first publication to record it was the 1838 Flora Aberdonenis which included a note of its occurrence written by a pupil of Knight's, George Dickie. Dickie also sent a live specimen to Robert Sim, a nurseryman from Kent, who believed it to be a new species and published his views in the 1848 edition of the Gardener's and Farmer's Journal, naming it C. dickieana.

Rarer British ferns came under severe threat from Victorian fern collectors in the mid 19th century in Scotland, a period of collecting that became known as Pteridomania (or "fern-fever"). In 1860 Dickie reported that the original colony had been collected to extinction from the yawn where its original discovery had occurred. The evidence for this is conflicting, but today there is a population of more than 100 plants there, where it grows in a roof fissure in the company of Athyrium filix-femina and Dryopteris dilatata.

== Taxonomic controversy ==
Taxonomic classification within the genus Cystopteris is complex. Within a year of Sim's publication Thomas Moore stated his view was that, on balance, Dickie's Bladder-fern was a variety of C. fragilis. Various opinions have been published over the intervening years, with a consensus that C. dickeana was a separate species emerging in the 1930s, although recent research suggests that Moore's caution may have been appropriate. C. dickeana has broader, less divided and more closely spaced pinnae than C. fragilis, and the spores of the former are typically wrinkled and ridged rather than the spiny form of the latter's. However, there are significant variations within the populations of both forms and these characteristics are by no means fixed. On the other hand, there is also evidence that crosses of the two types produce sterile hybrids. C. × montserratii (Prada & Salvo) Fraser-Jenkins is a proposed hybrid between C. dickeana and C. fragilis.

The treatment of Cystopteris in the Flora of North America (1993) regards Cystopteris dickieana as a synonym of Cystopteris fragilis.

== Conservation ==
In the UK the fern's natural population is entirely confined to Scotland, where it occurs at a number of montane locations (up to 420 m altitude) as well as the first-discovered coastal cave; it is protected under the Wildlife and Countryside Act 1981.

== See also ==
- Flora of Scotland
- Athyrium flexile
