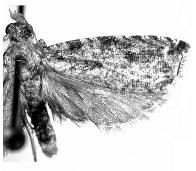

Scientific classification
- Kingdom: Animalia
- Phylum: Arthropoda
- Class: Insecta
- Order: Lepidoptera
- Family: Tortricidae
- Genus: Fibuloides
- Species: F. trapezoidea

Binomial name
- Fibuloides trapezoidea Zhang & Li, 2011

= Fibuloides trapezoidea =

Species of moth

Fibuloides trapezoidea is a moth of the family Tortricidae. It is known from Guizhou in China.

It is similar to Fibuloides cyanopsis in the shape of uncus and socius, but can be distinguished by the trapezioidal cucullus and the absence of the enlarged, flattened bristles on the neck of valva. In F. cyanopsis the cucullus is ovate and the neck of valva has two or more short enlarged, flattened bristles on its ventral side.

== Description. ==
The forewing length is 6.5 mm. The head is vertex with gray scales and the antenna are light brown. The thorax and tegula are gray intermixed with light brown. The forewing is elongate triangular, with a dark gray ground color. The hindwing and cilia are gray. The legs are gray, tarsi with brown rings.

== Etymology ==
The specific name is derived from Latin trapezoideus (meaning shaped like a trapezoid), referring to the shape of the cucullus.
