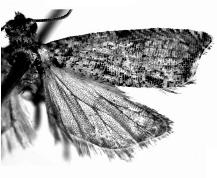

Scientific classification
- Kingdom: Animalia
- Phylum: Arthropoda
- Class: Insecta
- Order: Lepidoptera
- Family: Tortricidae
- Genus: Fibuloides
- Species: F. elongata

Binomial name
- Fibuloides elongata (Zhang & Li, 2005)

Synonyms
- Eucoenogenes elongata Zhang & Li, 2005

= Fibuloides elongata =

Species of moth

Fibuloides elongata is a moth of the family Tortricidae. It is known from Yunnan, China.
