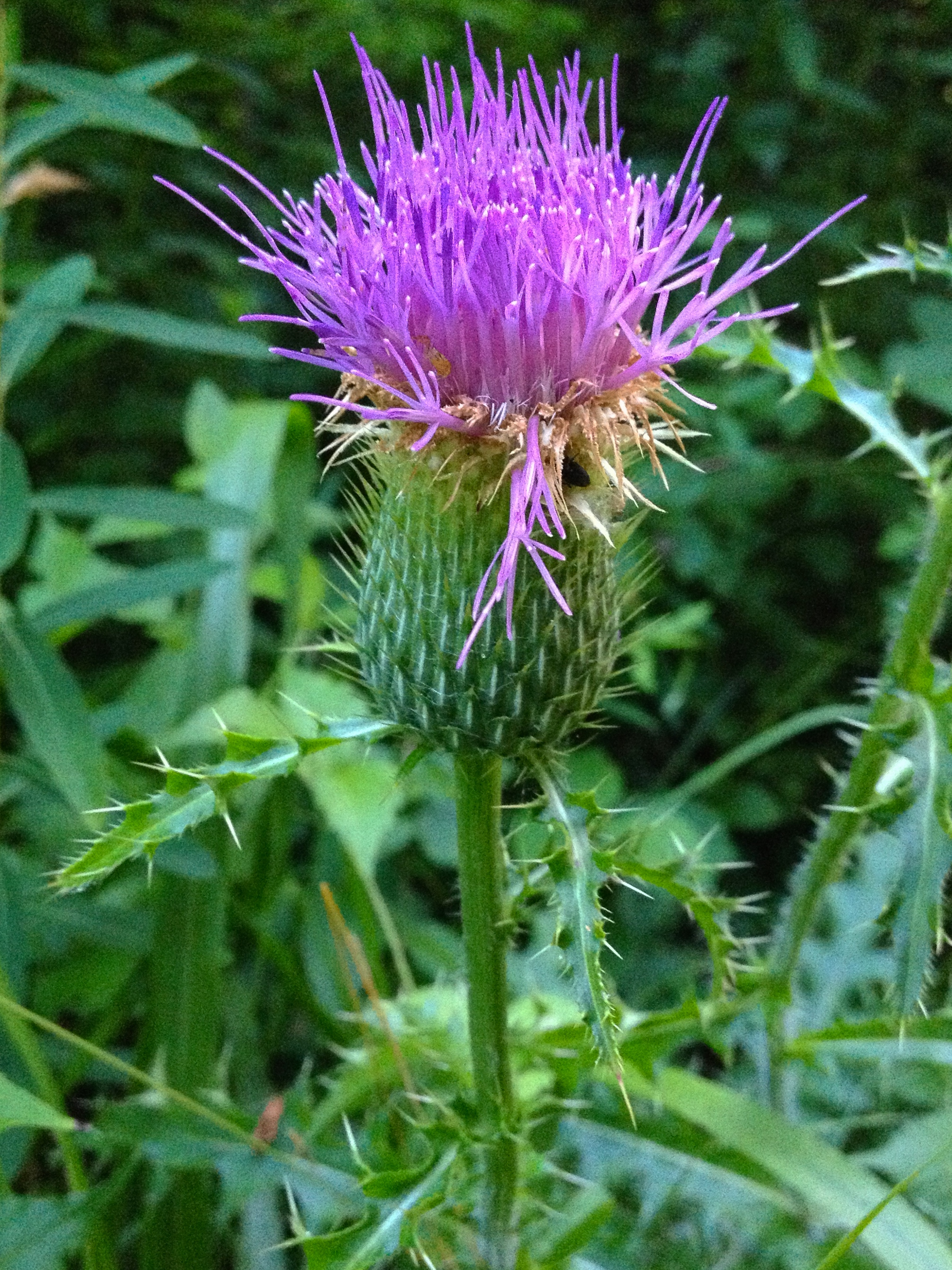

Scientific classification
- Kingdom: Plantae
- Clade: Tracheophytes
- Clade: Angiosperms
- Clade: Eudicots
- Clade: Asterids
- Order: Asterales
- Family: Asteraceae
- Genus: Cirsium
- Species: C. pumilum

Binomial name
- Cirsium pumilum (Nutt.) Spreng.

Synonyms
- Synonymy: Carduus hillii (Canby) Porter, syn of var. hillii; Carduus odoratus (Barton) Porter; Carduus odoratus Muhl.; Carduus pumilus Nutt. 1818 not Vill. 1788; Cirsium odoratum Petr.; Cnicus odaratus Muhl. ex Steud.; Cnicus odoratus Britton, Sterns & Poggenb.; Cnicus pumilus Torr.; Cirsium hillii (Canby) Fernald, syn of var. hillii; Cnicus hillii Canby, syn of var. hillii

= Cirsium pumilum =

Species of thistle

Cirsium pumilum, the pasture thistle, is a North American species of plants in the tribe Cardueae within the family Asteraceae. The species is native to the northeastern and north-central United States as well as to the Canadian Province of Ontario.

Cirsium pumilum is a biennial or perennial herb up to 100 cm (40 inches) tall, blooming once before dying. It has leaf blades up to 30 cm (12 inches) long, with slender to stout spines. There are usually a few flower heads, sweetly scented, with pink, purple or white disc florets but no ray florets.

Varieties

- Cirsium pumilum var. hillii (Canby) B. Boivin - Great Lakes region, upper Mississippi Valley
- Cirsium pumilum var. pumilum - northeastern + east-central United States from Maine to South Carolina west to Ohio
