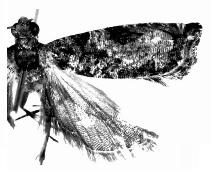

Scientific classification
- Kingdom: Animalia
- Phylum: Arthropoda
- Class: Insecta
- Order: Lepidoptera
- Family: Tortricidae
- Genus: Fibuloides
- Species: F. wuyiensis

Binomial name
- Fibuloides wuyiensis (Zhang & Li, 2005)

Synonyms
- Eucoenogenes wuyiensis Zhang & Li, 2005

= Fibuloides wuyiensis =

Species of moth

Fibuloides wuyiensis is a moth of the family Tortricidae. It is known from Fujian in China.
