= Fibuloides rusticola =

Scientific classification
- Kingdom: Animalia
- Phylum: Arthropoda
- Class: Insecta
- Order: Lepidoptera
- Family: Tortricidae
- Genus: Fibuloides
- Species: F. rusticola

Binomial name
- Fibuloides rusticola Razowski, 2013

Species of moth

Fibuloides rusticola is a species of moth of the family Tortricidae first described by Józef Razowski in 2013. It is found on Seram Island in Indonesia. The habitat consists of bamboo and secondary forests.
