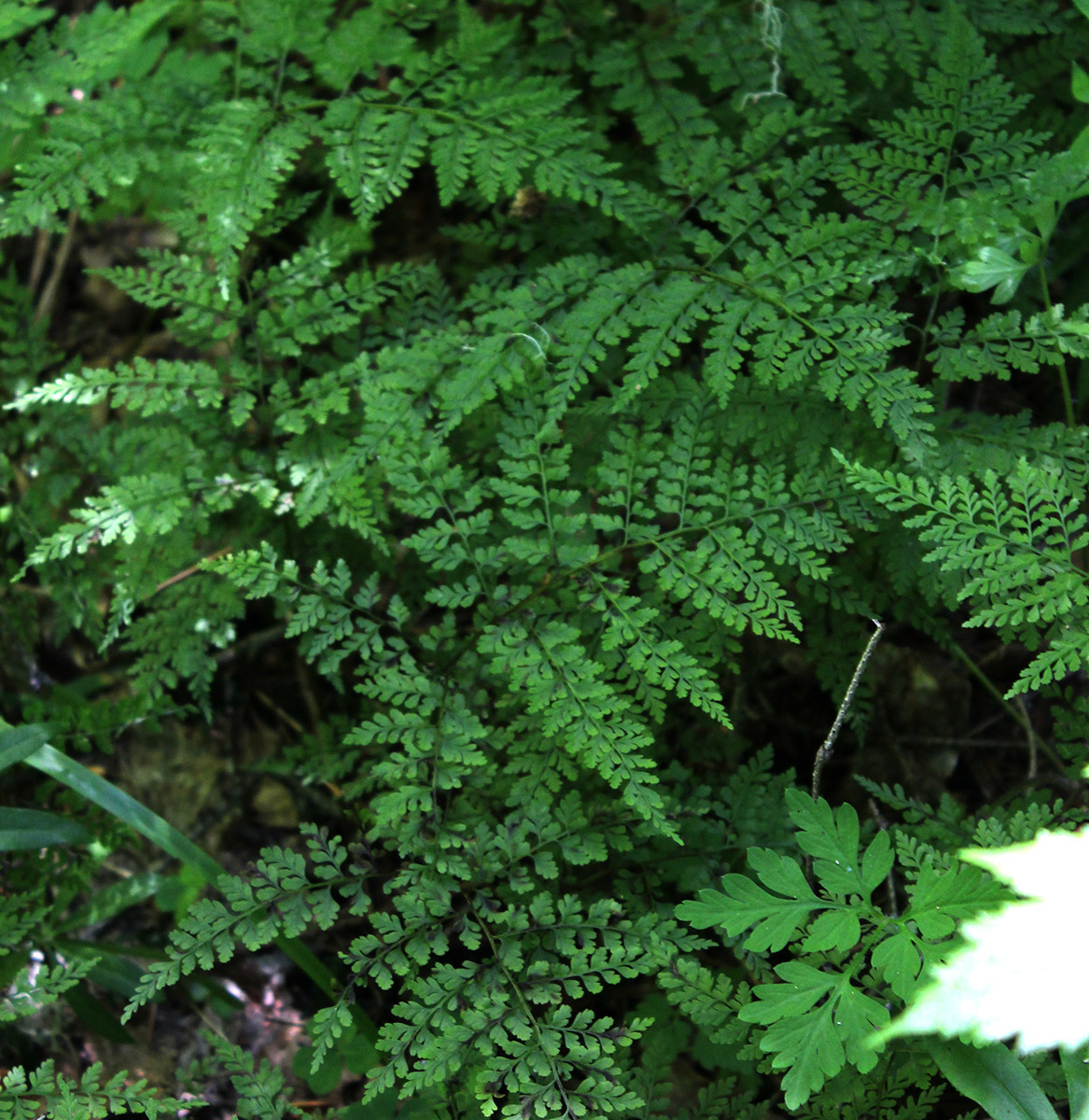
- In Teberda Nature Reserve
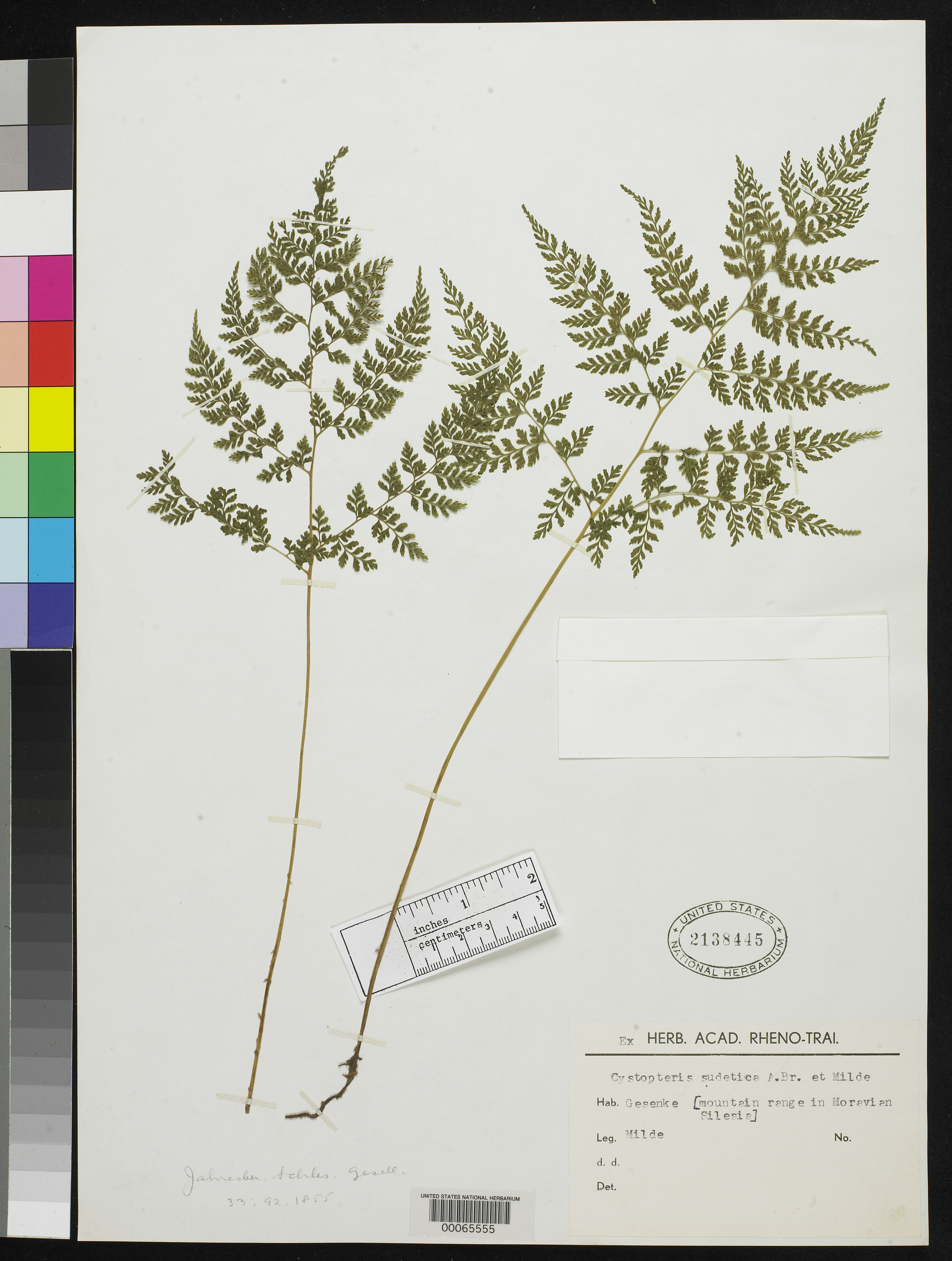
- Herbarium specimen

Conservation status
- Near Threatened (IUCN 3.1)

Scientific classification
- Kingdom: Plantae
- Clade: Embryophytes
- Clade: Tracheophytes
- Division: Polypodiophyta
- Class: Polypodiopsida
- Order: Polypodiales
- Suborder: Aspleniineae
- Family: Cystopteridaceae
- Genus: Cystopteris
- Species: C. sudetica

Binomial name
- Cystopteris sudetica A.Braun & Milde

Synonyms
- Cystopteris leucosoria Schur; Cystopteris sudetica var. leptophylla Milde; Cystopteris sudetica var. vulgaris Milde; Rhizomatopteris sudetica (A.Braun & Milde) A.P.Khokhr.

= Cystopteris sudetica =

Species of fern

Cystopteris sudetica, the Sudeten bladder-fern, is a species of fern in the family Aspleniaceae. It is native to cool-temperate Eurasia. More southerly populations are found at high elevations on alkaline soils, middle latitude and elevation populations are found in ravines and crevices, and northerly populations are found at lower elevations near waterfalls and streams. Overall the species can be found from sea level to 3,300 m (10,800 ft), often in forests. It is a rare species with small populations that are widely separated, and so it has been assessed as Near Threatened, at least in Europe. Its closest relative appears to be Cystopteris moupinensis.
