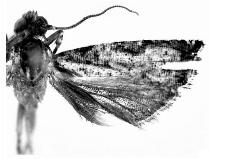

Scientific classification
- Kingdom: Animalia
- Phylum: Arthropoda
- Class: Insecta
- Order: Lepidoptera
- Family: Tortricidae
- Genus: Fibuloides
- Species: F. modificana

Binomial name
- Fibuloides modificana Kuznetsov, 1997

= Fibuloides modificana =

Species of moth

Fibuloides modificana is a moth of the family Tortricidae. It is known from China (Guangxi) and Vietnam.
