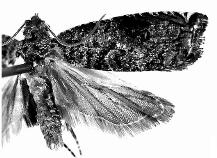

Scientific classification
- Kingdom: Animalia
- Phylum: Arthropoda
- Class: Insecta
- Order: Lepidoptera
- Family: Tortricidae
- Genus: Fibuloides
- Species: F. japonica

Binomial name
- Fibuloides japonica (Kawabe, 1978)

Synonyms
- Eucoenogenes japonica Kawabe, 1978

= Fibuloides japonica =

Species of moth

Fibuloides japonica is a moth of the family Tortricidae. It is known from China (Zhejiang, Anhui, Fujian, Henan, Hubei, Hunan, Sichuan, Guizhou, Shaanxi), Taiwan, Korea and Japan.
