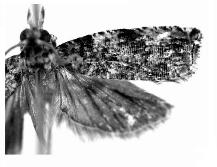

Scientific classification
- Kingdom: Animalia
- Phylum: Arthropoda
- Class: Insecta
- Order: Lepidoptera
- Family: Tortricidae
- Genus: Fibuloides
- Species: F. levatana

Binomial name
- Fibuloides levatana (Kuznetsov, 1997)

Synonyms
- Eucoenogenes levatana Kuznetsov, 1997

= Fibuloides levatana =

Species of moth

Fibuloides levatana is a moth of the family Tortricidae. It is known from China (Zhejiang, Fujian) and Vietnam.
