= Fibuloides neaera =

Scientific classification
- Kingdom: Animalia
- Phylum: Arthropoda
- Class: Insecta
- Order: Lepidoptera
- Family: Tortricidae
- Genus: Fibuloides
- Species: F. neaera

Binomial name
- Fibuloides neaera (Meyrick, 1912)

Synonyms
- Acroclita neaera Meyrick, 1912

Species of moth

Fibuloides neaera is a moth of the family Tortricidae first described by Edward Meyrick in 1912. It is found in Sri Lanka.
