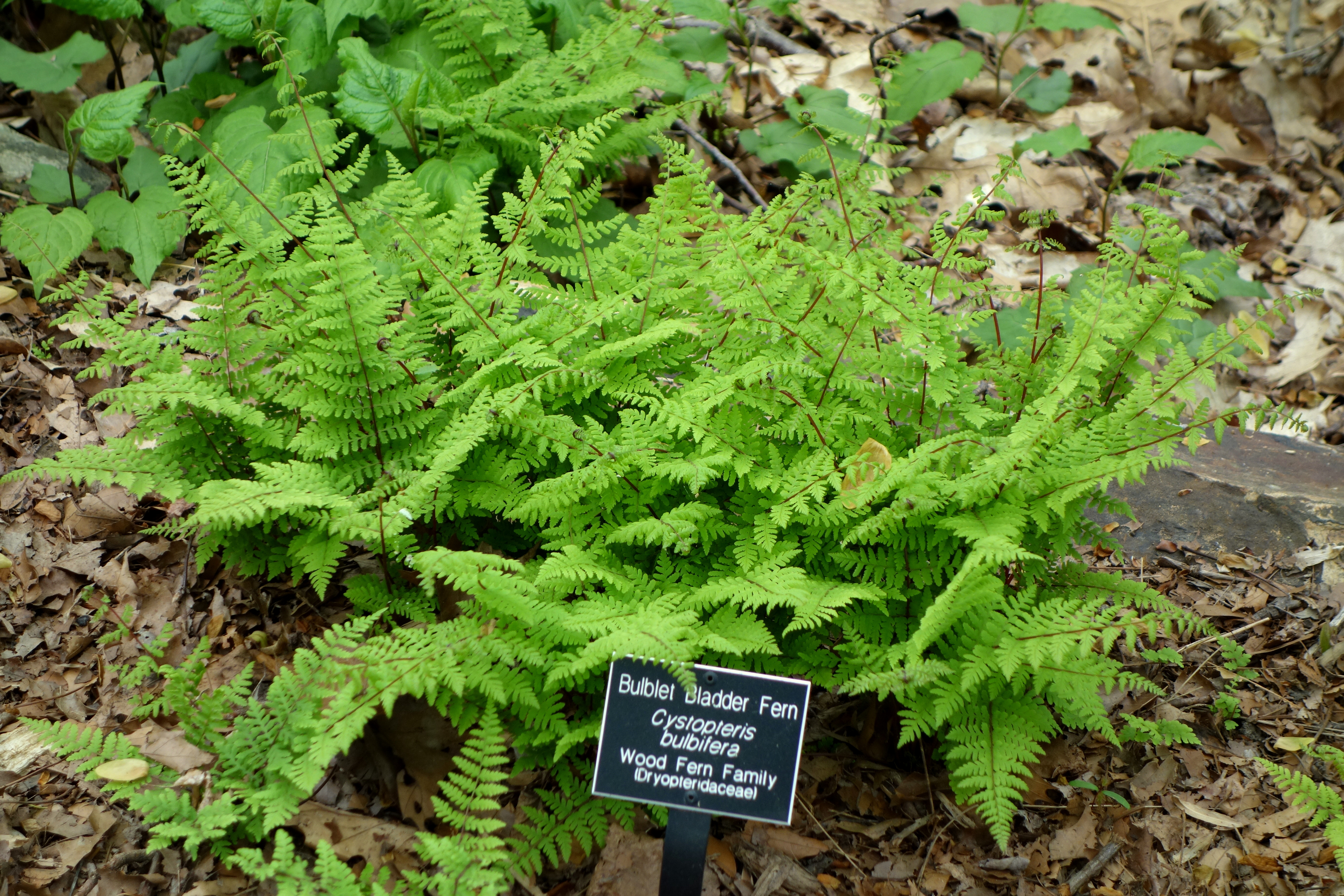

Conservation status
- Secure (NatureServe)

Scientific classification
- Kingdom: Plantae
- Clade: Tracheophytes
- Division: Polypodiophyta
- Class: Polypodiopsida
- Order: Polypodiales
- Suborder: Aspleniineae
- Family: Cystopteridaceae
- Genus: Cystopteris
- Species: C. bulbifera

Binomial name
- Cystopteris bulbifera (L.) Bernh.

Synonyms
- Aspidium bulbiferum (L.) Sw.; Cystea bulbifera (L.) Watt; Cystopteris atomaria C. Presl; Filix bulbifera (L.) Underw.; Polypodium bulbiferum L.

= Cystopteris bulbifera =

Bulblet fern

Species of fern

Cystopteris bulbifera, with the common name bulblet fern, bulblet bladderfern, or bulblet fragile fern is a fern in the family Cystopteridaceae.

== Distribution ==
The fern is native to eastern Canada, the Midwestern and Eastern United States, and two disjunct populations in the Southwestern United States.

It is usually found on calcareous substrates such as limestone. It commonly festoons limestone cave openings. While most commonly found on vertical rock faces, it also grows in rocky scree.

== Description ==
Cystopteris bulbifera is a low-growing rock fern with creeping stems and narrow elongate deltate fronds which grow to 75 cm (30 in). C. bulbifera is unusual among ferns in producing bulblets along the bottom of the fronds. This is one of the easiest Cystopteris species to identify.

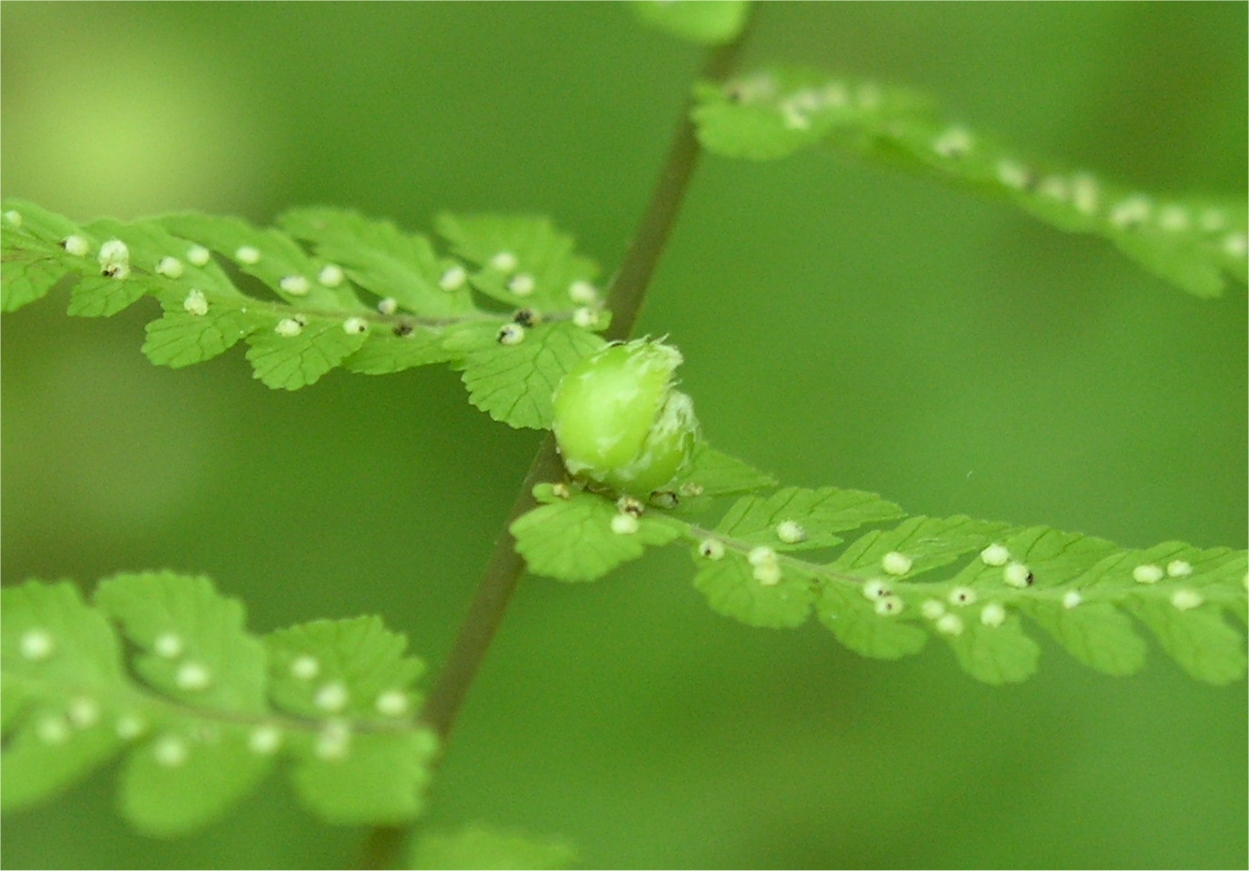
Closeup of bulblet

=== Hybrids ===
This species is known to hybridize with Cystopteris fragilis, Cystopteris protrusa, Cystopteris reevesiana, and Cystopteris tenuis. Hybrids with C. fragilis have given rise to the allohexaploid species Cystopteris laurentiana. Hybrids with Cystopteris protrusa have given rise to the allotetraploid species Cystopteris tennesseensis. The hybrid with C. reevesiana has given rise to the allotetraploid species Cystopteris utahensis. The hybrid with C. tenuis is known as C. × illinoensis, an allotriploid. Also see Cystopteris hybrid complex.
