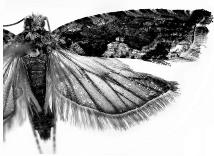
- Fibuloides cyanopsis

Scientific classification
- Kingdom: Animalia
- Phylum: Arthropoda
- Class: Insecta
- Order: Lepidoptera
- Family: Tortricidae
- Tribe: Enarmoniini
- Genus: Fibuloides; Kuznetzov, 1997

= Fibuloides =

Genus of tortrix moths

Fibuloides is a genus of moths belonging to the family Tortricidae.

== Species ==
- Fibuloides aestuosa (Meyrick, 1912)
- Fibuloides biuncana (Kuznetzov, 1997)
- Fibuloides corinthia (Meyrick, 1912)
- Fibuloides crocoptila (Diakonoff, 1968)
- Fibuloides cyanopsis (Meyrick, 1912)
- Fibuloides deltostoma (Diakonoff, 1968)
- Fibuloides elongata (Zhang & Li, 2005)
- Fibuloides euphlebia (Kawabe, 1989)
- Fibuloides japonica (Kawabe, 1978)
- Fibuloides levatana (Kuznetzov, 1997)
- Fibuloides macrosaris (Meyrick, 1938)
- Fibuloides metaspra (Diakonoff, 1983)
- Fibuloides minuta Horak, 2006
- Fibuloides modificana Kuznetzov, 1997
- Fibuloides munda (Diakonoff, 1983)
- Fibuloides neaera (Meyrick, 1912)
- Fibuloides phycitipalpiaa Horak, 2006
- Fibuloides pythonias (Meyrick, 1910)
- Fibuloides rusticola Razowski, 2013
- Fibuloides segregana (Kuznetzov, 1997)
- Fibuloides thysanota (Meyrick, 1912)
- Fibuloides trapezoidea Zhang & Li, 2011
- Fibuloides wuyiensis (Zhang & Li, 2005)

== See also ==
- List of Tortricidae genera
