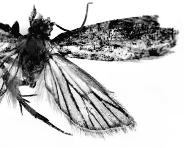

Scientific classification
- Kingdom: Animalia
- Phylum: Arthropoda
- Class: Insecta
- Order: Lepidoptera
- Family: Tortricidae
- Genus: Fibuloides
- Species: F. corinthia

Binomial name
- Fibuloides corinthia (Meyrick, 1912)

Synonyms
- Acroclita corinthia Meyrick, 1912; Acroclita nigrovenana Kuznetsov, 1988; Fibuloides nigrovenana (Kuznetsov, 1988)

= Fibuloides corinthia =

Species of moth

Fibuloides corinthia is a moth of the family Tortricidae. It is known from China (Yunnan), Taiwan, Sri Lanka and India.

The larvae feed on Litchi chinensis.
