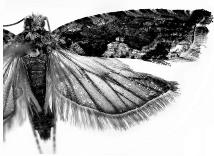

Scientific classification
- Kingdom: Animalia
- Phylum: Arthropoda
- Class: Insecta
- Order: Lepidoptera
- Family: Tortricidae
- Genus: Fibuloides
- Species: F. cyanopsis

Binomial name
- Fibuloides cyanopsis (Meyrick, 1912)

Synonyms
- Eucosoma cyanopsis Meyrick, 1912; Eucoenogenes cyanopsis; Eucosma melanochlaena Meyrick, 1936

= Fibuloides cyanopsis =

Species of moth

Fibuloides cyanopsis is a moth of the family Tortricidae. It is known from China (Guangdong, Guangxi, Guizhou), Japan, Vietnam, Indonesia and India.
