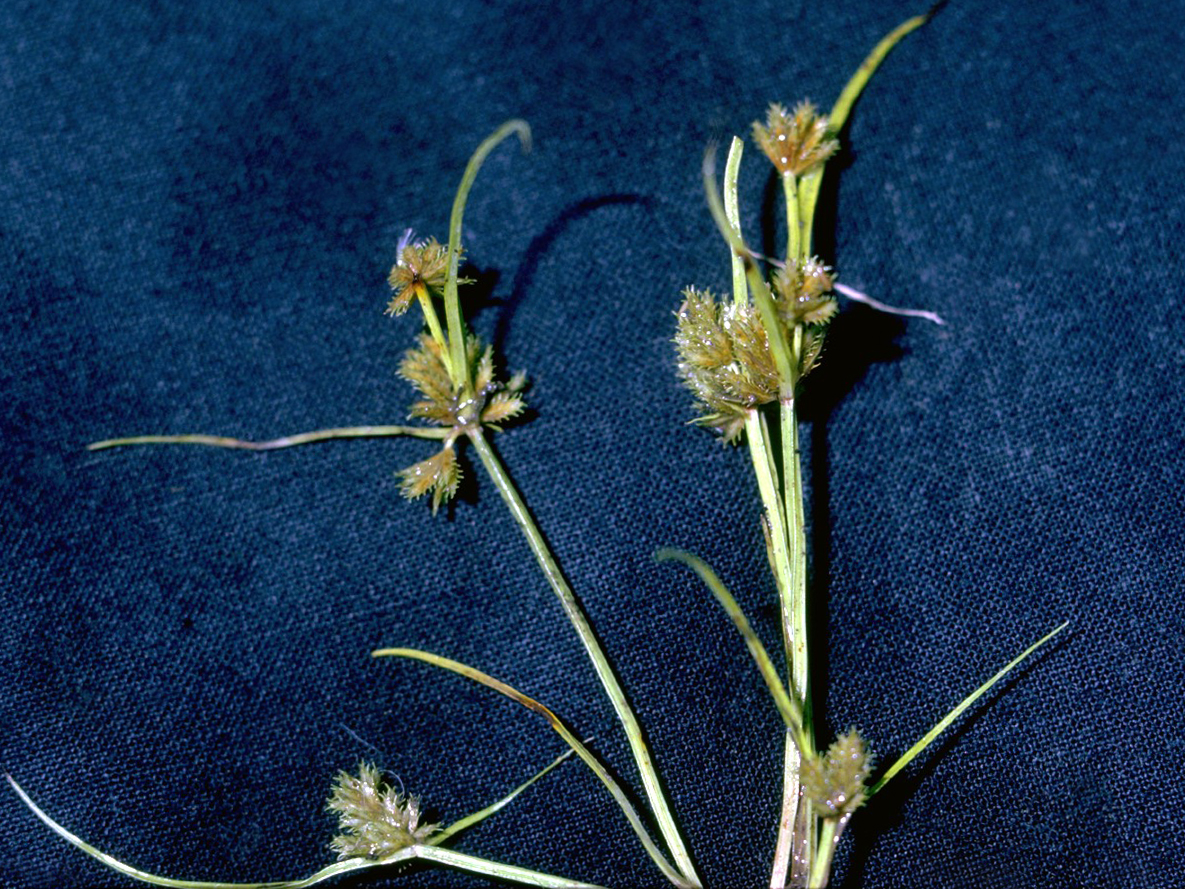

Conservation status
- Least Concern (IUCN 3.1)

Scientific classification
- Kingdom: Plantae
- Clade: Tracheophytes
- Clade: Angiosperms
- Clade: Monocots
- Clade: Commelinids
- Order: Poales
- Family: Cyperaceae
- Genus: Cyperus
- Species: C. squarrosus

Binomial name
- Cyperus squarrosus L.

Synonyms
- Cyperus aristatus Torrb.; Cyperus inflexus Muhl.; and many others

= Cyperus squarrosus =

Bearded flatsedge

Species of sedge

Cyperus squarrosus is a species of sedge known by several common names, including bearded flatsedge and awned flatsedge. It is found in wet environments in North and South America, Africa, Australia, southern Asia (China, India, Saudi Arabia, Indochina, etc.) and Italy.

== Description ==
Cyperus squarrosus is a small sedge, reaching a maximum height between 10–16 cm (3.9–6.3 in). There are one to three short, thin leaves around the base of the plant. The inflorescence is a single spherical or bunched spike of up to 30 spikelets. Each spikelet is flat and has excurved awns, meaning the tip of each of the two to eight flowers on the spikelet curls outward. The spikelets are bright green to yellowish or brown. The curved awn tips and the small size of this sedge are good identifying characteristics.
