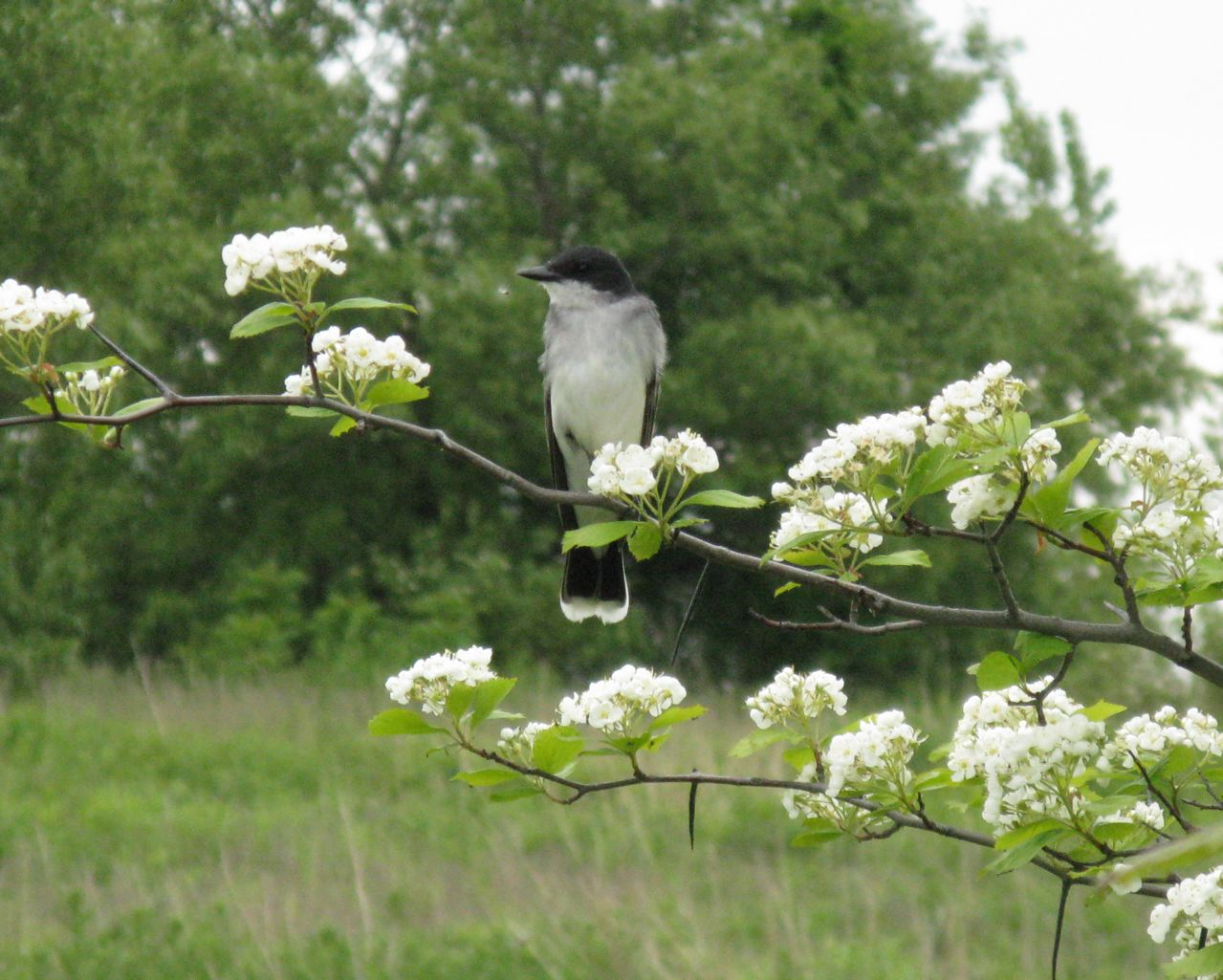

Scientific classification
- Kingdom: Plantae
- Clade: Tracheophytes
- Clade: Angiosperms
- Clade: Eudicots
- Clade: Rosids
- Order: Rosales
- Family: Rosaceae
- Genus: Crataegus
- Species: C. macracantha

Binomial name
- Crataegus macracantha Lodd. ex Loudon

Synonyms
- List: Crataegus beckiana Sarg.; Crataegus douglasii Macoun; Crataegus ferentaria Sarg.; Crataegus macracantha var. minor Loudon; Crataegus microsperma Sarg.; Crataegus ogdensburgensis Sarg.; Mespilus macracantha (Lodd. ex Loudon) Wenz.

= Crataegus macracantha =

Species of hawthorn

Crataegus macracantha, commonly called large-thorn hawthorn and aubépine á épines longues, is a woody flowering plant native to North America. It is the most widespread North American hawthorn, and highly variable, so it has often been split into other species.

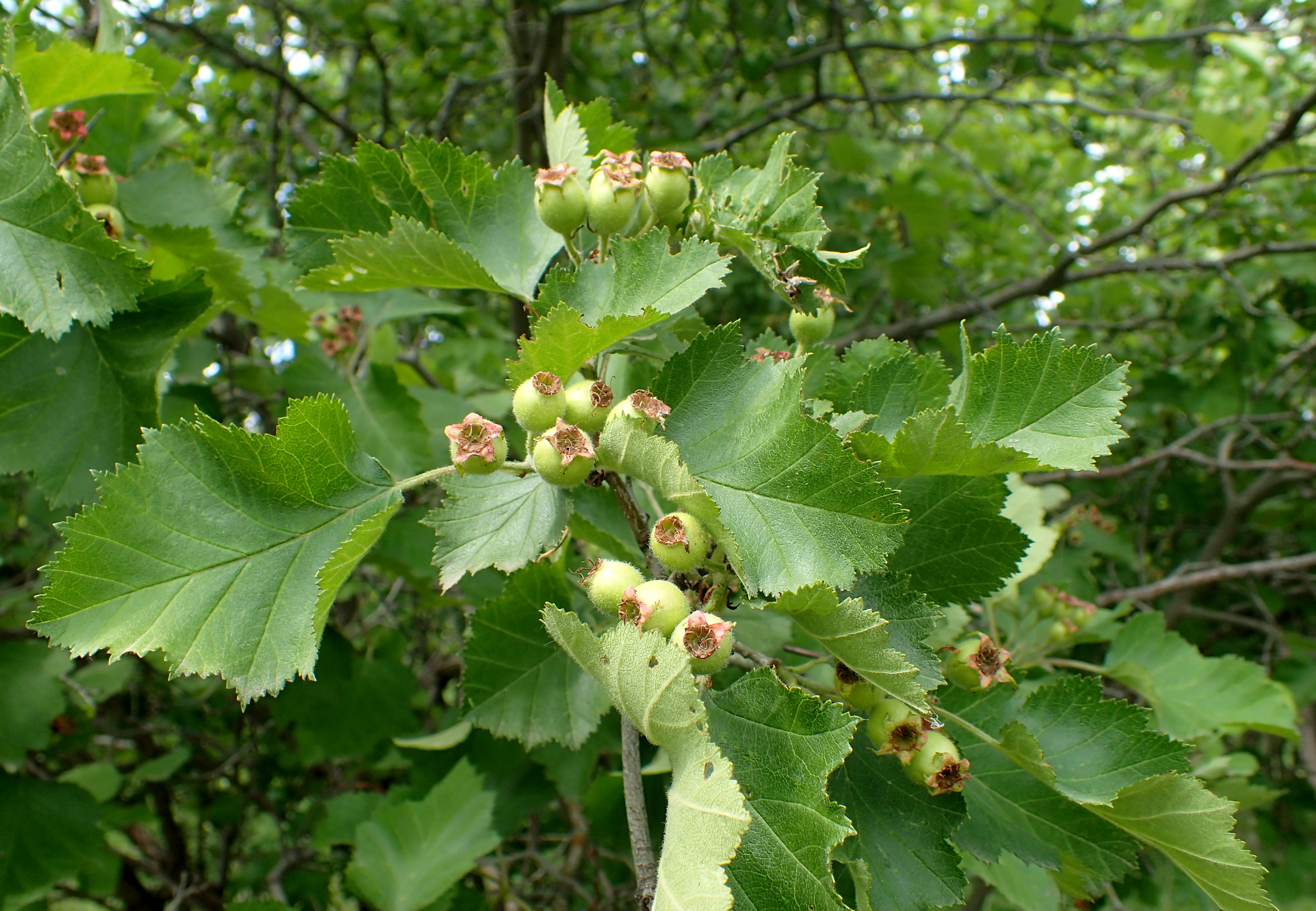
Crataegus macracantha
