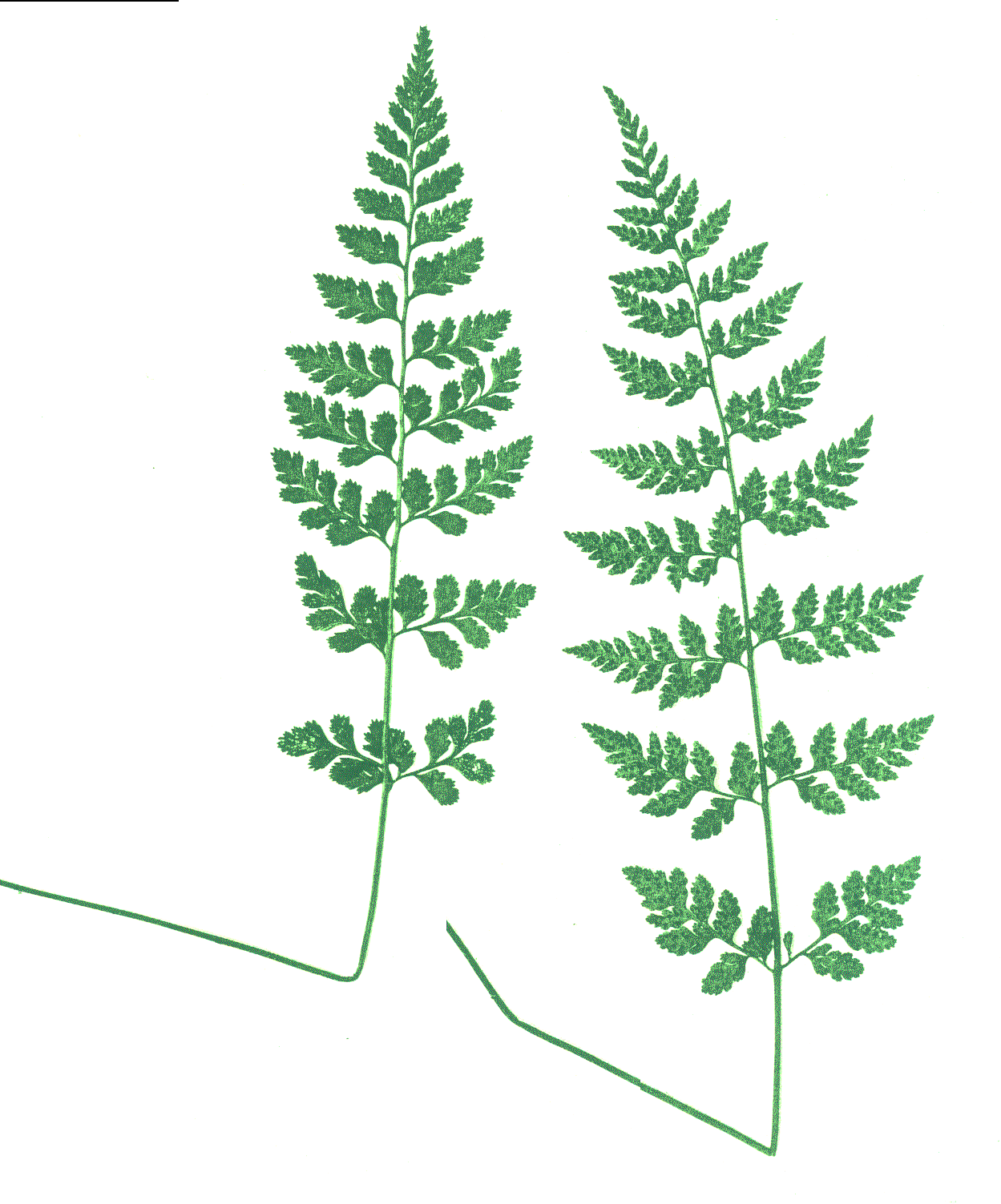
- Cystopteris protrusa fronds

Conservation status
- Secure (NatureServe)

Scientific classification
- Kingdom: Plantae
- Clade: Tracheophytes
- Division: Polypodiophyta
- Class: Polypodiopsida
- Order: Polypodiales
- Suborder: Aspleniineae
- Family: Cystopteridaceae
- Genus: Cystopteris
- Species: C. protrusa

Binomial name
- Cystopteris protrusa (Weatherby) Blasdell

= Cystopteris protrusa =

Species of fern

Cystopteris protrusa is a common fern of North America, commonly known as the lowland bladderfern, lowland brittle fern or lowland fragile fern.

The plant is native to eastern Canada, and the Midwestern and Eastern United States. Throughout much of its range it is the most common Cystopteris fern species.

== Description ==
Unlike most species of the genus Cystopteris, this fern is exclusively terrestrial, often forming large, dense colonies. It is also largely a spring ephemeral. Some fronds may remain by late summer, but most have disappeared.

The specific name, protrusa, refers to the fact that the rhizome protrudes a short distance beyond the current year's fronds to form the following year's leaf buds. This protrusion is a positive diagnostic in the field. Sori are round and covered in a bladder-like indusium.

=== Taxonomy ===
Cystopteris protrusa was originally considered only a variety of Cystopteris fragilis. However, it is now known that this is a diploid species, while C. fragilis (ss) is a polyploid species of hybrid origin. C. protrusa is a parent of the hybrid species Cystopteris tennesseensis and Cystopteris tenuis.

== See also ==
- Cystopteris hybrid complex
