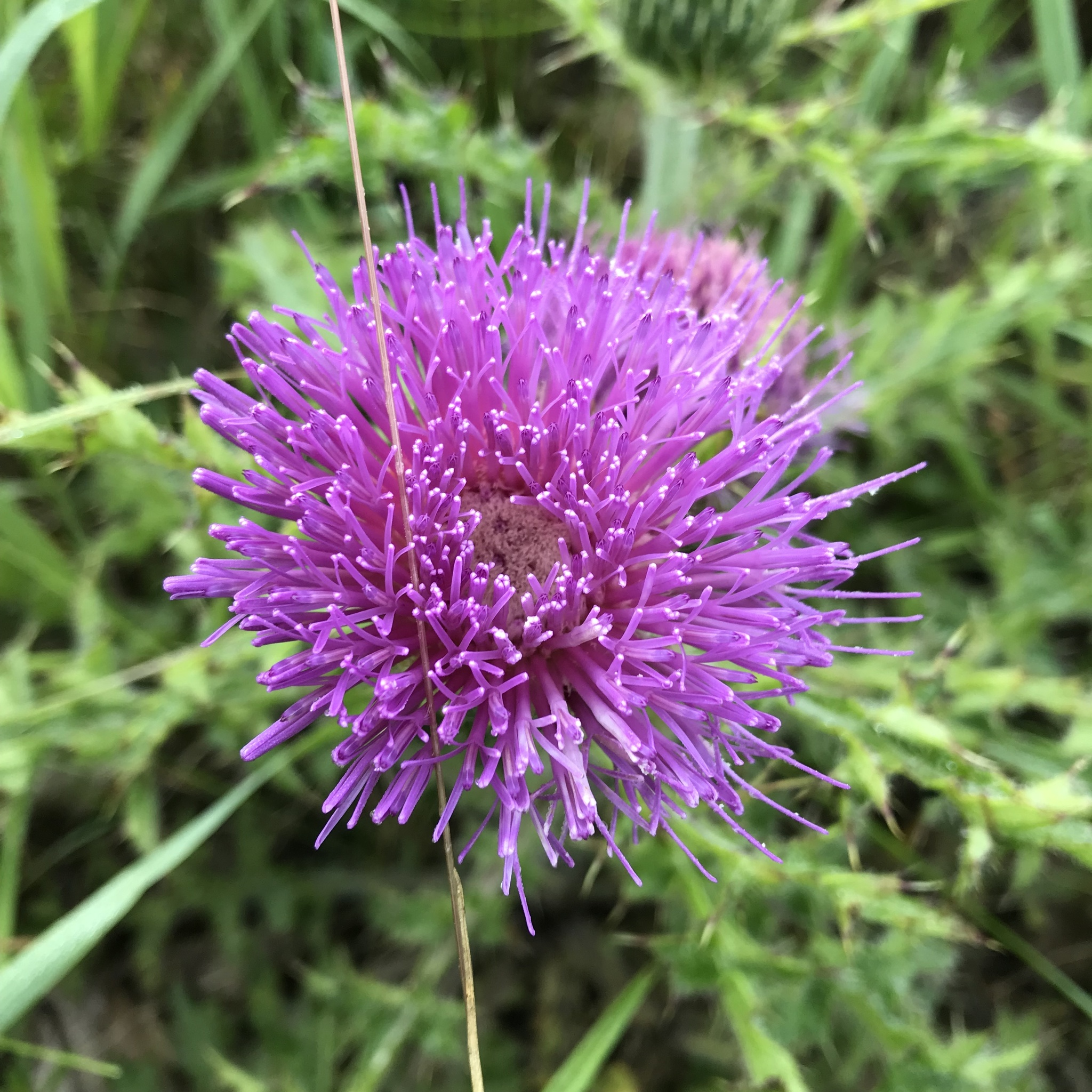

Scientific classification
- Kingdom: Plantae
- Clade: Embryophytes
- Clade: Tracheophytes
- Clade: Spermatophytes
- Clade: Angiosperms
- Clade: Eudicots
- Clade: Asterids
- Order: Asterales
- Family: Asteraceae
- Genus: Cirsium
- Species: C. pumilum
- Variety: C. p. var. hillii

Trinomial name
- Cirsium pumilum var. hillii (Canby) B. Boivin

Synonyms
- Cirsium hillii (Canby) Fernald; Cirsium pumilum subsp. hillii (Canby) R.J.Moore & Frankton; Cnicus hillii Canby

= Cirsium pumilum var. hillii =

Hill's thistle

Species of thistle

Cirsium pumilum var. hillii is a type of thistle endemic to North America. The common name for this plant is Hill's thistle.

== Description ==
Hill's thistle is a low-growing thistle usually reaching 25 to 60 cm (10 to 23.5 in) in height, with a taproot system that runs deep into the ground. It is a perennial plant usually living for three years, and flowers in July and August. The plant's leaves are an elliptic-oblong shape with serrated edges, have tiny prickles, and have one central vein with smaller veins branching from it.

The top of the stem holds a composite flower head, each consisting of many individual disc florets but no ray florets. The flowers of this plant are usually purple though sometimes pink or white. Hill's thistle tends to looks very similar to Cirsium vulgare during its seedling and rosette stages; one can easily be mistaken for the other.

== Habitat ==
Hill's thistle thrives in areas that are open, sandy, and dry. It also grows well in areas that are susceptible to fire and areas lacking tall vegetation. Its preferred habitats include sand prairies, sand dunes, open wooded areas, and limestone plains with thin soil and little vegetation. Natural fires are important for Hill's thistle because they burn large trees and debris, which reduces competition and allows it to grow.

== Range ==
Hill's thistle is an endemic species to North America, found only in Canada and the United States. It is found around the Great Lakes, in the southern part of Ontario, as well as Michigan, Wisconsin, Minnesota, Iowa, Illinois and Indiana.

== Importance to humans and the ecosystem ==
Hill's thistle is not used for medicine, food, or fibres. This lack of utility may be beneficial to its persistence in the wild, as it has been suggested that samples only be collected for scientific reasons. It does, however, play an important role in its ecosystem because it is consumed by whitetail deer. Multiple plants grow near Hill's thistle, such as big and little bluestem, blazing star, rough fescue, pale agoseris, juniper, hair grass, western sunflower, and field chickenweed. Because Hill's thistle is one of the first plants to colonize its habitat, perhaps it plays a role in stabilizing the soil and benefits these other plants.

== Conservation ==
The Committee of the Status of Endangered Wildlife in Canada last examined Hill's thistle in 2004 and named it as "threatened" due to its "rarity, restricted range, and human factors, which make it susceptible to extinction,". The plant's main threats include aggregate demand, shoreline development, and invasive species. Human recreation and development encroachment may also negatively impact Hill's thistle.

Hill's thistle generally only lives to be 2 or 3 years old, typically flowering at 3 years. This could pose a problem in terms of conservation because, if fewer plants survive to the flowering stage at the end of their life, there will be less production of offspring.

Lack of disturbance by natural fires is another reason why Hill's thistle is threatened. This plant needs an open, dry, grassy environment in order to thrive. Areas where it previously succeeded are now managed to prevent fires, allowing the invasion of shrubs and trees, which outcompete the open-habitat species.

Hill's thistle is a rare species found in relatively few places around the globe and thus ongoing conservation efforts are essential for its survival. Suggestions for the conservation of this species include reducing shoreline development and aggregate demand in its habitat. Conservation efforts should also focus determining how management of fires affects seedling establishment and what can be done in regards to fire reduction.
