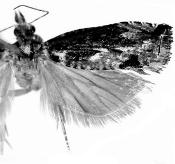

Scientific classification
- Kingdom: Animalia
- Phylum: Arthropoda
- Class: Insecta
- Order: Lepidoptera
- Family: Tortricidae
- Genus: Fibuloides
- Species: F. aestuosa

Binomial name
- Fibuloides aestuosa (Meyrick, 1912)

Synonyms
- Spilonota aestuosa Meyrick 1912; Eucoenogenes aestuosa; Acroclita ligyropis Meyrick, 1937

= Fibuloides aestuosa =

Species of moth

Fibuloides aestuosa, the greenish chestnut moth, is a moth of the family Tortricidae. It is known from China (Anhui, Henan, Hubei, Guangxi, Liaoning, Sichuan, Yunnan, Zhejiang), Korea, Japan, northern India and Bengal.

The wingspan is 17–21 mm. On Hokkaido island in Japan there is one generation per year, in the south of Japan there are more generations.

The larvae feed on Castanea mollissima and Castanea cranata. They are considered a pest on Castanea crenata. The larvae bore into the nuts.
