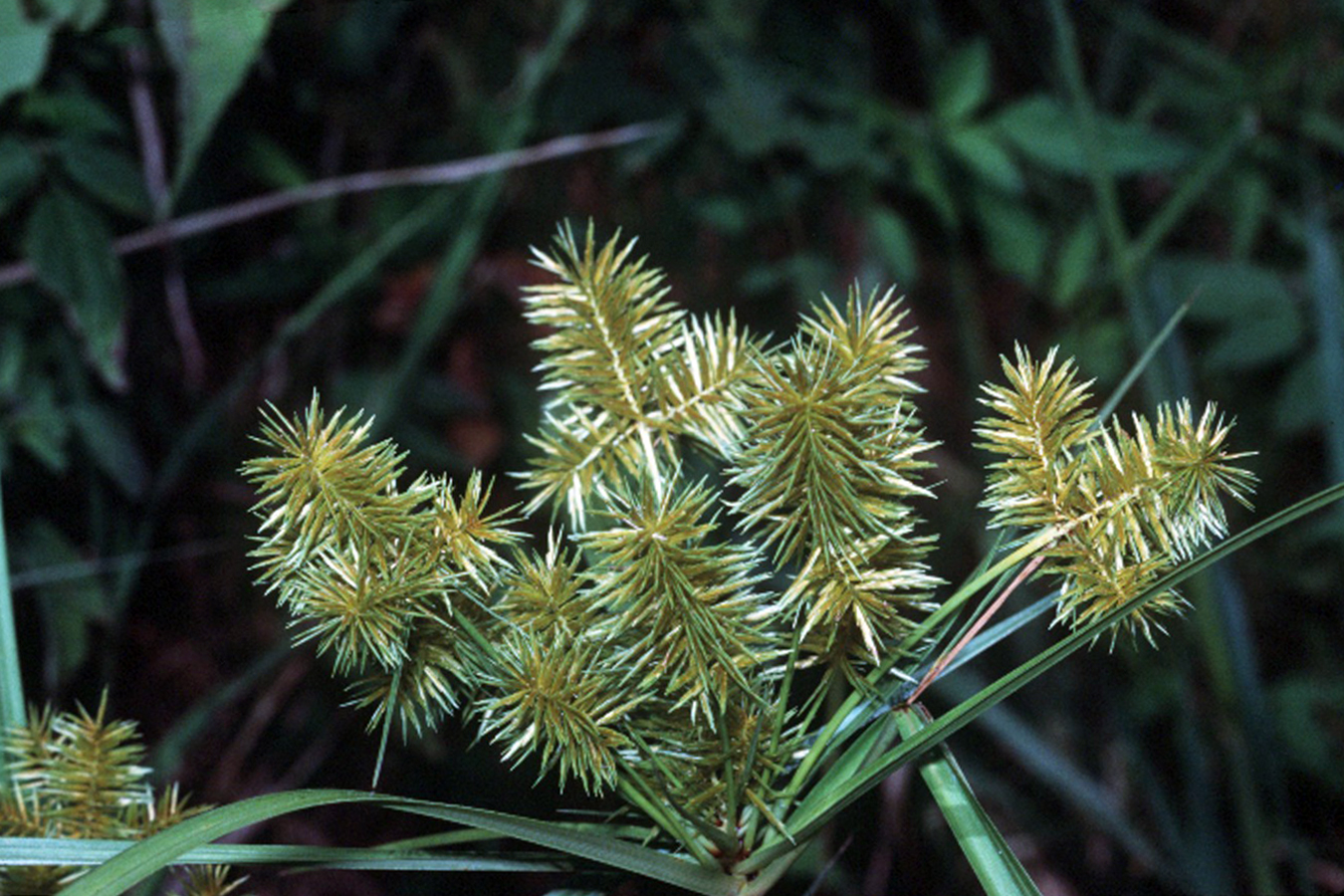

Scientific classification
- Kingdom: Plantae
- Clade: Tracheophytes
- Clade: Angiosperms
- Clade: Monocots
- Clade: Commelinids
- Order: Poales
- Family: Cyperaceae
- Genus: Cyperus
- Species: C. strigosus

Binomial name
- Cyperus strigosus L.

Synonyms
- Cyperus hansenii Britton; Cyperus stenolepis Torr.; Mariscus strigosus (L.) C.B.Clarke; Cyperus distans Pursh; Cyperus enslenii Pursh; Cyperus praelongatus Steud.; Mariscus praelongatus (Steud.) C.B.Clarke; Mariscus stenolepis (Torr.) C.B.Clarke; Cyperus naguensis Britton

= Cyperus strigosus =

False nutsedge

Species of plant

Cyperus strigosus is a species of sedge known by the common names false nutsedge and straw-colored flatsedge. It is native to the United States, Cuba and Canada, where it grows in wet areas in many habitat types, including disturbed and cultivated areas such as roadsides and crop fields. It is common and sometimes weedy. It is a perennial sedge growing up to 70 cm (28 in) tall. The inflorescence is a cluster of many linear-shaped spikelets up to 3 cm (1.2 in) long each. A few long, leaf-like bracts grow at the base of the spike.

Introduced populations occur in Bulgaria, France, Italy, Spain and Bangladesh.

== See also ==
- List of Cyperus species
