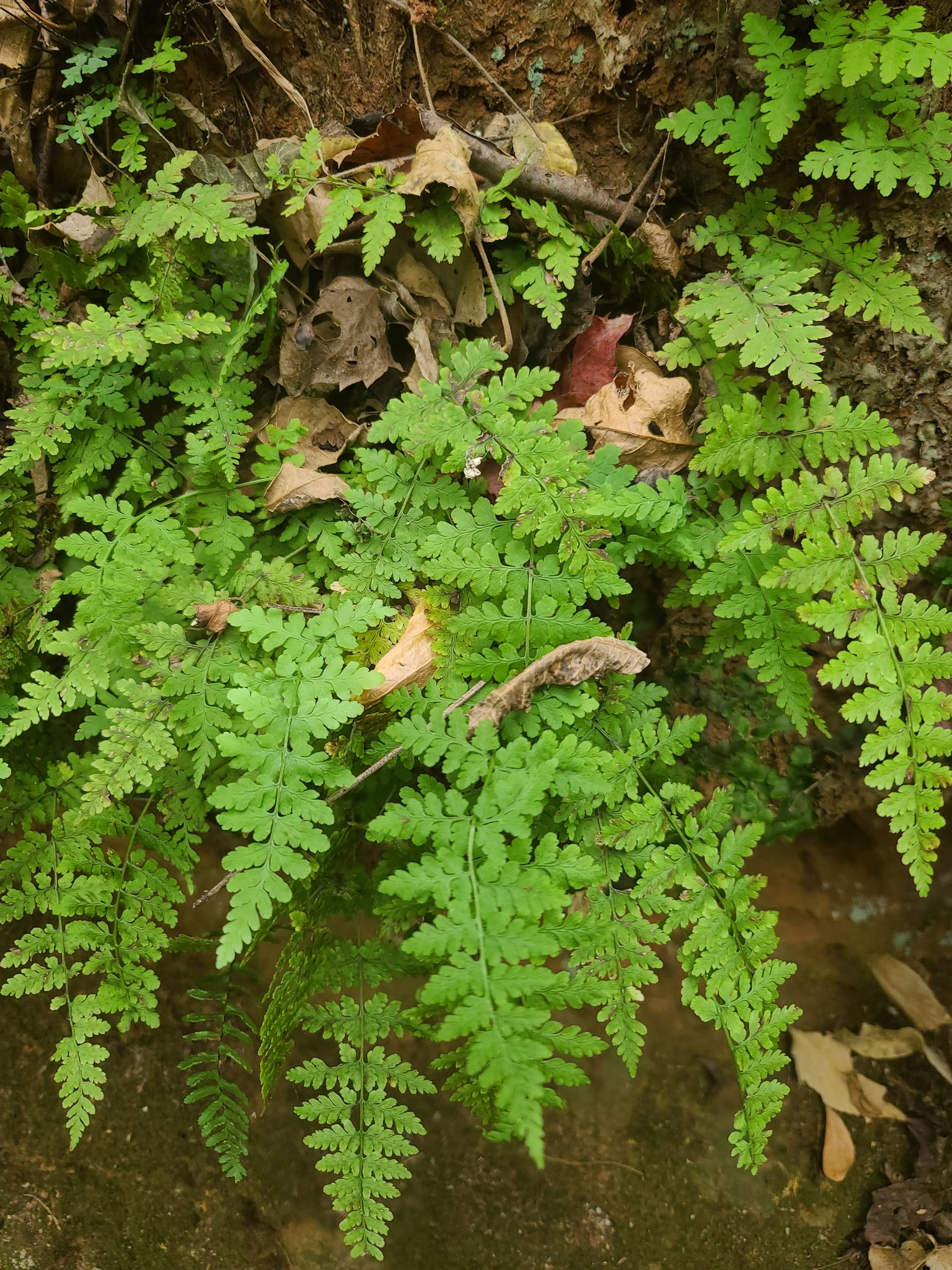

Scientific classification
- Kingdom: Plantae
- Clade: Tracheophytes
- Division: Polypodiophyta
- Class: Polypodiopsida
- Order: Polypodiales
- Suborder: Aspleniineae
- Family: Cystopteridaceae
- Genus: Cystopteris
- Species: C. tennesseensis

Binomial name
- Cystopteris tennesseensis Shaver

Synonyms
- Cystopteris fragilis var. tennesseensis (Shaver) McGregor; Cystopteris fragilis (Linnaeus) Bernhardi f. simulans Weatherby

= Cystopteris tennesseensis =

Species of plant

Cystopteris tennesseensis, commonly known as the Tennessee fragile fern or Tennessee bladderfern, is a species of fern in the family Cystopteridaceae.

== Description ==
Cystopteris tennesseensis is a lithophytic fern, growing on calcareous rock ledges, scree, and cliffs. It has creeping rhizomes, and occasionally has misshapen bulbets.

Cystopteris tennesseensis is a member of the Cystopteris hybrid complex. It originated as an allotetraploid hybrid between two diploid parents, C. bulbifera × C. protrusa.

== Distribution ==
The fern is native to the eastern United States. It occurs in the states of: Ala., Ark., Ga., Ill., Ind., Iowa, Kans., Ky., Md., Mo., N.C., Ohio., Okla., Pa., Tenn., Va., W.Va., Wis.
