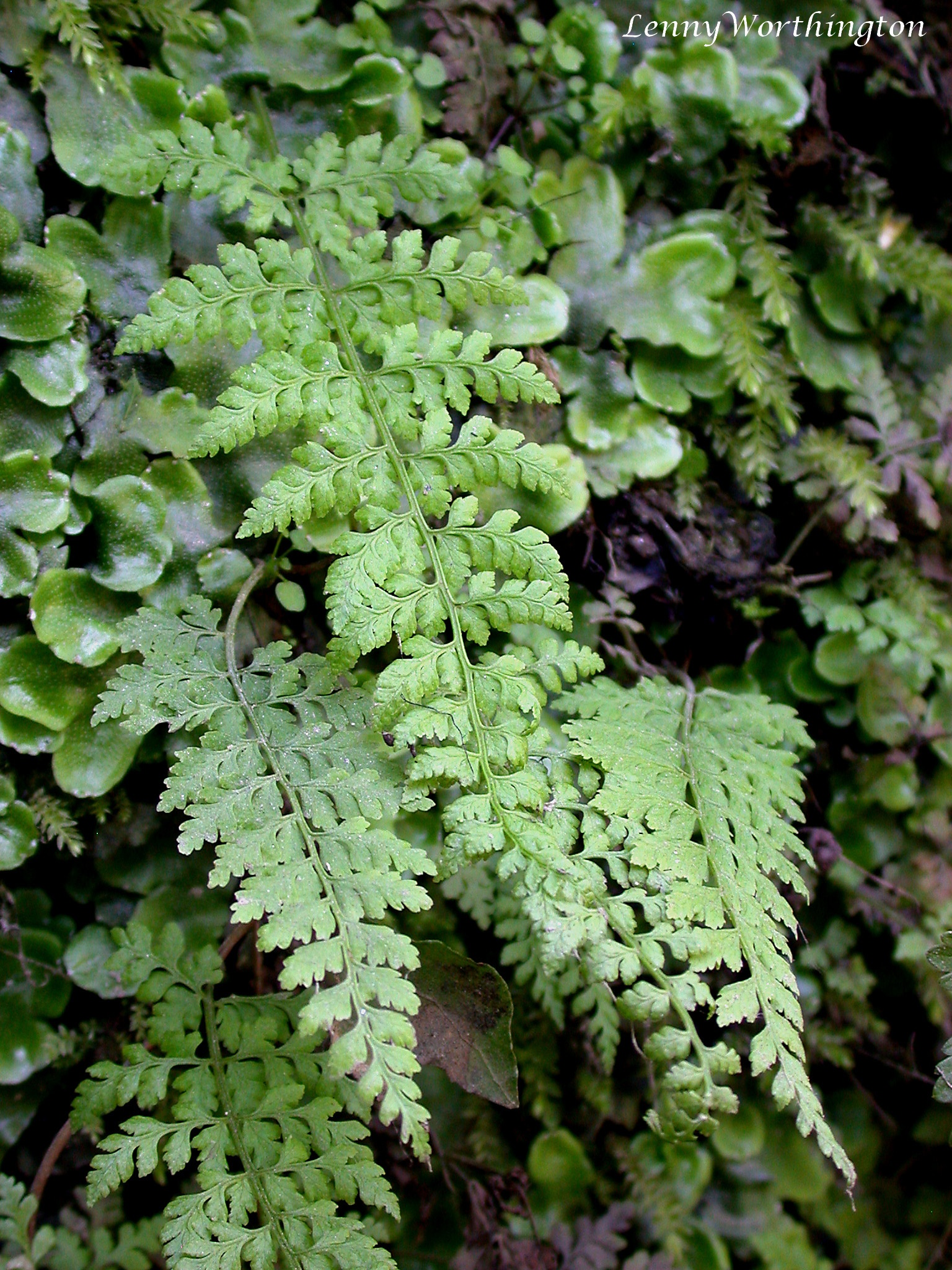
- In Cornwall, England

Scientific classification
- Kingdom: Plantae
- Clade: Tracheophytes
- Division: Polypodiophyta
- Class: Polypodiopsida
- Order: Polypodiales
- Suborder: Aspleniineae
- Family: Cystopteridaceae
- Genus: Cystopteris
- Species: C. diaphana

Binomial name
- Cystopteris diaphana (Bory) Blasdell

= Cystopteris diaphana =

Species of fern

Cystopteris diaphana, the greenish bladder-fern or diaphanous bladder-fern, is a fern in the family Cystopteridaceae.

== Distribution ==
It is found locally on the Atlantic seaboard of Europe.

=== Status in Britain ===
The species was found for the first time in Britain in February 2000 on the banks of the River Camel in Cornwall (Murphy & Rumsey, 2005).
