= Johann Jakob Bernhardi =

German physician and botanist (1774–1850)

Johann Jakob Bernhardi (1 September 1774, in Erfurt – 13 May 1850, in Erfurt) was a German medical doctor and botanist.

== Biography ==
Johann J. Bernhardi studied Medicine and Botany at the University of Erfurt, and after graduation practiced medicine for a time in his native city. In 1799 he was named director of the botanical garden at Gartenstraße, and in 1809 was appointed professor of botany, zoology, mineralogy and materia medica at the university. He served as director of the botanical garden until his death in 1850, being buried in the central avenue of this botanical garden.

Throughout his life thanks to acquisitions and interchanges with other botanists, he assembled a considerable herbarium of 60,000 plants with specimens from North America, South America, Asia, and Africa. After his death this herbarium did not remain in Germany but due to the efforts of George Engelmann, who, in 1857, shortly after the death of Bernhardi bought the complete herbarium for the amount of 600 dollars for Henry Shaw, founder of the Botanical Garden of Missouri in the U.S.A., forms the nucleus of the collection and the initial museum of this Botanical Garden (at the moment the "Missouri Botanical Garden herbarium" contains over 6.2 million specimens and the library over 120,000 volumes).

Johann J. Bernhardi studied and described several species of orchids, including Epipactis atrorubens. He described a species of rose without thorns, Rosa × francofurtana, found in the garden of the house of Johann Wolfgang von Goethe in Weimar. The genus Bernhardia (family Psilotaceae) is named in his honor.

He was editor of the Thüringischen Gartenzeitung (Thuringian garden newspaper) and the Allgemeinen deutschen Gartenmagazin (General German garden magazine). The thoroughfare, Jacob-Bernhardi-Straße in Erfurt, is named in his honor.

== Works ==
- Catalogus plantarum horti Erfurtensis, 1799.
- Systematisches Verzeichnis der Pflanzen, welche in der Gegend um Erfurt gefunden werden, 1800 - Systematic catalog of plants that are found in the vicinity of Erfurt.
- Anleitung zu Kenntnis der Pflanzen, 1804 - Botanical instruction manual.
- Beobachtungen über Pflanzengefäße, 1805 - Observations involving planters.
- Ueber den Begriff der Pflanzenart und seine Anwendung, 1835 - On the concept of "species" and its application.
