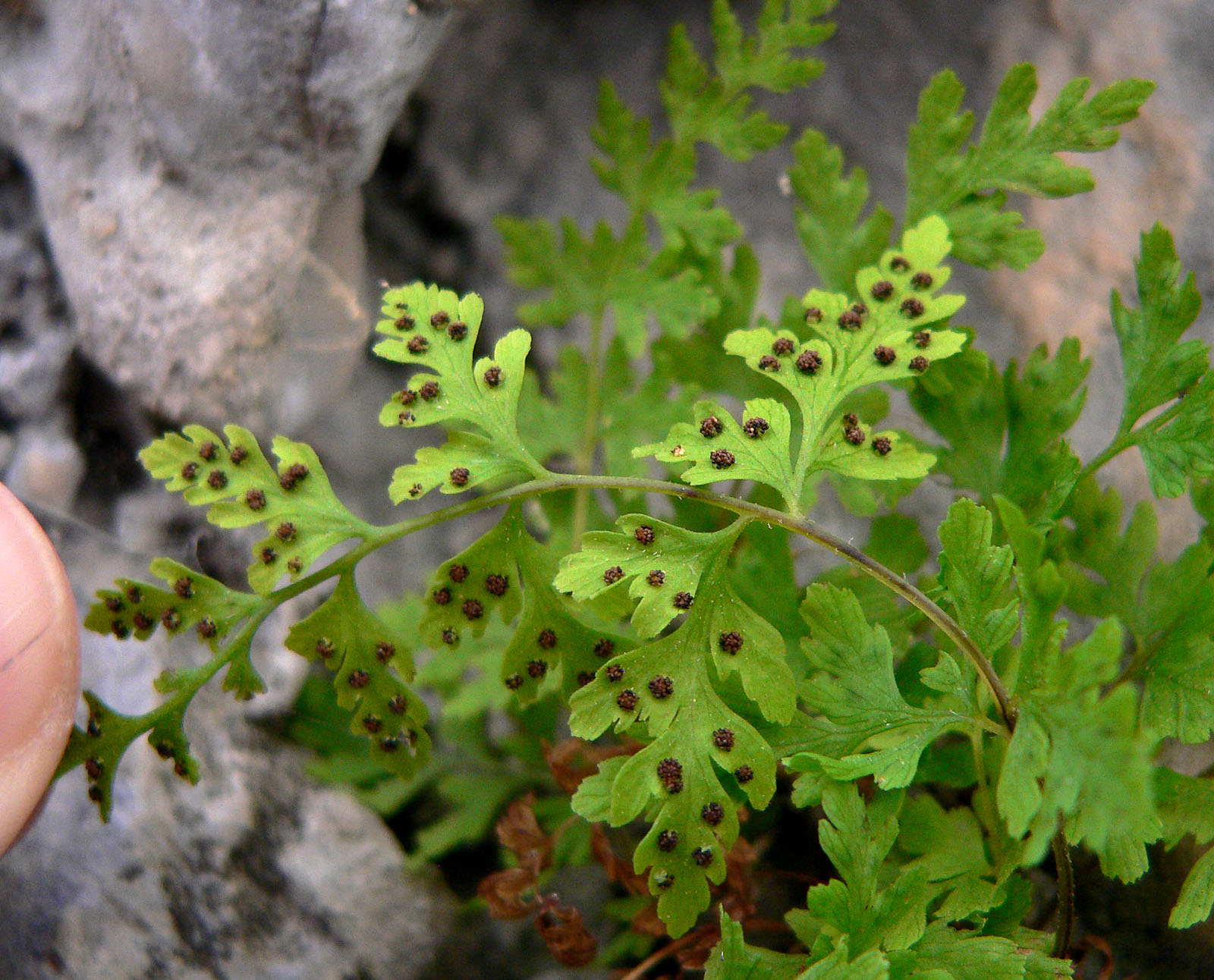
- Sori

Conservation status
- Least Concern (IUCN 3.1)

- Secure (NatureServe)

Scientific classification
- Kingdom: Plantae
- Clade: Embryophytes
- Clade: Tracheophytes
- Division: Polypodiophyta
- Class: Polypodiopsida
- Order: Polypodiales
- Suborder: Aspleniineae
- Family: Cystopteridaceae
- Genus: Cystopteris
- Species: C. fragilis

Binomial name
- Cystopteris fragilis (L.) Bernh.

Synonyms
- Filix fragilis (L.) Underw.

= Cystopteris fragilis =

Species of fern

Cystopteris fragilis is a species of perennial fern known by the common names brittle bladder-fern and common fragile fern. It can be found worldwide, generally in shady, moist areas.

== Description ==
It has a short, black rootstock. The leaves are up to 5–25 cm (2.0–9.8 in) and are borne on fleshy petioles with few or no long hairs. The petioles are about half the length of the leaf blade. Each leaf is divided into many pairs of leaflets, each of which is subdivided into lobed segments. The leaflets are narrowly triangular and apiculate. The underside of the leaf has many rounded sori containing the sporangia. A young Cystopteris fragilis is said to have the scent of bitter almond, which is caused by spores that contain hydrogen cyanide.

== Habitat ==
The plant, native to for example Finland, grows in places fit for its brittle structure: usually shady and slightly moist areas, in the cracks and ledges of vertical rock faces, blockfields and sometimes on even cliff surfaces as well. It avoids the more most acidic and barren cliffs and prefers especially slightly lime rich soil.

== Gallery ==
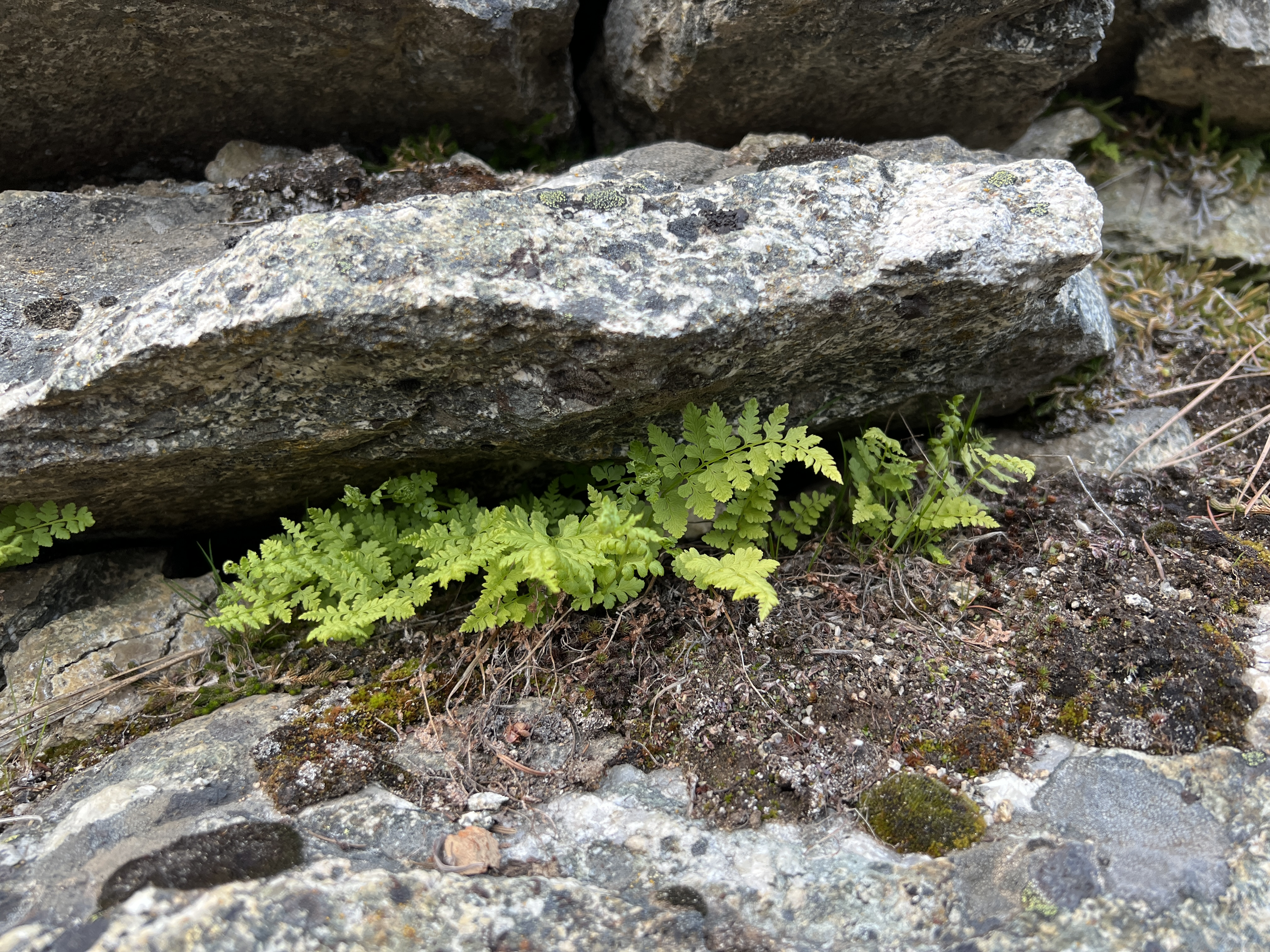
Icicle Creek, WA

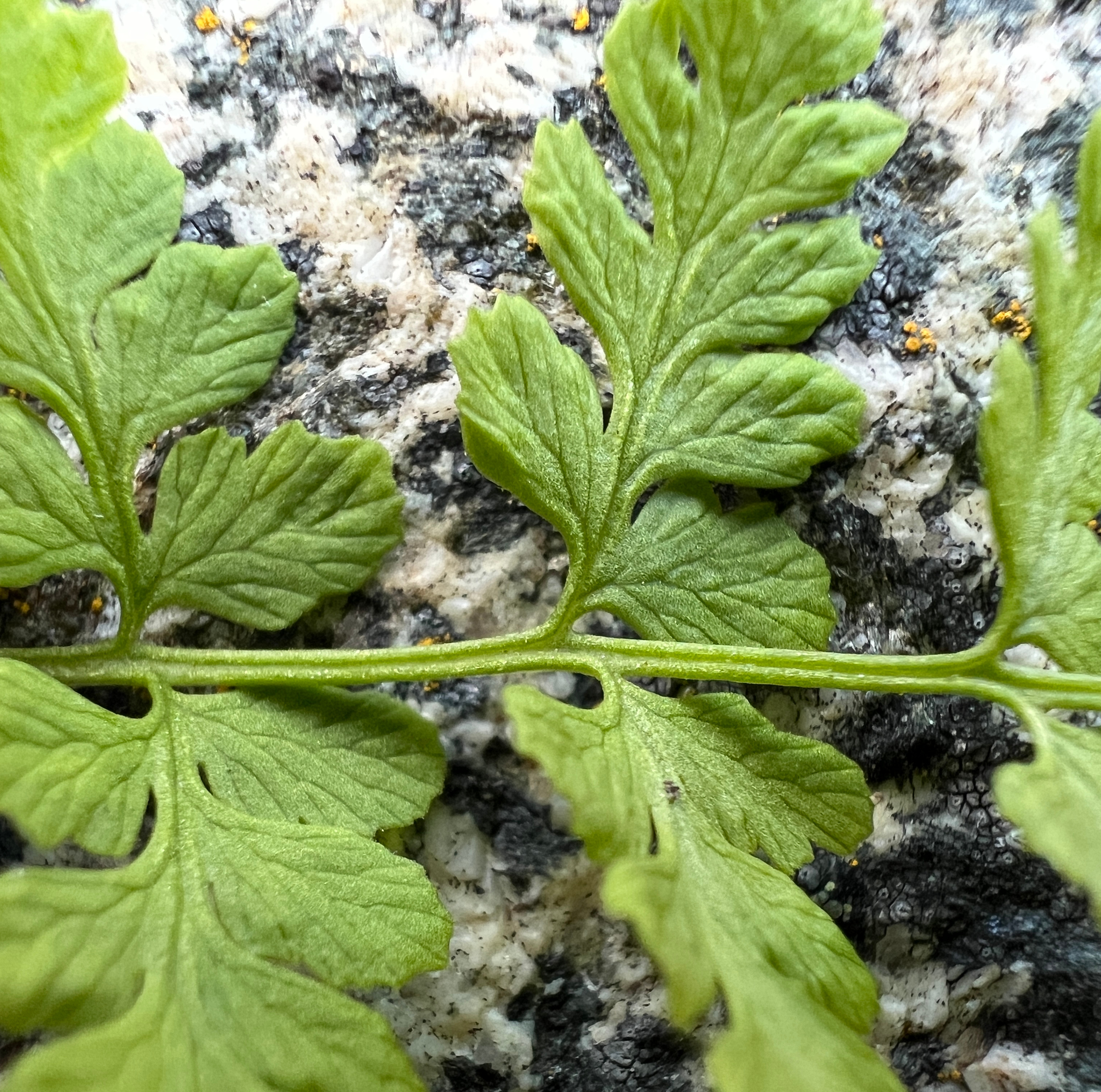
Adaxial leaf

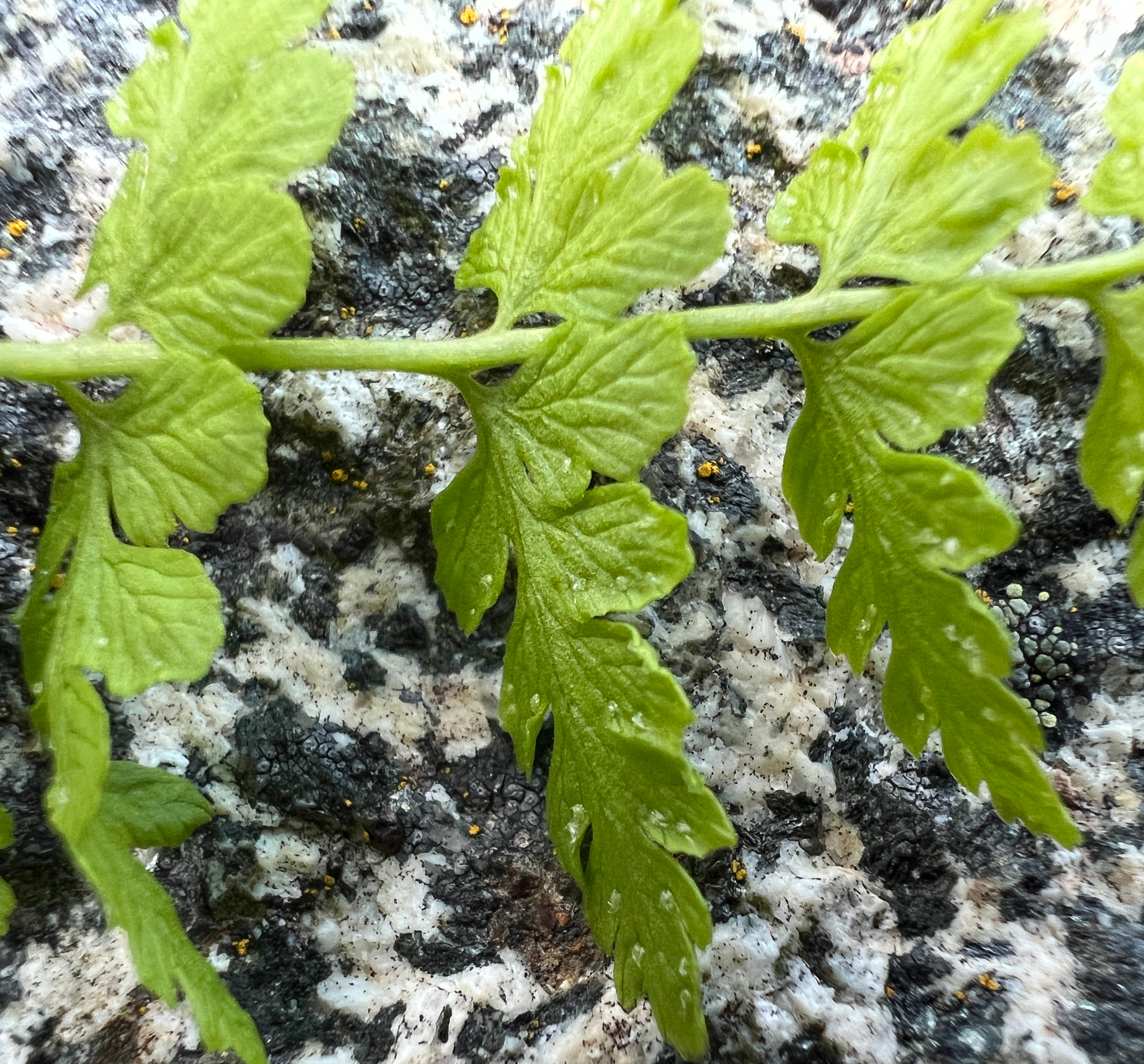
Abaxial leaf
