= Col de Porte =

Mountain pass in France

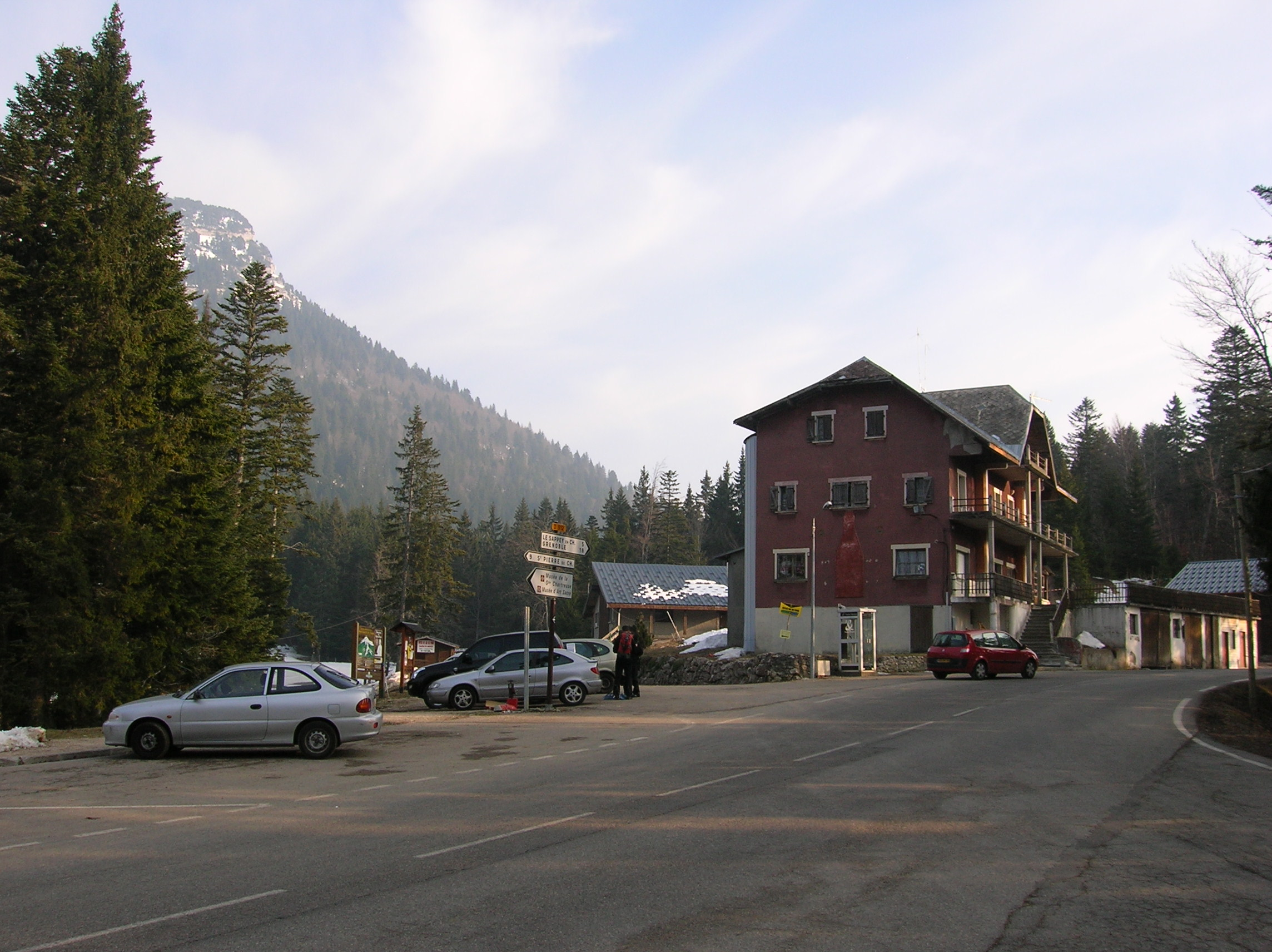
- The col seen from the north

- Location within Alps
- Elevation: 1,326 metres (4,350 ft)
- Traversed by: D512

Third Approach
- Location: Isère, Rhône-Alpes, France
- Range: Chartreuse Mountains
- Coordinates: 45°17′24″N 5°46′01″E

The Col de Porte (elevation 1,326 m (4,350 ft)) is a mountain pass situated in the Chartreuse Mountains in the Isère department of France, between Le Sappey-en-Chartreuse to the south and Saint-Pierre-de-Chartreuse to the north. It sits on the D512 between Grenoble and Chambéry, and prior to 1998 was often crossed in conjunction with the Col du Cucheron and the Col du Granier.

To the east is Chamechaude, the highest summit in the Chartreuse Massif. There is a small ski resort situated near the col.

== Cycle racing ==
The Col de Porte is regularly used in the Critérium du Dauphiné. In the sixth stage of the 1977 Critérium, Bernard Hinault fell on the descent from the Col de Porte leading to Grenoble when he was alone in the lead, 1'40" ahead of his competitors. Despite the fall, he won the stage at Bastille in Grenoble ahead of Lucien Van Impe and Bernard Thévenet.

=== Details of the climb ===
From Grenoble, to the south, the climb via the D512 is 17.7 km (11.0 mi) long, gaining 1,116 m (3,661 ft) in altitude, at an average gradient of 6.3%, with the steepest section being at 10%. 2.5 km (1.6 mi) from the summit, it passes the Col de Palaquit (1,154 m (3,786 ft)).

=== Tour de France ===
The pass was first included in the Tour de France in 1907, after which it was used in the next three tours, and then not again until 1947.

=== Appearances in Tour de France since 1947 ===
Since 1947, the passages which have been categorized have been:

| Year | Stage | Category | Start | Finish | Leader at the summit |
|---|---|---|---|---|---|
| 2020 | 16 | 1 | La Tour-du-Pin | Villard-de-Lans | Pierre Rolland (FRA) |
| 1998 | 16 | 1 | Vizille | Albertville | Stéphane Heulot (FRA) |
| 1989 | 19 | 1 | Villard-de-Lans | Aix-les-Bains | Pedro Delgado (ESP) |
| 1978 | 17 | 1 | Grenoble | Morzine | André Romero (FRA) |
| 1971 | 10 | 1 | Saint-Etienne | Grenoble | Luis Ocaña (ESP) |
| 1970 | 12 | 1 | Thonon-les-Bains | Grenoble | Eddy Merckx (BEL) |
| 1968 | 18 | 1 | Saint-Etienne | Grenoble | Roger Pingeon (FRA) |
| 1965 | 17 | 1 | Briançon | Aix-les-Bains | Julio Jiménez (ESP) |
| 1963 | 15 | 1 | Saint-Etienne | Grenoble | Federico Bahamontes (ESP) |
| 1962 | 19 | 1 | Briançon | Aix-les-Bains | Raymond Poulidor (FRA) |
| 1961 | 9 | 2 | Saint-Etienne | Grenoble | Charly Gaul (LUX) |
| 1958 | 21 | 1 | Briançon | Aix-les-Bains | Charly Gaul (LUX) |
| 1951 | 21 | 1 | Briançon | Aix-les-Bains | Bernard Gauthier (FRA) |
| 1948 | 14 | 2 | Briançon | Aix-les-Bains | Gino Bartali (ITA) |
