= Saint-Pierre-d'Entremont =

Saint-Pierre-d'Entremont may refer to the following places in France:

- Saint-Pierre-d'Entremont, Isère, a commune in the Isère department
- Saint-Pierre-d'Entremont, Orne, a commune in the Orne department
- Saint-Pierre-d'Entremont, Savoie, a commune in the Savoie department
