= Réserve naturelle nationale des Hauts de Chartreuse =

National nature reserve in Rhône-Alpes, France

Coordinates: 45.3914°N 5.9006°E

The Réserve naturelle nationale des Hauts de Chartreuse (National nature reserve of the Hauts de Chartreuse) (RNN136) is a national nature reserve located in Rhône-Alpes in the Chartreuse Mountains. Classified in 1997, it covers 4,450 hectares and forms a vast rocky tray bordered by cliffs which has mountain and subalpine environments.

== Location ==
Situated at the east of the Chartreuse Mountains in Rhône-Alpes, the nature reserve stretches from Mont Granier north to the Dent de Crolles south located at about 20 km.

The territory concerns 11 communes (french townships) of 2 departments. In Isère, Sainte-Marie-du-Mont, Saint-Pancrasse, Chapareillan, Saint-Bernard-du-Touvet, Saint-Hilaire-du-Touvet, Saint-Pierre-de-Chartreuse et Saint-Pierre Entremont; in Savoie, Saint-Pierre-d'Entremont, Apremont, Les Marches and Entremont-le-Vieux.

The site forms a vast rocky tray in high elevation, bordered by high steep walls. It covers a total area of 4450 hectares, of which 3950 hectares in Isère and 500 ha in Savoie to an elevation situated between 900 m and 2062 m above sea level.
