= Sommet du Pinet =

Chartreuse mountain in France

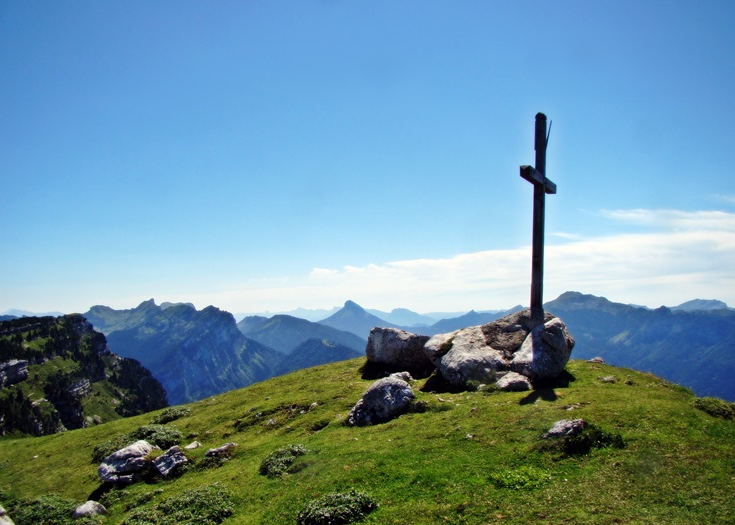
- Cross at the top, with the Lances de Malissard in the background

Highest point
- Elevation: 1,867 m (6,125 ft)
- Coordinates: 45°25′57″N 05°54′14″E

Geography
- Location within France
- Location: Savoie, France
- Parent range: Chartreuse Mountains

The Sommet du Pinet (or Le Pinet or Le Truc) is a Chartreuse mountain situated at the south of the mont Granier, culminating at 1,867 m above sea level.

Located between the townships of Entremont-le-Vieux, Saint-Pierre-d'Entremont in Savoie and Sainte-Marie-du-Mont, its ridge marks the border between Isère and Savoie.

== Ascension ==
A departure for an hike is located at Saint-Pierre-d'Entremont in Savoie

== Caving ==
Under the summit of the Pinet there is an important underground network, the Pinet - Brouillard system of 11,175 meters of development for 507 meters deep. This system is not connected to the Alpe network, although nearby. Nearby opens the grand Glacier network of 371 m of elevation gain for a length of 2,926 meters well known for its ice river.
