= Tour Percée =

Largest freestanding natural arch in the Alps

Coordinates: 45°22′10″N 5°54′17″E

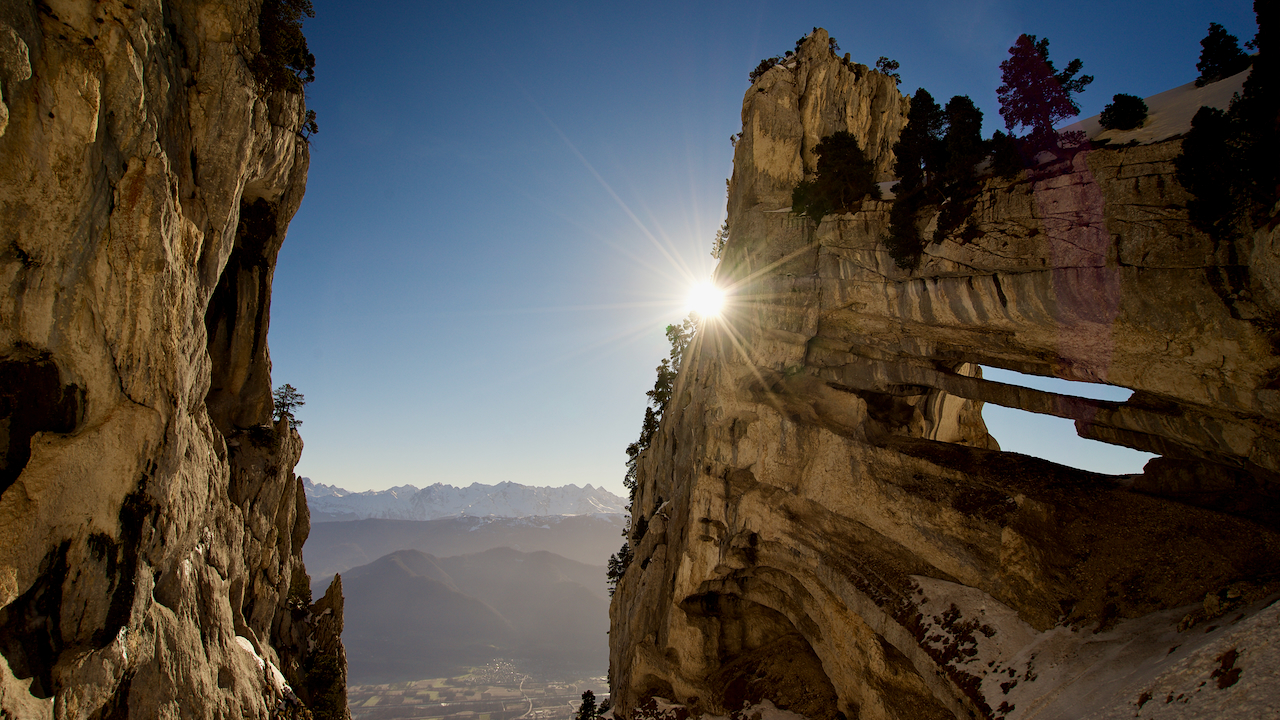
Tour Isabelle, February 2021

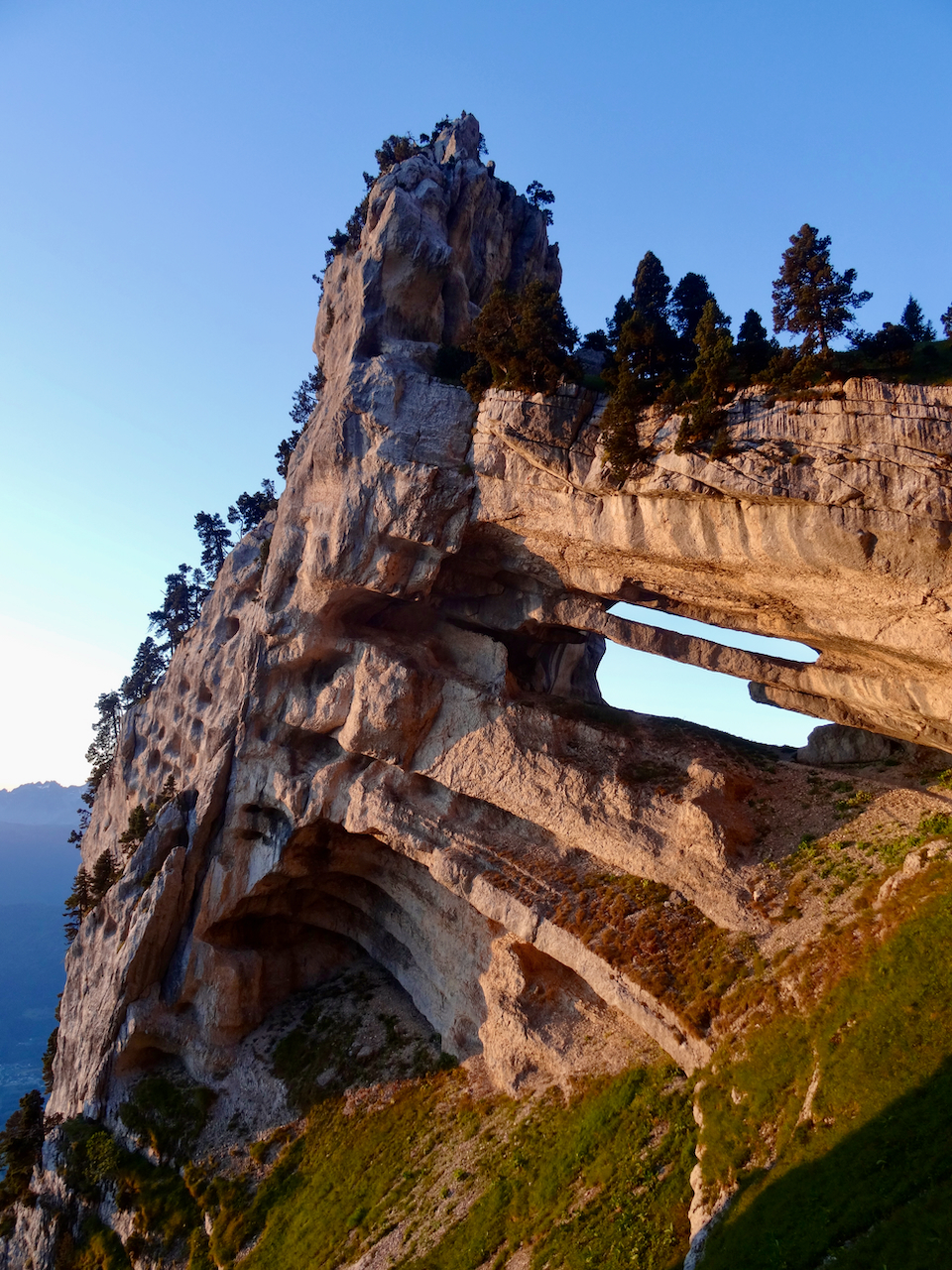
Tour Isabelle in the morning light, August 2018

The Tour Percée double arch, also named the Tour Isabelle arch, is a double natural arch, located in the Parc Naturel Régional de la Chartreuse, Chartreuse Mountains, France.

Its span is 32 metres (105 ft), which makes it the widest natural arch in the Alps.

It remained unknown for probably everybody, until its discovery in May 2005, when Pascal Sombardier, who was trekking to write his book Chartreuse inédite : Itinéraires insolites, dealing with lost places of the range, discovered it fortuitously. Its pictures illustrated the front cover of his book, published in 2006 : this double arch became then the symbol of the hidden treasures of the Chartreuse Mountains.

Located in a very remote area, with a difficult and dangerous access, very few guide books, even the most recent ones, mention its existence.

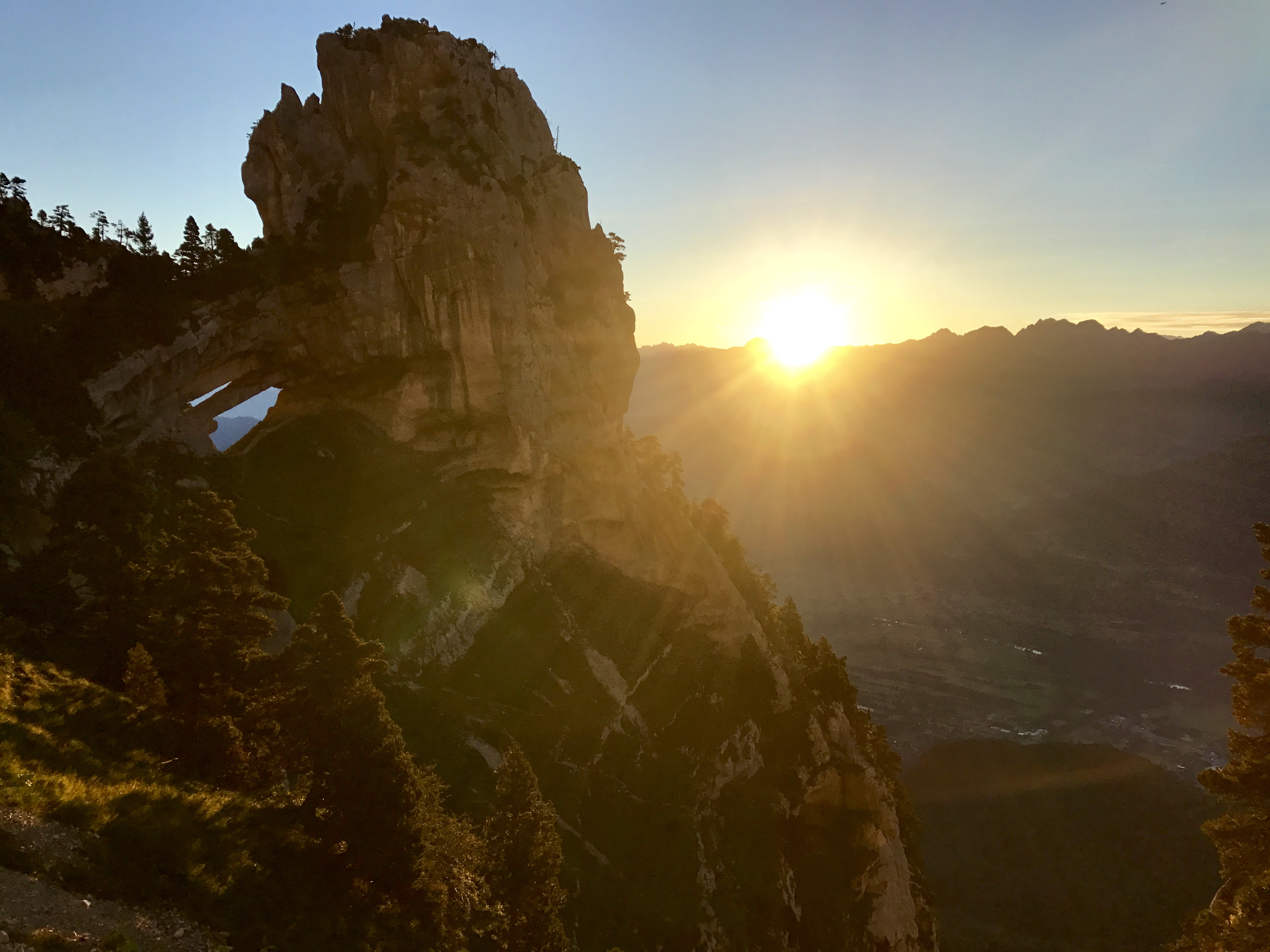
Dawn on Tour Percée (South face)

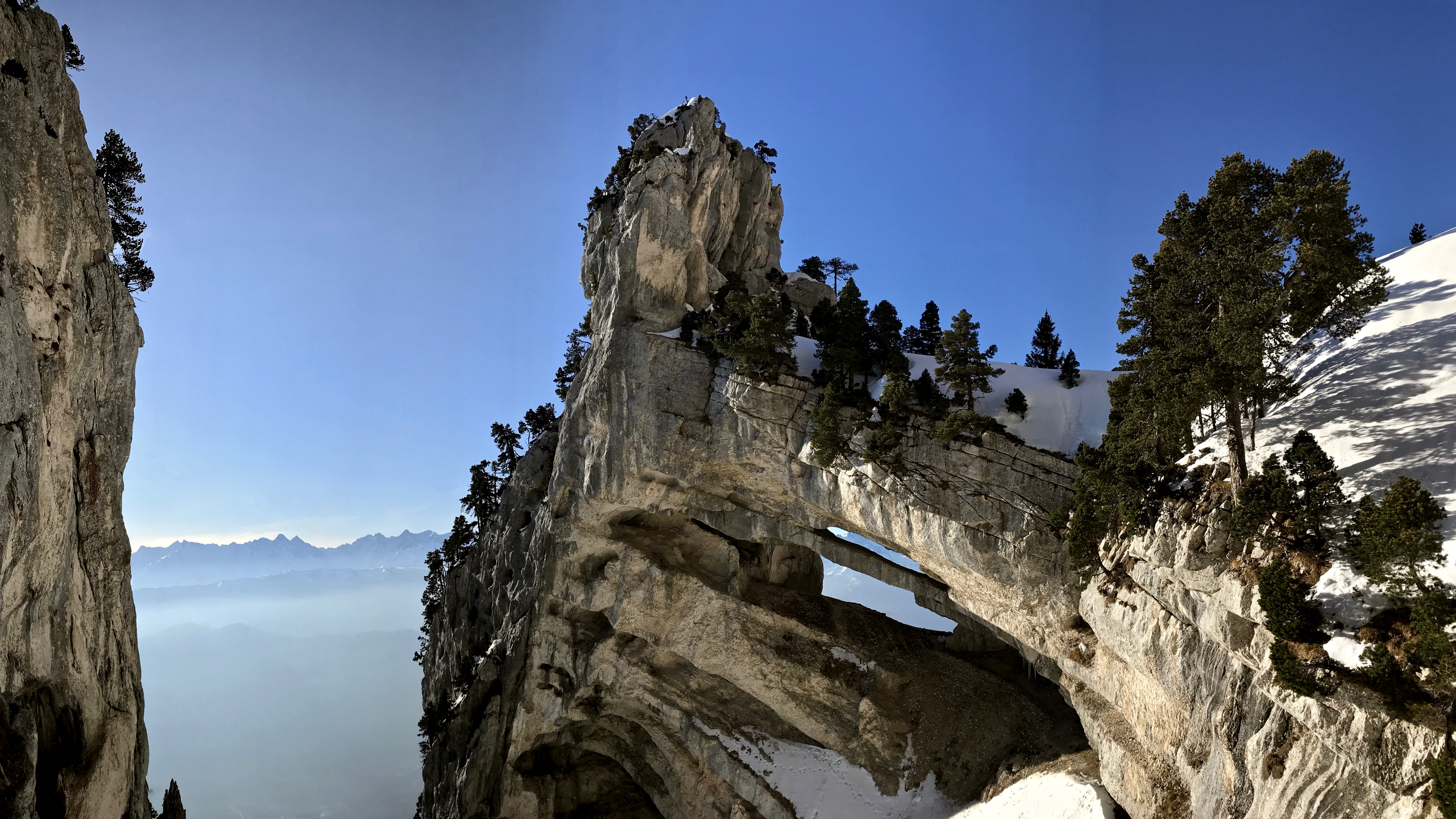
Tour Percée in the Spring time

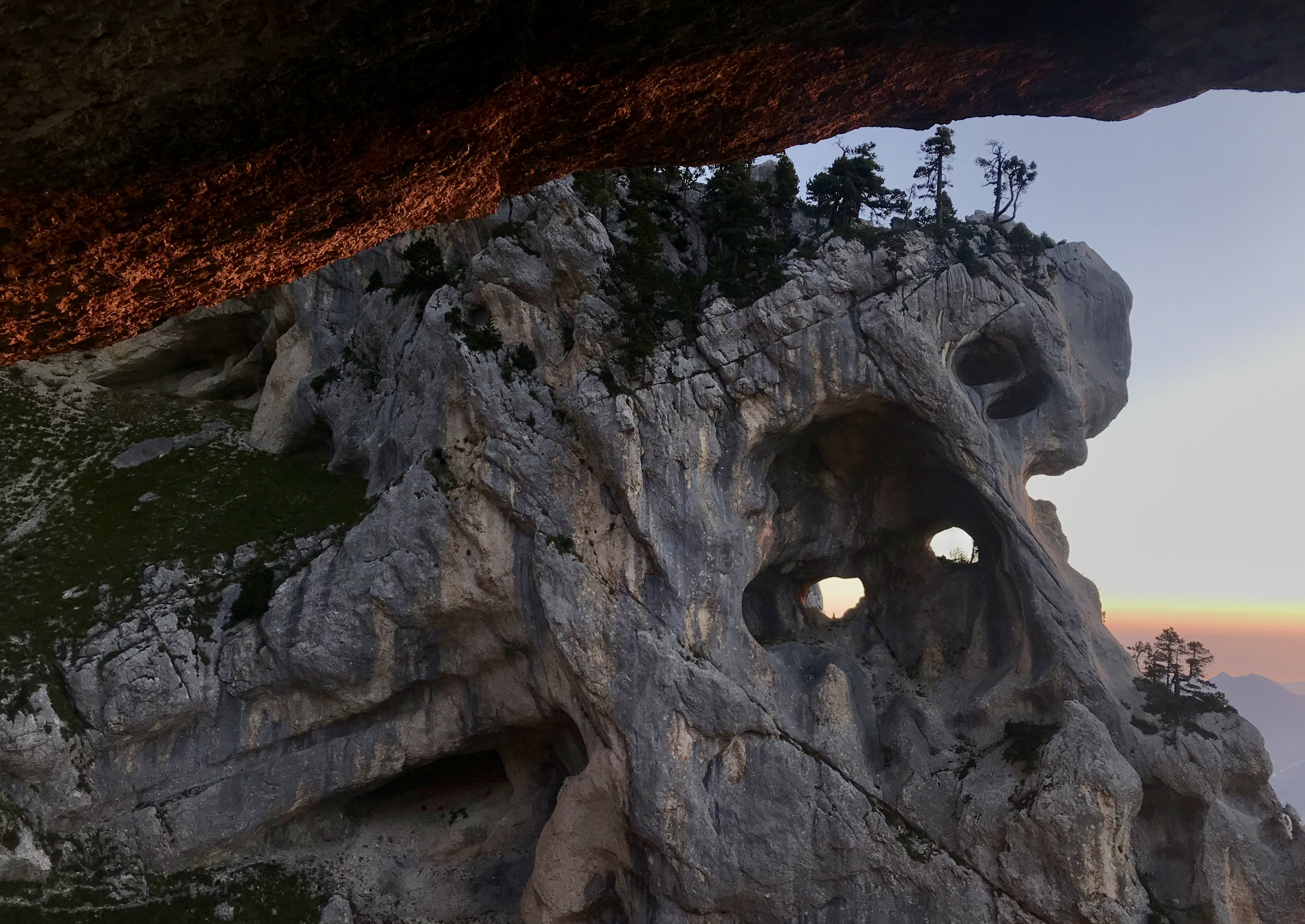
Tour Isabelle neighboring skulls

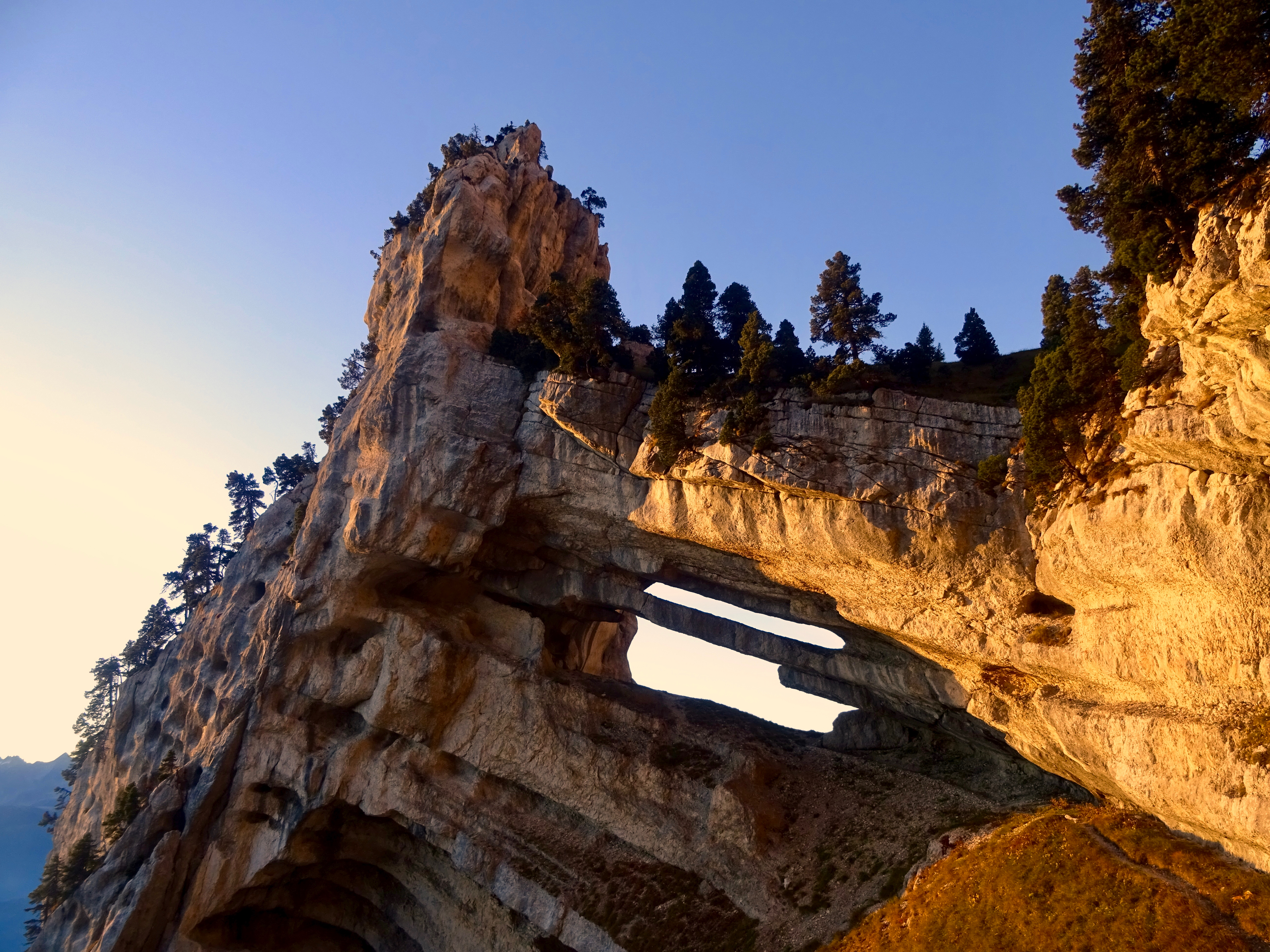
Tour Percée right after dawn

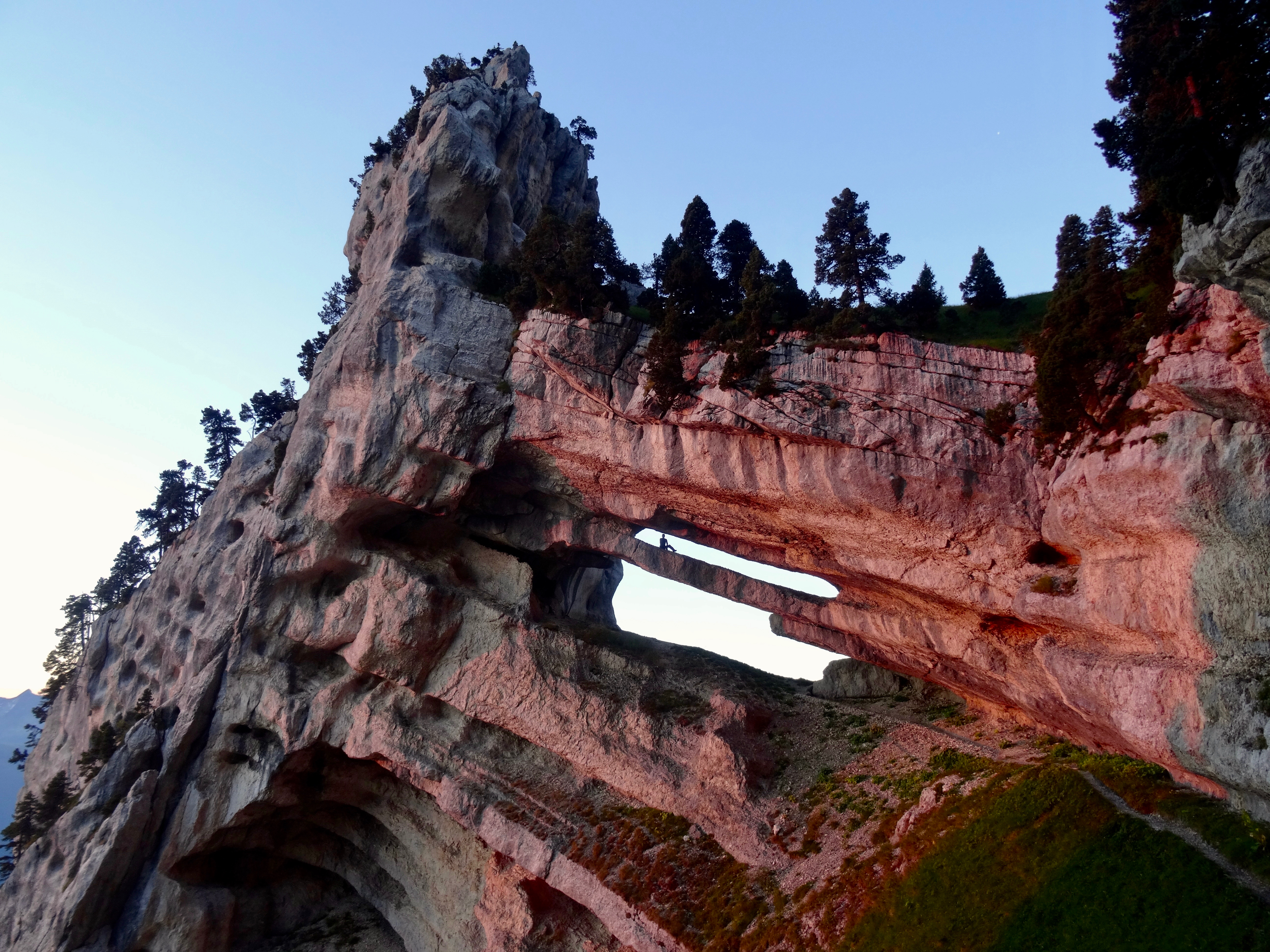
Tour Isabelle with person sitting above the main arch to give scale

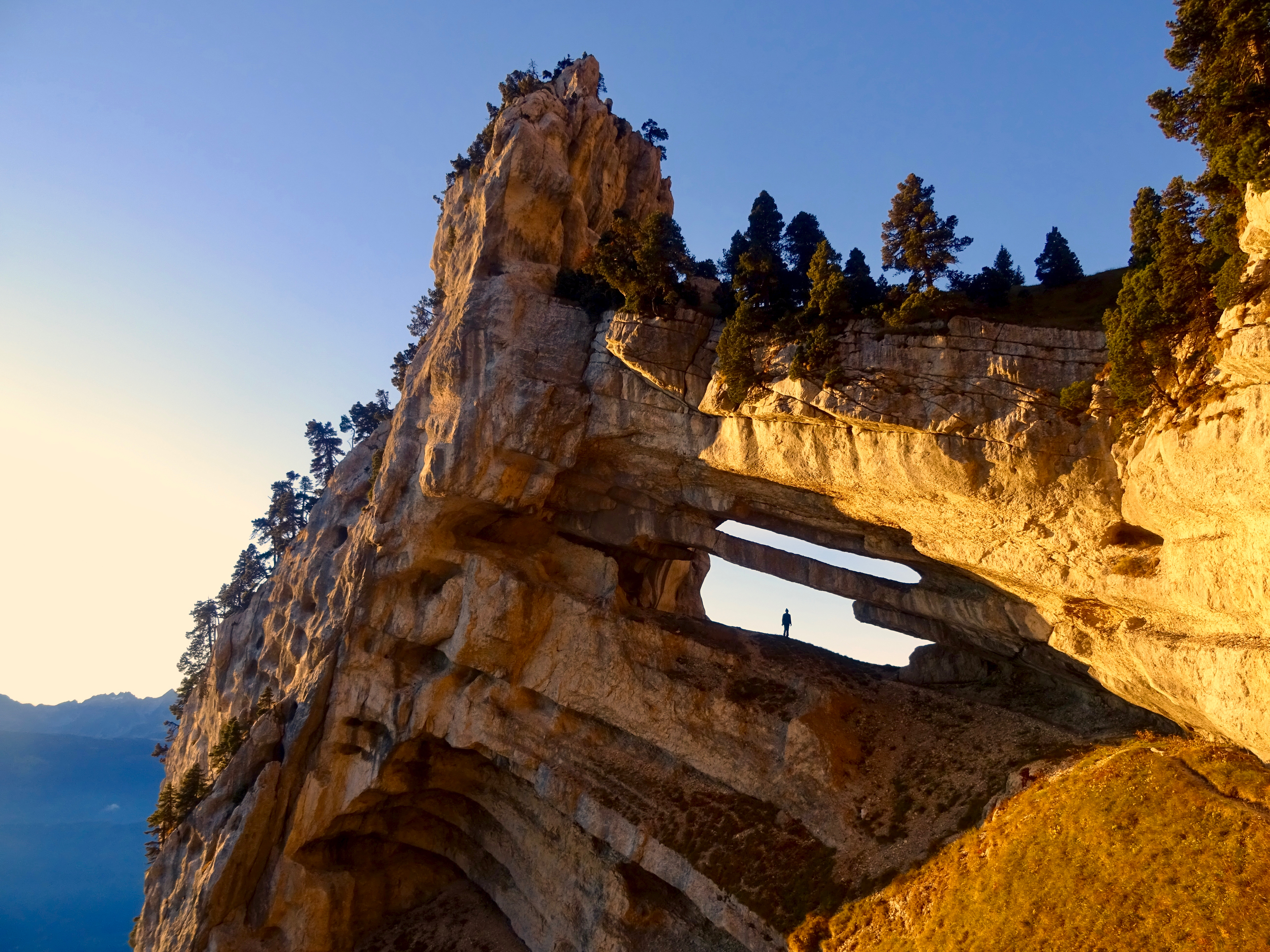
Tour Isabelle with person standing under main arch to give scale

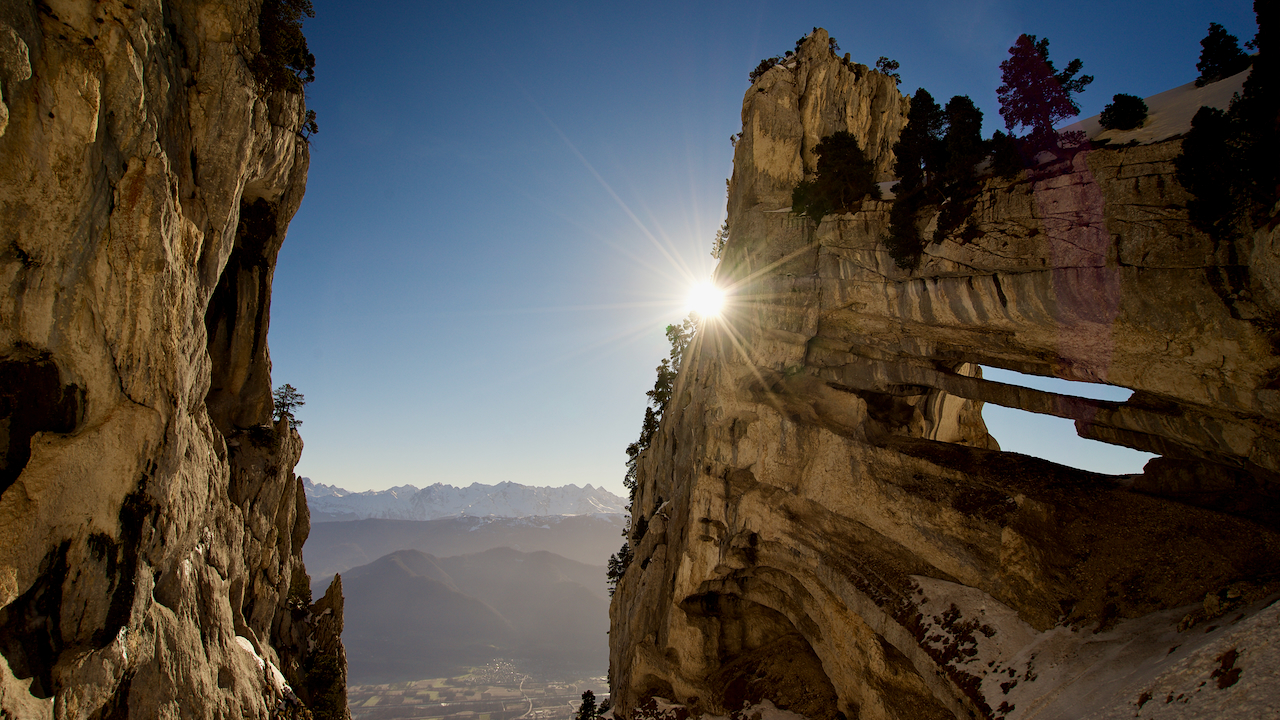
Tour Isabelle in the Winter time

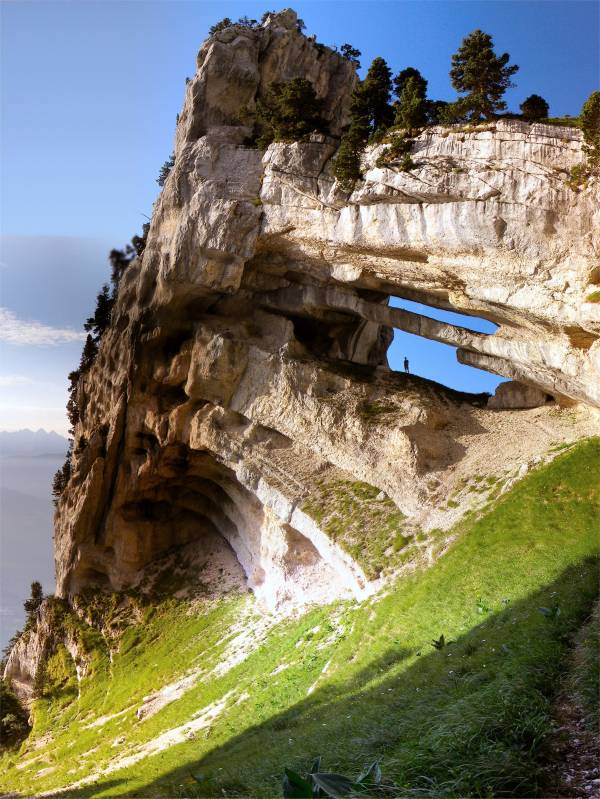
The double arch
