= Col du Cucheron =

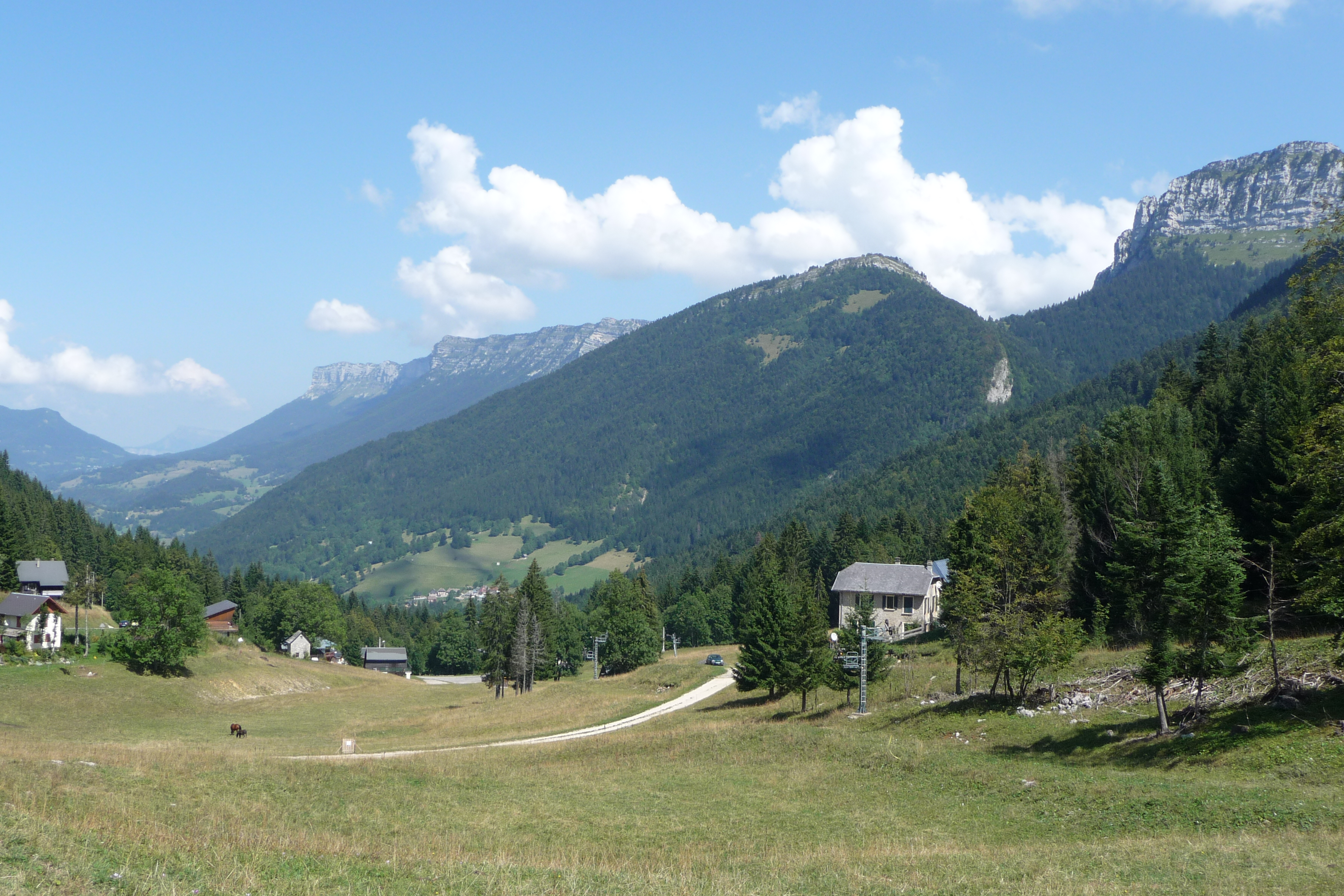
- View from the col du Cucheron, in direction of Saint-Pierre-d'Entremont

- Location within France
- Elevation: 1,139 metres (3,737 ft)
- Traversed by: D512

Third Approach
- Location: Isère, France
- Range: Alps
- Coordinates: 45°21′56″N 5°50′04″E

The Col du Cucheron, reaching a height of 1139 meters, is part of a series of low points in the "three passes" of the Chartreuse massif. These passes connect Saint-Pierre-de-Chartreuse to the south with Saint-Pierre d'Entremont to the north.. The Col du Cucheron presents a challenging ascent, marked by an average gradient of 7.5% and a maximum incline of 10.2%. As a result, it provides an engaging, yet demanding, route for cyclists and other outdoor recreation enthusiasts.

Hence, it lies between the Grand Som west and the Lances de Malissard east.
