= Chartreuse Mountains =

Mountain range in southeastern France

Coordinates: 45°21′N 5°50′E

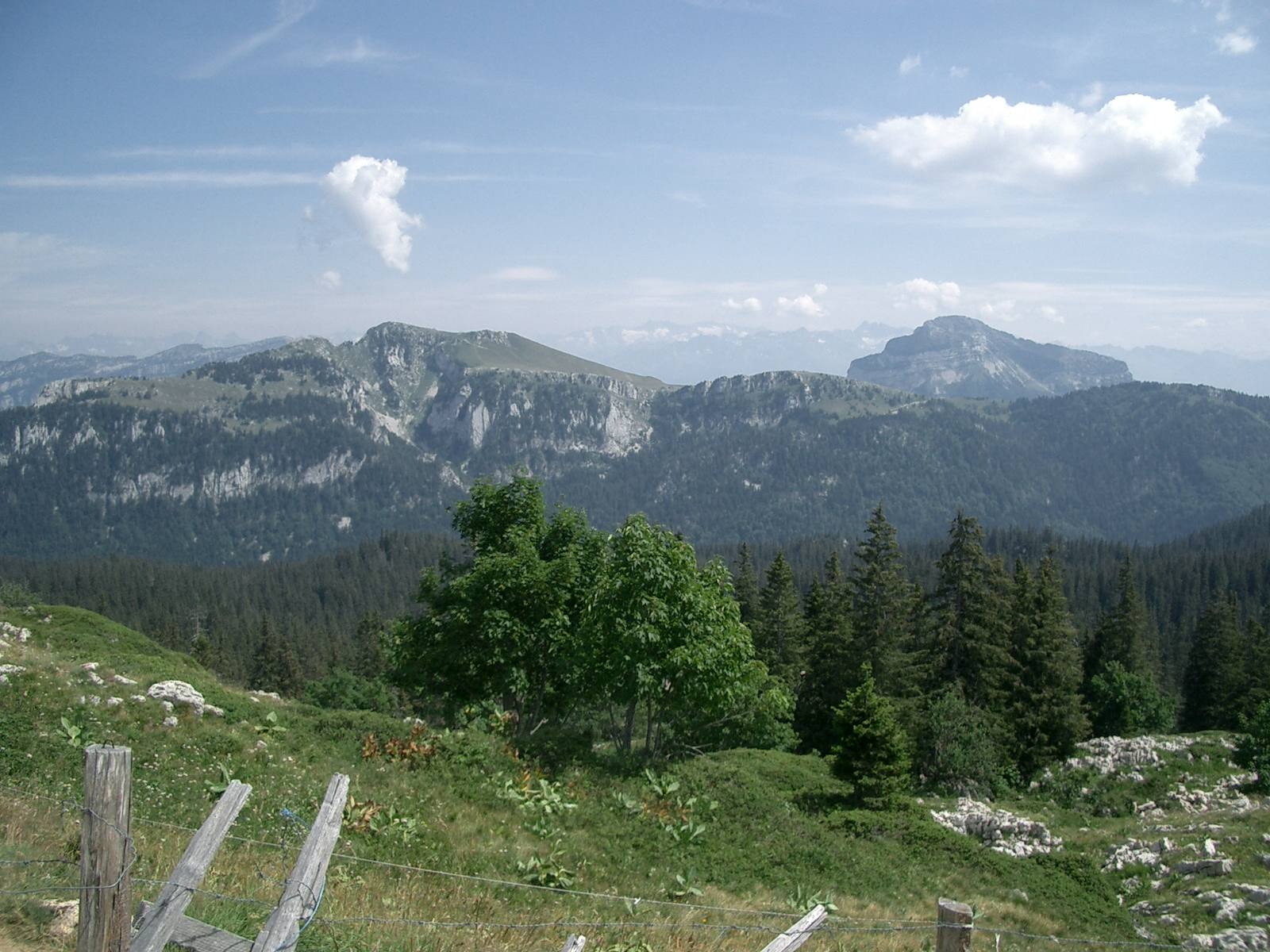
The Charmant Som and Chamechaude from the Col de la Grande Vache

Map of the Chartreuse massif

The Chartreuse Mountains (French: Massif de la Chartreuse [masif d(ə) la ʃaʁtʁøz]) are a mountain range in southeastern France, stretching from the city of Grenoble in the south to the Lac du Bourget in the north. They are part of the French Prealps, which continue as the Bauges to the north and the Vercors to the south.

== Etymology ==
The name Chartreuse is derived from the village now known as Saint-Pierre-de-Chartreuse, earlier Catorissium, Cantourisa, Caturissium, and Chatrousse. It appears to be of Gaulish origin; and is perhaps related to the name of the Caturiges tribe.

== Geography ==
The mountain range rises between Grenoble (south), Chambéry (north), Voiron and Saint-Laurent-du-Pont (west) and Grésivaudan (Isère valley, east)

=== Main summits ===
Summits of the Chartreuse Mountains include:

- Chamechaude, 2,082 metres (6,831 ft)
- Dent de Crolles, 2,062 metres (6,765 ft)
- Les Lances de Malissard 2,045 metres (6,709 ft)
- Grand Som, 2,026 metres (6,647 ft)
- Dôme de Bellefont 1,975 metres (6,480 ft)
- Piton de Bellefont 1,958 metres (6,424 ft)
- Mont Granier, 1,933 metres (6,342 ft)
- La Grande Sure, 1,920 metres (6,299 ft)
- Le Charmant Som 1,867 metres (6,125 ft)
- Sommet du Pinet ou le Truc 1,867 metres (6,125 ft)
- Rochers de Chalves 1,845 metres (6,053 ft)
- Rocher de Lorzier 1,838 metres (6,030 ft)
- Dent de l'Ours 1,820 metres (5,971 ft)
- Scia 1,791 metres (5,876 ft)
- Petit Som 1,772 metres (5,814 ft)
- Pinéa 1,771 metres (5,810 ft)
- Mont Outheran 1,673 metres (5,489 ft)
- Grands Crêts 1,489 metres (4,885 ft)
- Pointe de la Gorgeat 1,486 metres (4,875 ft)
- Écoutoux 1,406 metres (4,613 ft)
- mont Saint-Eynard 1,358 metres (4,455 ft)
- Néron 1,298 metres (4,259 ft)
- Rachais 1,050 metres (3,445 ft)

=== Main passes ===
Passes of the Chartreuse Mountains include :

==== With road ====
- Col de la Charmette
- Col de la Cluse
- Col du Coq
- Col du Cucheron
- Col du Granier
- Col de Porte
- Col de Palaquit
- Col de Vence
- Col de la Placette

==== Without road ====
- Col de l'Alpe
- Col de l'Alpette
- Col des Ayes
- Col de Charmille
- Col des Émeindras
- Col de la Faîta
- Col de Bellefond
- Col de Léchaud
- Col de la Ruchère
- Col de la Sure
- Col de la Grande Vache
- Col de la Petite Vache
- Col du Baure

=== Main canyons ===
Canyons of the Chartreuse Mountains include :

- Gorges du Guiers Vif
- Gorges du Guiers Mort
- Gorges du Ténaison
- Gorges de la Vence
- Gorge du Manival
- Gorges de l'Echaillon
- Gorges du Cozon Rau

=== Main plateaux ===
Plateaux of the Chartreuse Mountains include :

- Plateau des Petites Roches
- Plateau du Grand-Ratz

=== Main Caves ===
The main caves in the Chartreuse include :

- Réseau de l'Alpe,
  69.6 kilometres (43.2 mi) long, 655 metres (2,149 ft) deep.
- Réseau de la Dent de Crolles - about 60 kilometres (37 mi) long, 690 metres (2,260 ft) deep.
- Système du Granier, 55.7 kilometres (34.6 mi) long, 635 metres (2,083 ft) deep.
- Réseau de malissard, 18.2 kilometres (11.3 mi) long, 415 metres (1,362 ft) deep.
- Système Pinet-Brouillard, 11.2 kilometres (7.0 mi) long, 507 metres (1,663 ft) deep.

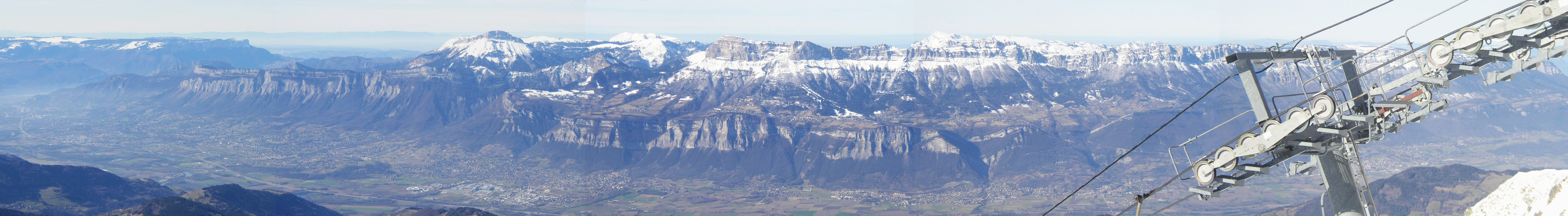
Panorama of the Grésivaudan Valley and the Chartreuse Mountains from Les Sept Laux.

== Geology ==
The lithology is dominated by limestone, and several hundred kilometres of cave passages lie beneath the hills, including the world-famous 60 km long Dent de Crolles system.

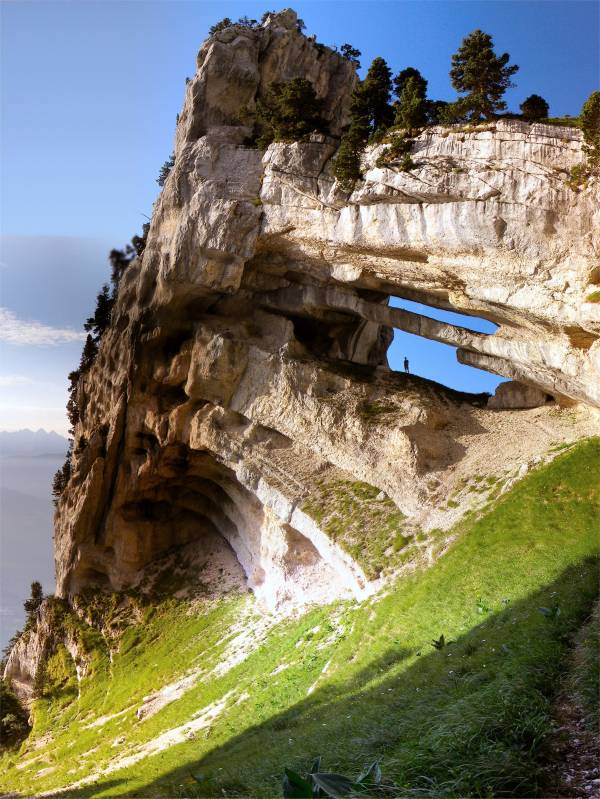
The Tour Percée Double Arch, at 32 metres (105 ft) the longest span in the Alps.

== Winter sports resorts ==
Chartreuse winter sports resorts include :

- Le Désert d'Entremont, where the use of snowshoes has been particularly developed
- Granier en Chartreuse
- Saint-Pierre-de-Chartreuse and Le Planolet
- Saint-Hugues-de-Chartreuse
- Col de Porte 1,326 metres (4,350 ft)
- Le Sappey-en-Chartreuse
- La Ruchère (cross-country skiing)
- Saint-Hilaire-du-Touvet
- Col de Marcieu
- Col du Coq

== Environment ==
- The Parc Naturel Régional de la Chartreuse was founded in May 1995.
- The Réserve Naturelle des Hauts de Chartreuse was founded in 1997. It includes seven Isère townships and four Savoie townships.

== Miscellaneous ==
The Chartreuse Mountains gave their name to the monastery of the Grande Chartreuse, the monastic Carthusian Order takes its name from these mountains, where its first hermitage was founded in 1084. Also derived from the mountain range's name is that of the alcoholic cordial Chartreuse produced by the monks since the 1740s, and of the chartreuse colour, greenish hue of the Chartreuse liqueur, named after the drink.
