= Saint-Pierre-d'Entremont, Isère =

Saint-Pierre-d'Entremont
- Commune
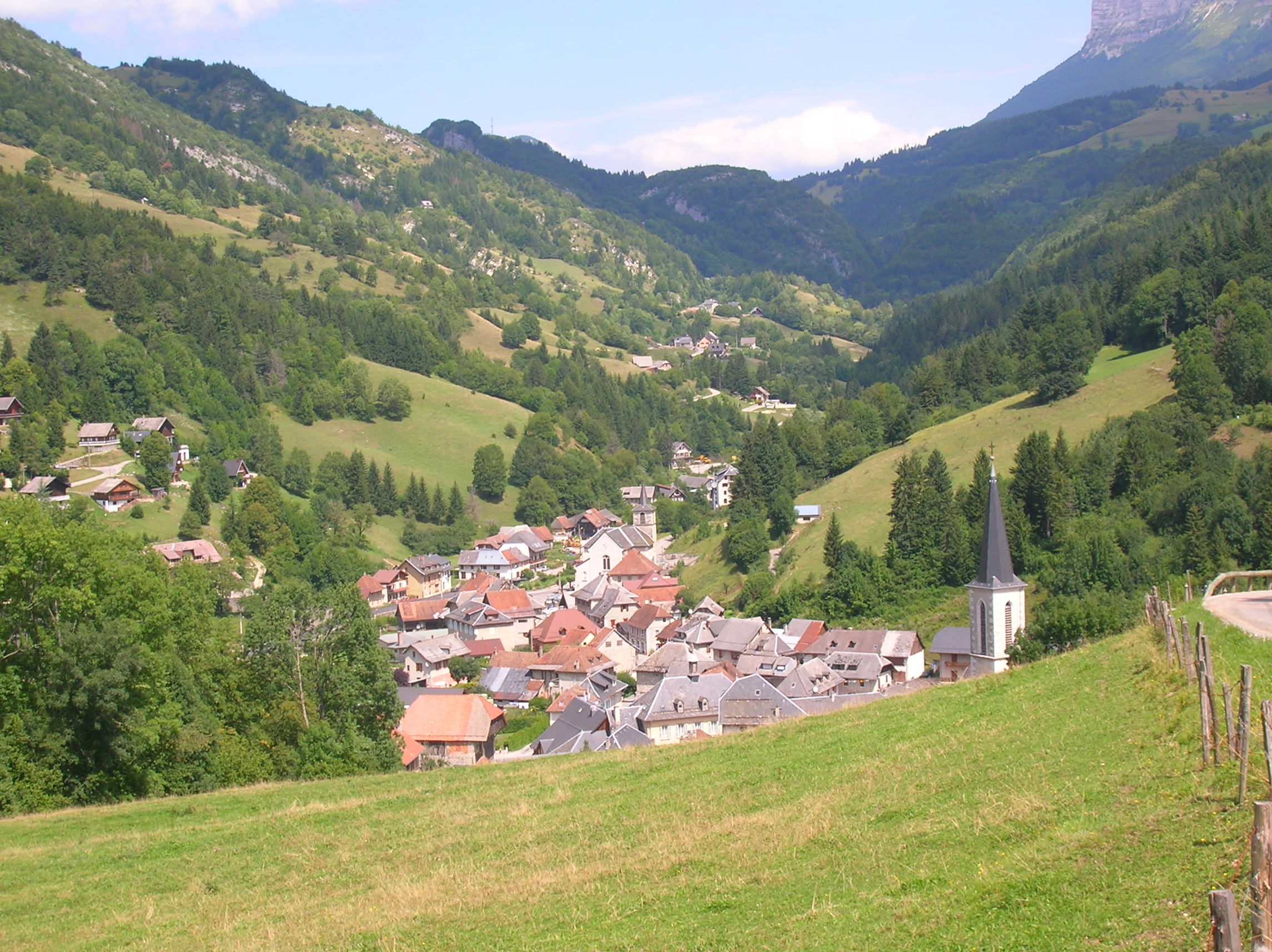
- A general view of Saint-Pierre-d'Entremont
- Location of Saint-Pierre-d'Entremont
- Location within France Location within Auvergne-Rhône-Alpes
- Coordinates: 45°24′58″N 5°51′17″E
- Country: France
- Region: Auvergne-Rhône-Alpes
- Department: Isère
- Arrondissement: Grenoble
- Canton: Chartreuse-Guiers
- Intercommunality: Cœur de Chartreuse

Government
  - Mayor (2020–2026): Marc Gautier
- Area^{1}: 32.31 km^{2} (12.47 sq mi)
- Highest elevation: 2,047 m (6,716 ft)
- Lowest elevation: 598 m (1,962 ft)
- Population (2023): 581
  - Density: 18.0/km^{2} (46.6/sq mi)
- Time zone: UTC+01:00 (CET)
  - Summer (DST): UTC+02:00 (CEST)
- INSEE/Postal code: 38446 /73670
- ^{1} French Land Register data, which excludes lakes, ponds, glaciers > 1 km^{2} (0.386 sq mi or 247 acres) and river estuaries.

Saint-Pierre-d'Entremont (French pronunciation: [sɛ̃ pjɛʁ dɑ̃tʁəmɔ̃]) is a commune in the Isère department in the Auvergne-Rhône-Alpes region in southeastern France.

It lies in the parc naturel régional de Chartreuse, adjacent to Saint-Pierre-d'Entremont (Savoie) on the other side of the Guiers Vif.

== Population ==
Historical population
Year	Pop.	±% p.a.
1968	505	—
1975	440	−1.95%
1982	459	+0.61%
1990	443	−0.44%
1999	478	+0.85%
2007	565	+2.11%
2012	557	−0.28%
2017	571	+0.50%
2023	581	+0.29%
Source: INSEE

== Main natural areas ==
- Grand Som (mountain, 2,026 m)
- Cirque de Saint-Même (waterfalls and natural circus)
- Dent de l'Ours (mountain, 1,820 m)
- Lances de Malissard (mountain, 2,047m)

== See also ==
- Communes of the Isère department
