= Cirque de Saint-Même =

Rock formation in Auvergne-Rhône-Alpes, France

Coordinates: 45.4000°N 5.8911°E

The Cirque de Saint-Même is a natural amphitheater located in the east end of the massif de la Chartreuse in the French departments of Savoie (north) and the Isère (south) districts separated by the Guiers Vif, river through the natural circus.

== Information ==
Located at 900 m above sea level in the districts of Saint-Pierre d'Entremont, the circus is also part of the nature reserve Hauts de Chartreuse .

It is characterized by large layers of urgoniennes rocks, where four waterfalls (from the top to the bottom: Cascade des Sources, Grande cascade, Cascade isolée, Pisse du Guiers) are dominated by limestone cliffs of an elevation of 500 meters. The water comes from Guiers Vif underground sources, historical border between the Dauphiné and the Kingdom of Sardinia, and now this is the limit between the two departments of Savoie and Isère.Two important caves are present in the circus. The cave of Guiers Vif, downstream exit of the Malissard network, and the cave of Mort-Rû located further north at 1,130 m above sea level. The latter has a development of 8,000 m leading to a vertical drop of 331 m. An upper entrance was opened by the cavers, the Cave of the Masks, allowing a crossing of 252 m of elevation for 690 m of development.

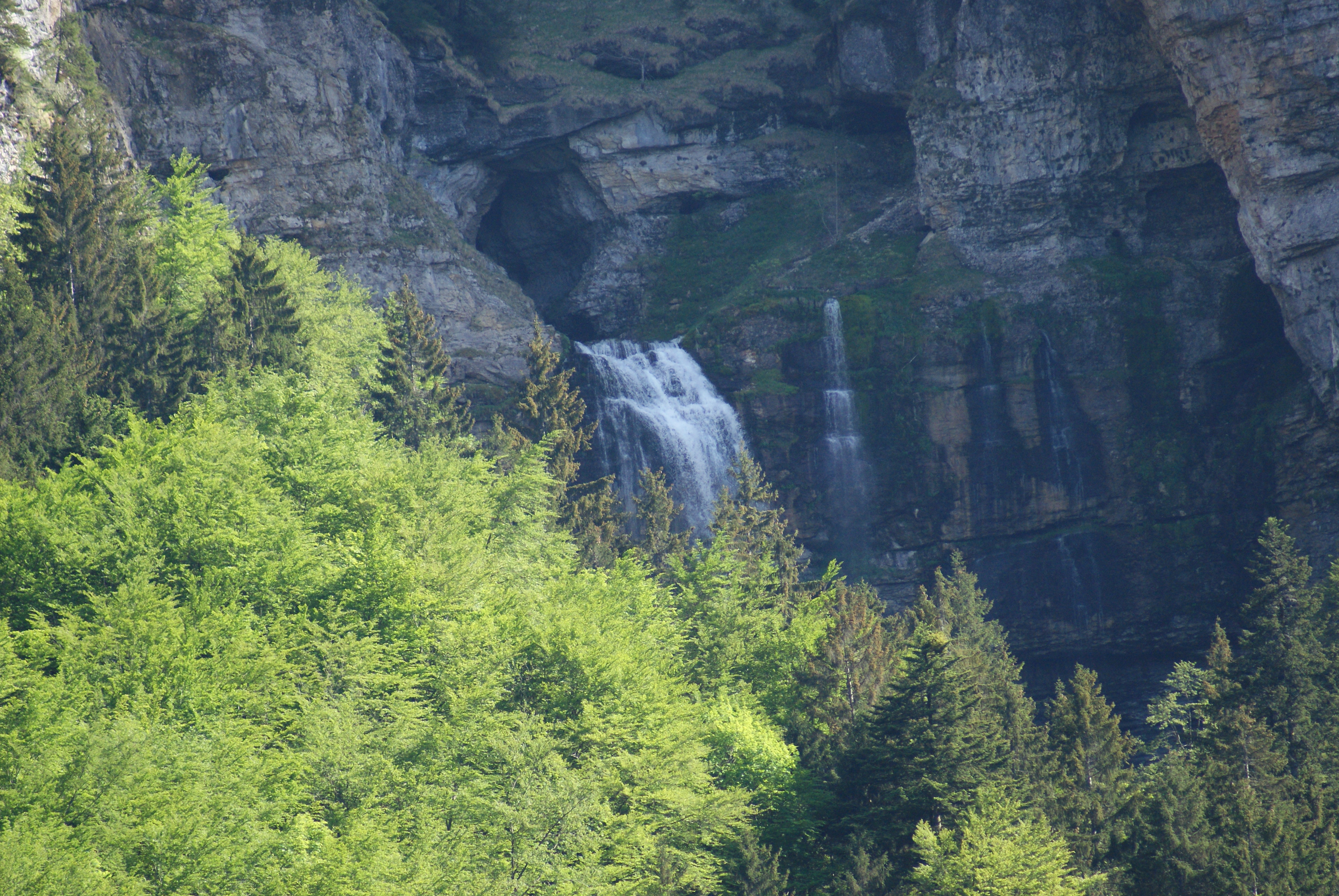
Cascade des sources (résurgence du Guiers)

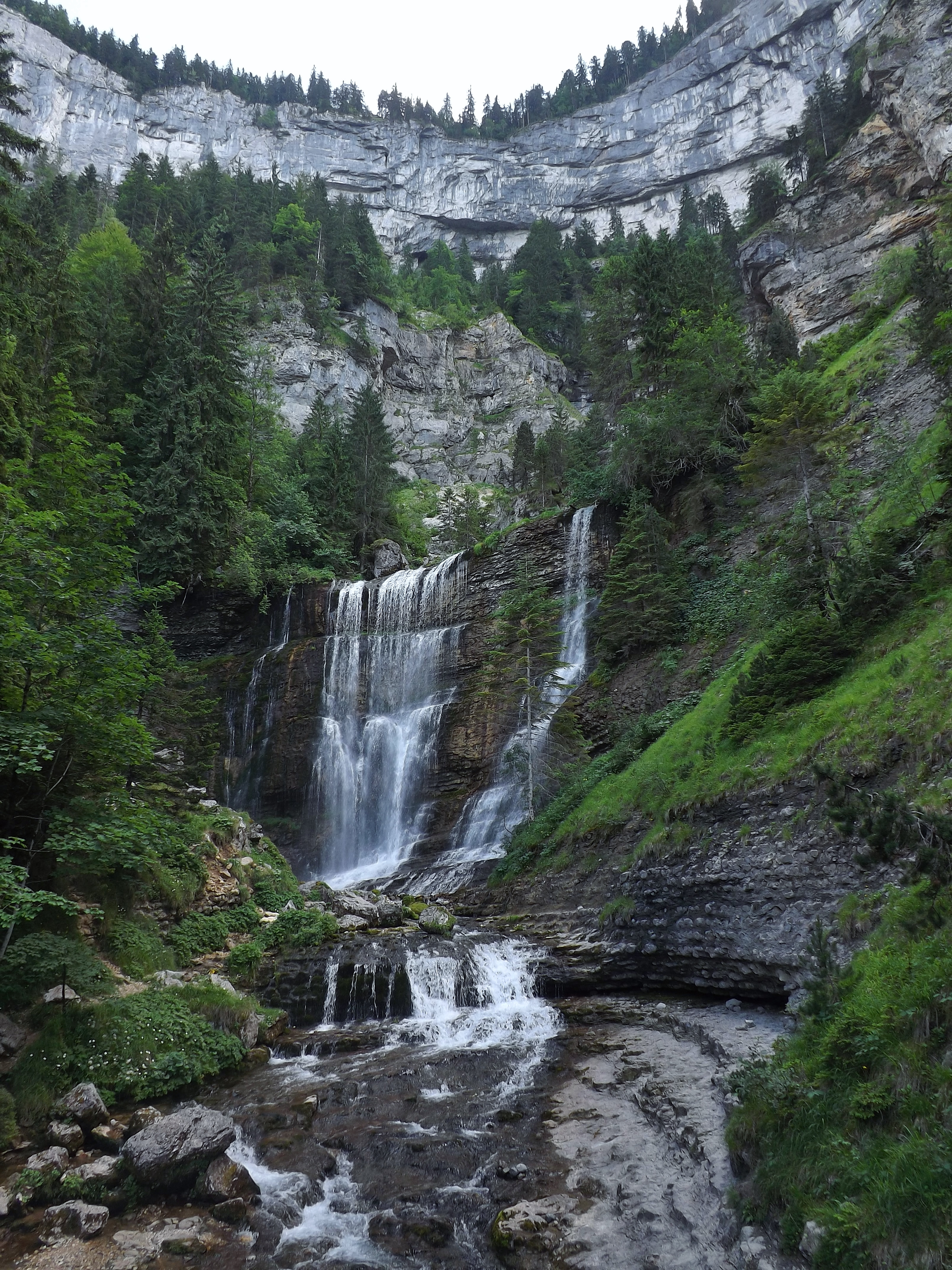
Grande Cascade

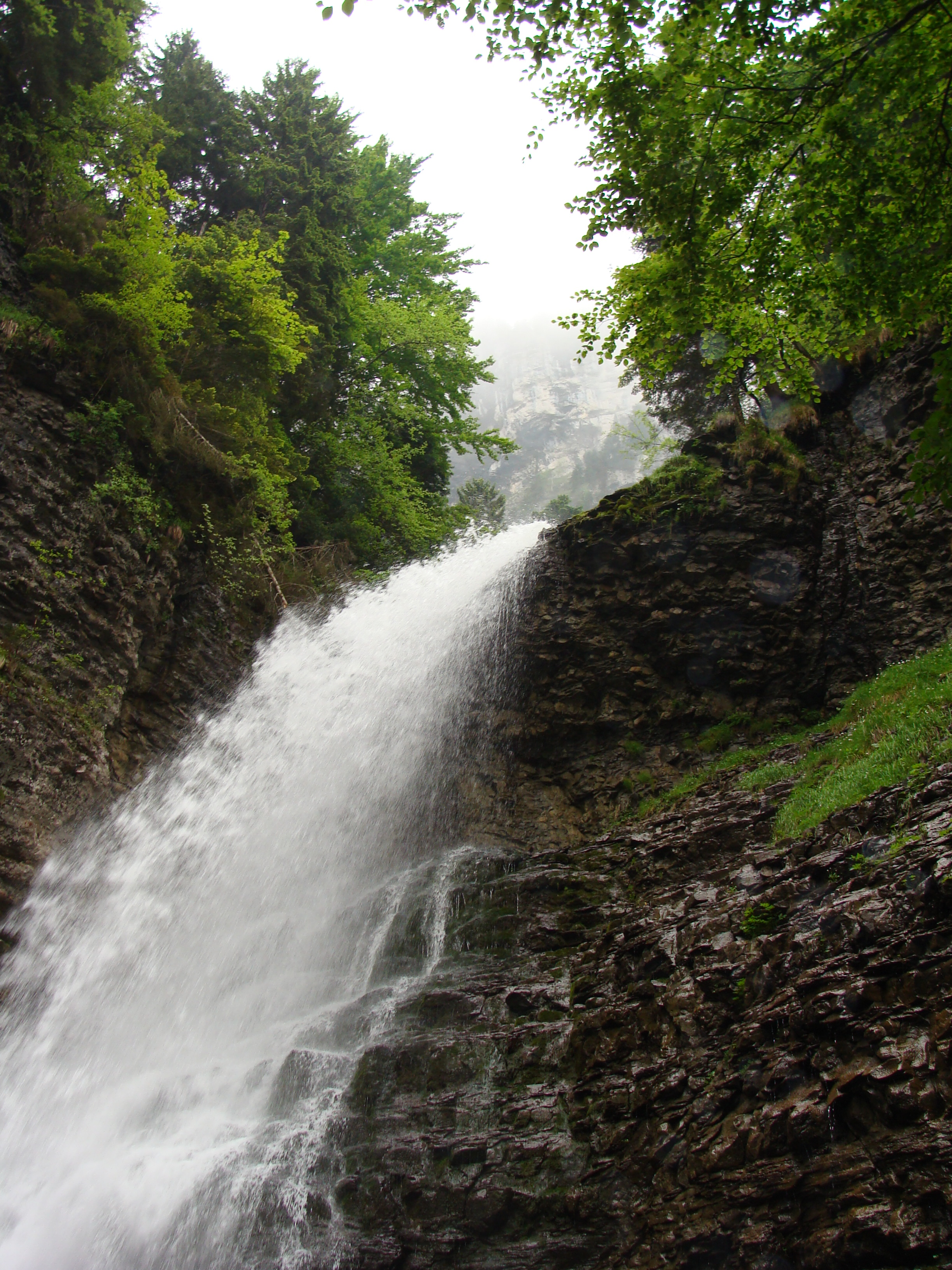
Cascade Isolée

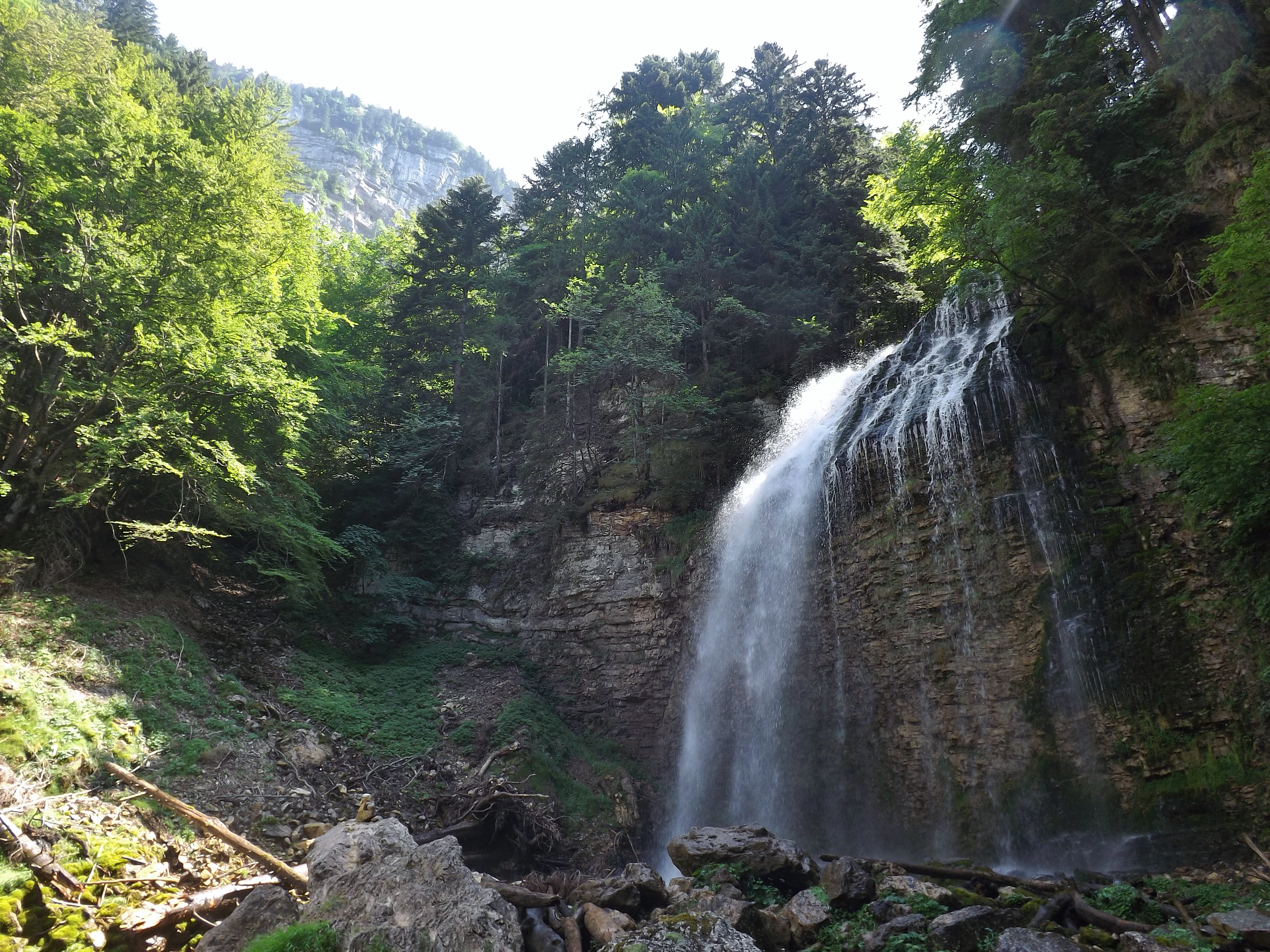
Pisse du Guiers

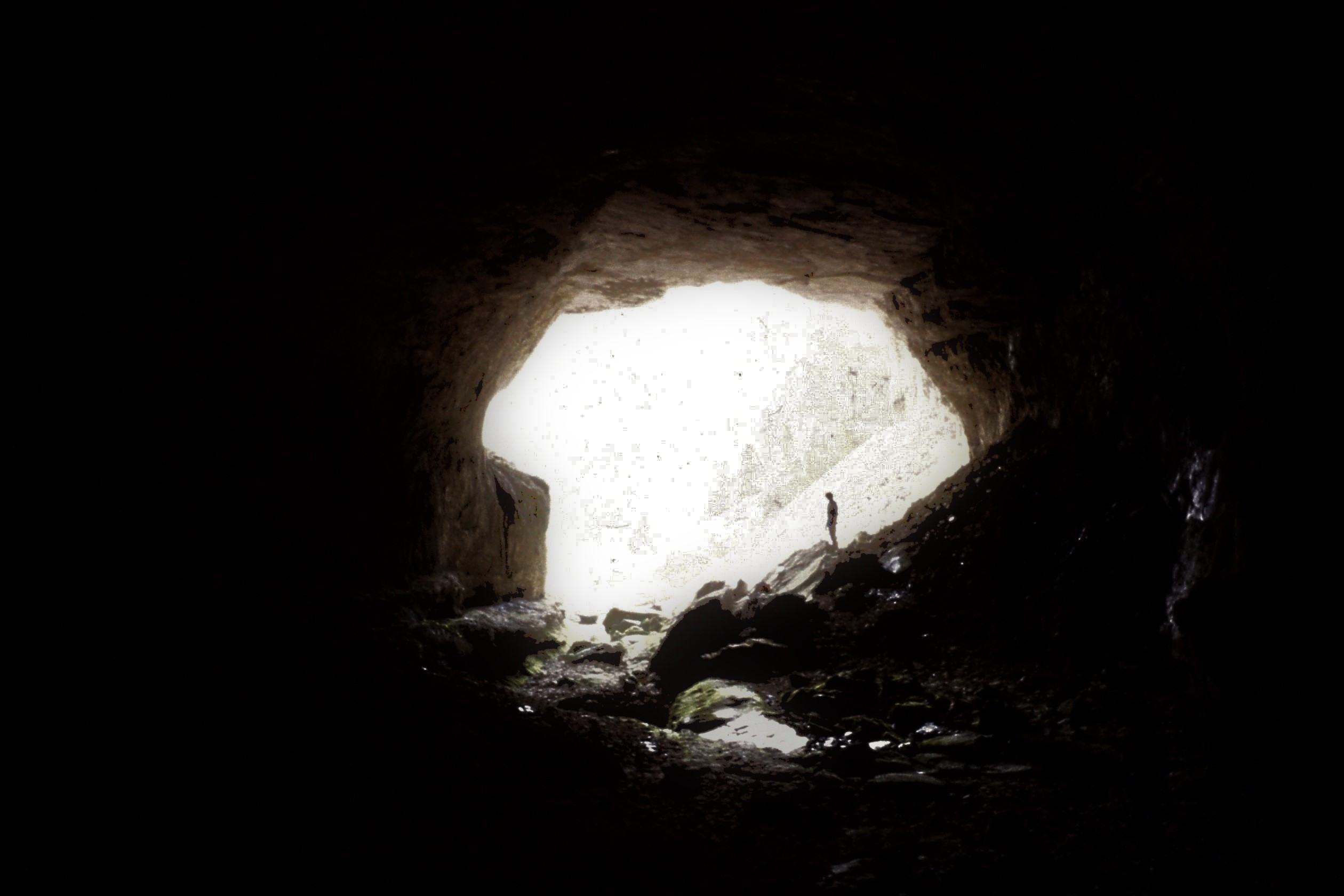
Entrance of cave of Guiers Vif
