= Guiers Vif =

River in eastern France

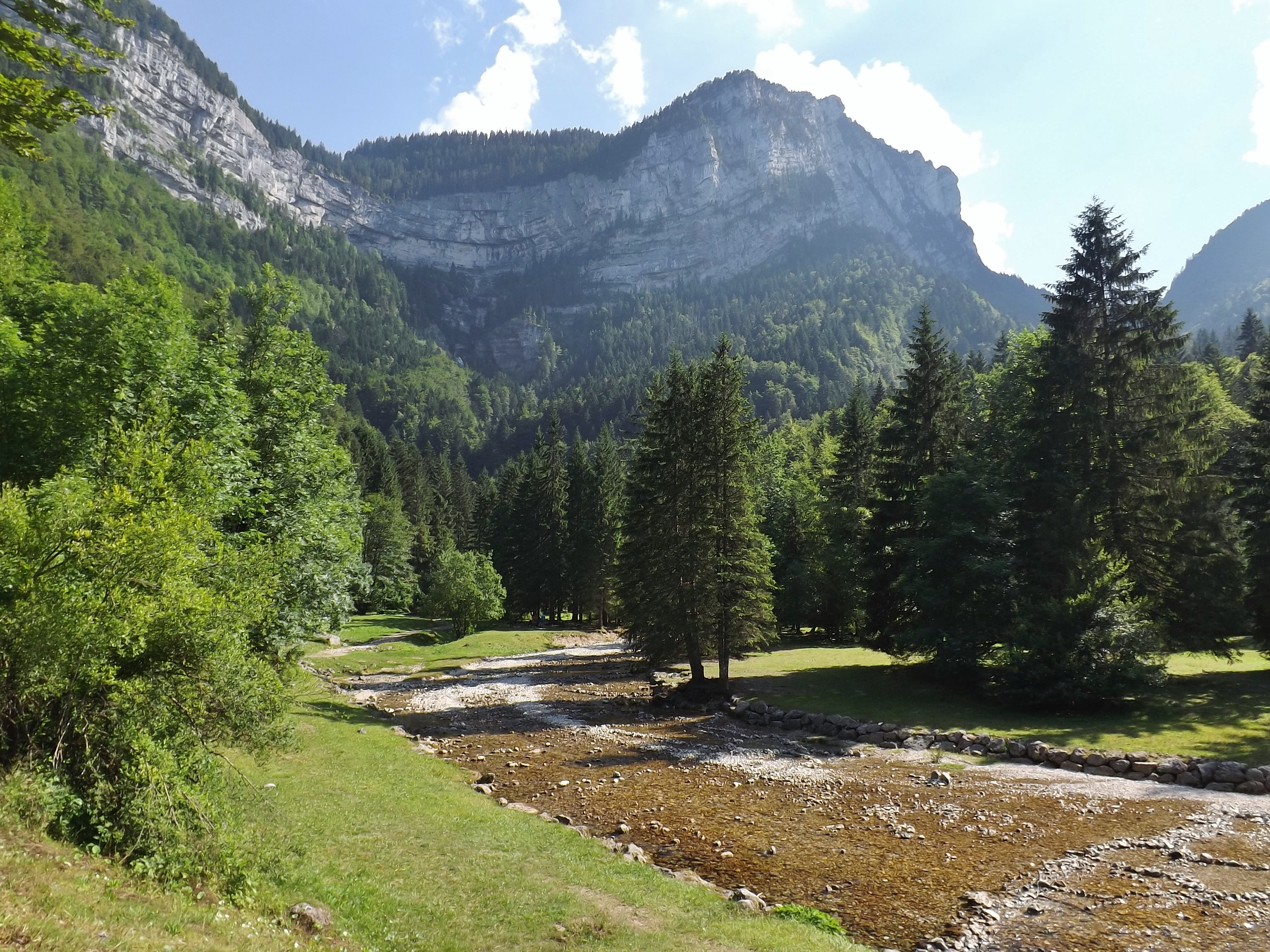

- Location within France Location within Auvergne-Rhône-Alpes

Location
- Countries: France

Physical characteristics
- Source: Cirque de Saint-Même
  - coordinates: 45.3869°N 5.919°E
- Mouth: Guiers
  - coordinates: 45.4368°N 5.7404°E
- Length: 16.9 km (10.5 mi)

Basin features
- Progression: Guiers→ Rhône→ Mediterranean Sea

The Guiers Vif (French pronunciation: [ɡje vif], literally live Guiers) is a river in Auvergne-Rhône-Alpes in eastern France. It is located in the Regional Natural Park of Chartreuse, on the border between the municipalities of Saint-Pierre-d'Entremont (Isère) and Saint-Pierre-d'Entremont (Savoie). Its source is in the Cirque de Saint-Même. It flows towards the northwest. For most of its course, the river forms the border between the departments of Isère and Savoie. Near the communes of Entre-deux-Guiers and Les Echelles, it ends after 16.9 km (10.5 mi) as a right tributary of the Guiers.
