= Lances de Malissard =

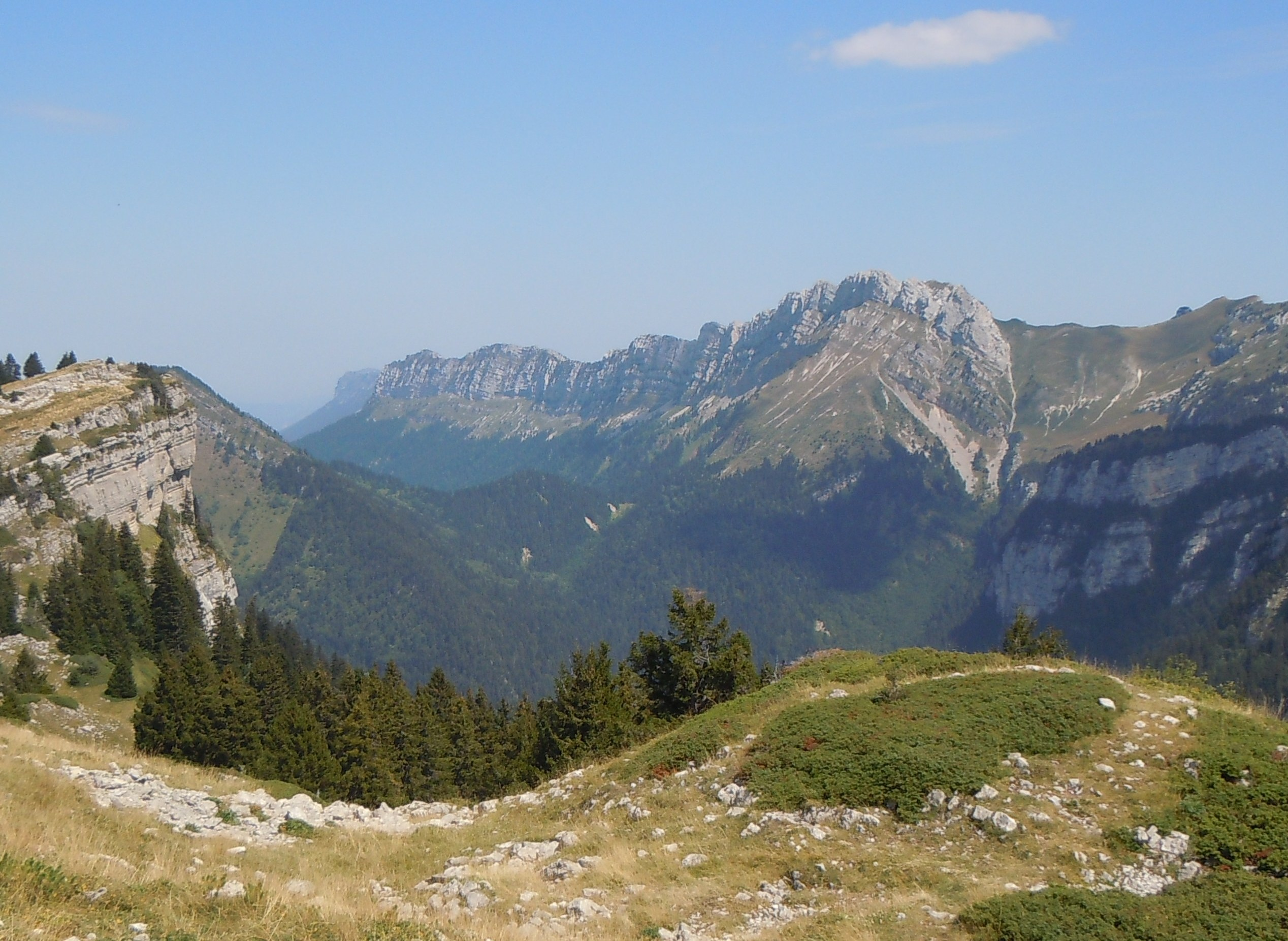
- Les Lances de Malissard from Pravouta

Highest point
- Elevation: 2,045 m (6,709 ft)
- Coordinates: 45°20′48″N 5°52′24″E

Geography
- Location within Alps
- Location: Isère, France
- Parent range: Chartreuse Mountains

Climbing
- Easiest route: Through the Cirque de Saint-Même

The Lances de Malissard are two summits, located in the Chartreuse Mountains in the Department of Isère, in the French Prealps. More than the peaks themselves, it is the long ridge that is north–south facing, that separate the col de Bellefond and a long alpine valley of another ridge, the Aulp du Seuil, that dominates the Gresivaudan valley. There are two "Lances" (summits) in the Lances de Malissard. The South "Lance" of Malissard culminates at 2,045 metres (6,709 ft) and north "Lance" of Malissard at 2,036 metres (6,680 ft). The Guiers Vif rises at the north end of the ridge of the Lances de Malissard.

== Caving ==
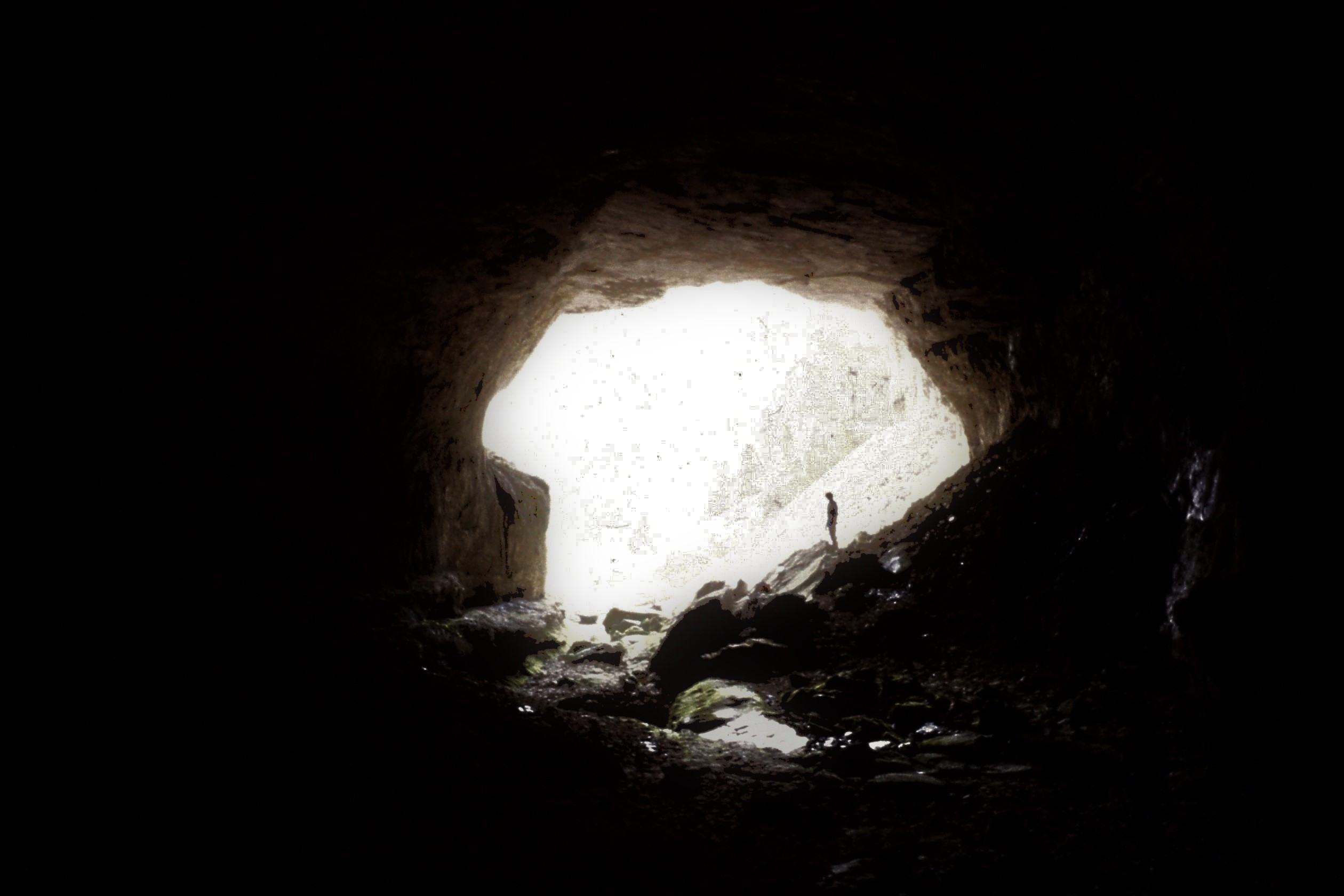
Entrance of the Guiers Vif cave

An important Speleological network is located under the lances of Malissard and not in the centre of the syncline of the Aulp du Seuil. The Malissard River develops on a north–south axis and exits the karst spring of the Guiers Vif 45.39050°N 5.89729°E. Its development is 17,793 metres (58,376 ft) for 415 metres (1,362 ft) depth. In 1992 the British pass the sump of Guiers Vif cave and make the junction with the Trou of the Flammes discovered in 1973 and located at the top. In 1993 the Tasurinchi chasm 45.39050°N 5.89729°E was connected to the entrance to the Guiers Vif. Two other chasms, the Ténébreux (−360 m) and the Cavernicole (−362 m), are located above the network but are not connected to the Malissard River.
