= Parc Naturel Régional de la Chartreuse =

Regional nature park in France

Coordinates: 45.3890°N 5.7965°E

Chartreuse Regional Nature Park
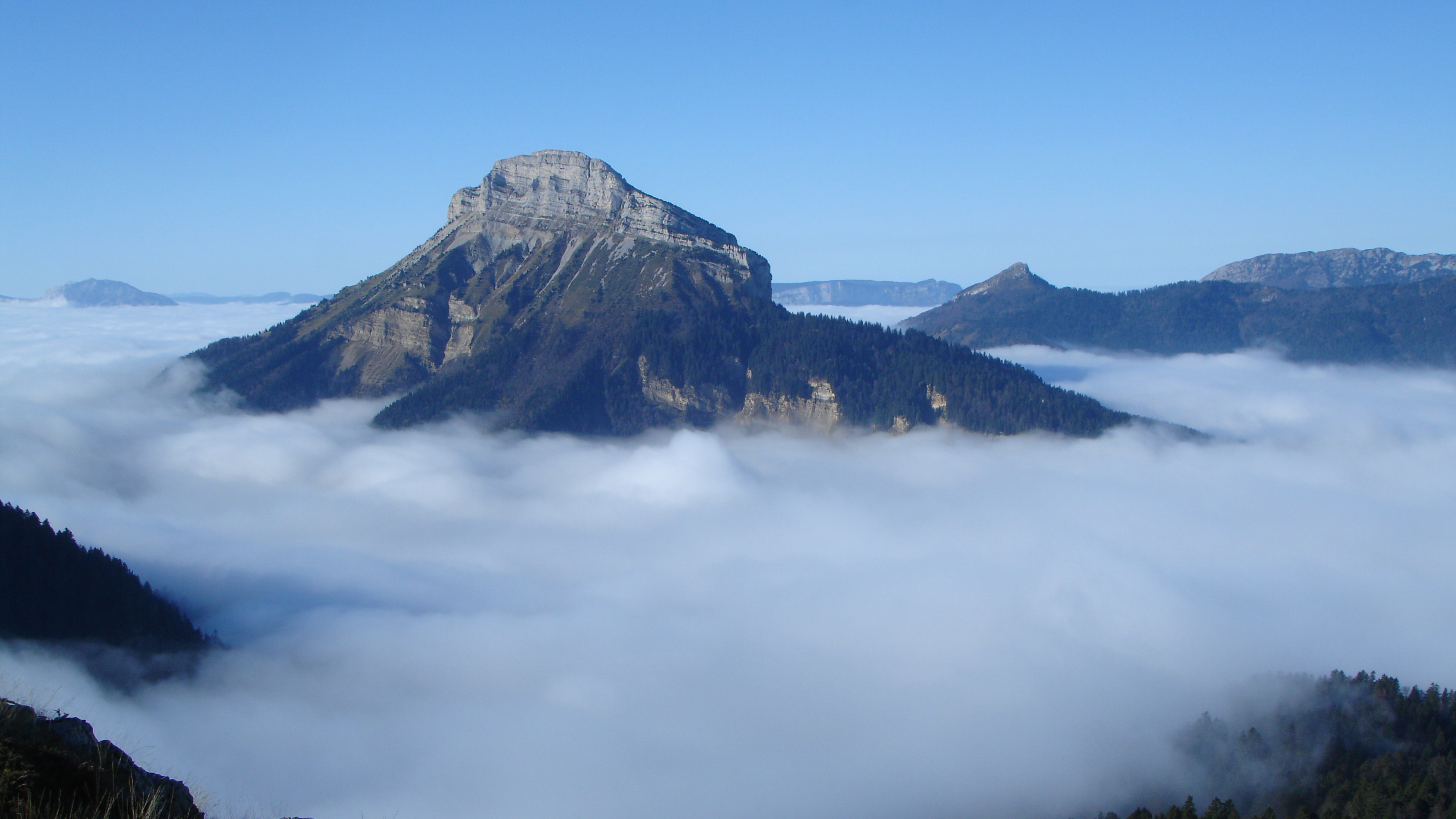
- Chamechaude summit shrouded in mist Park logo

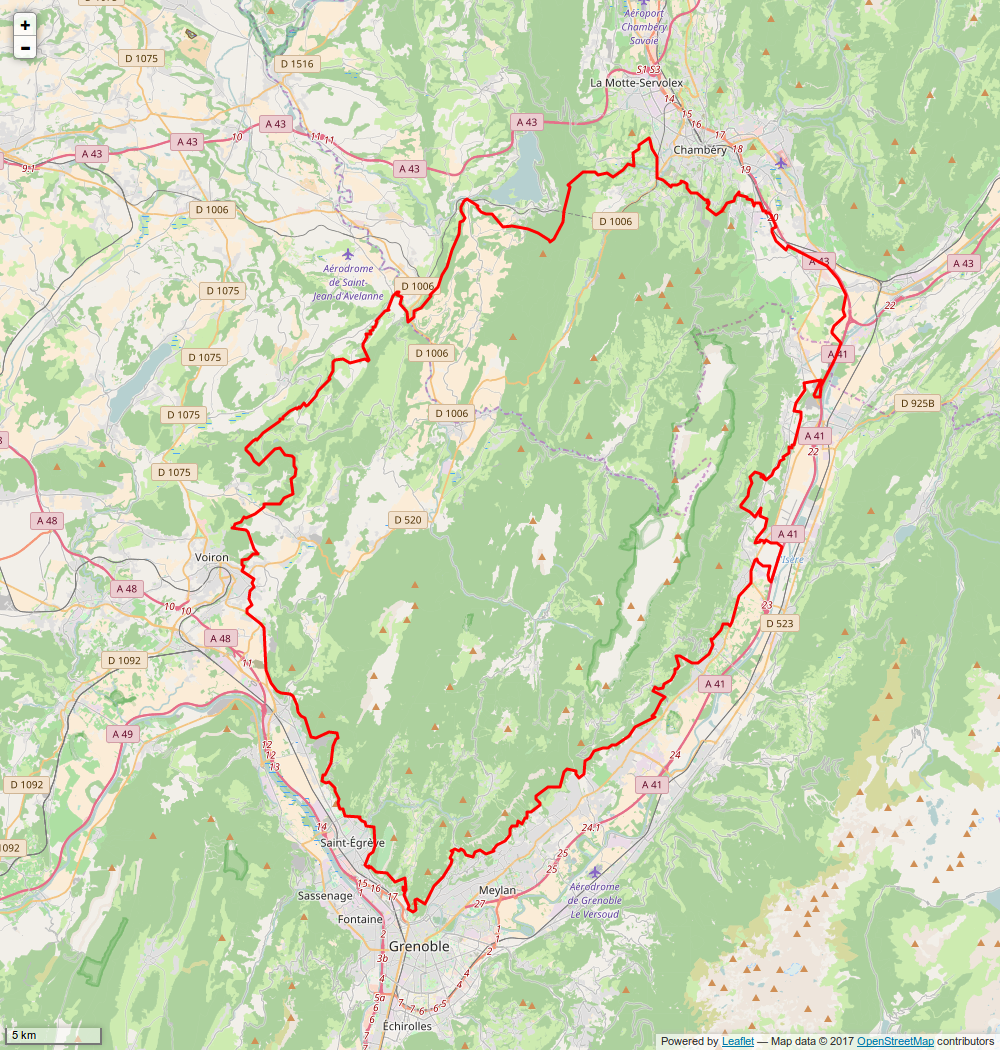
- Location: Rhône-Alpes
- Area: 767 km^{2} (296 sq mi)
- Established: 1995
- Named for: Chartreuse Mountains
- Governing body: Fédération des parcs naturels régionaux de France

Parc Naturel Régional de la Chartreuse (French pronunciation: [paʁk natyʁɛl ʁeʒjɔnal də la ʃaʁtʁøz], "Chartreuse Regional Nature Park") is a regional nature park located in the region Rhône-Alpes between Chambéry, Grenoble and Voiron, on the border of the departments of Isère and Savoie. It is based on the massif de la Chartreuse and covers an area of 76,700 hectares with a population of about 50,000. The park was established in 1995.

== Gallery ==
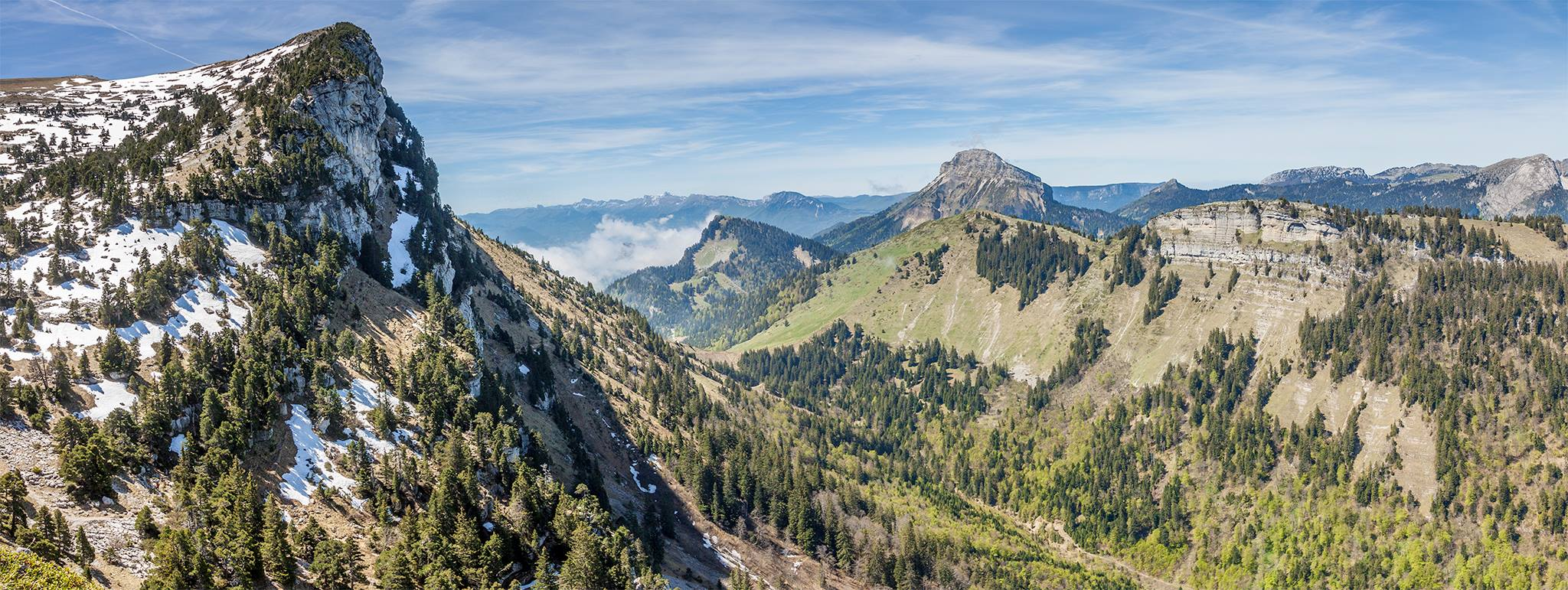

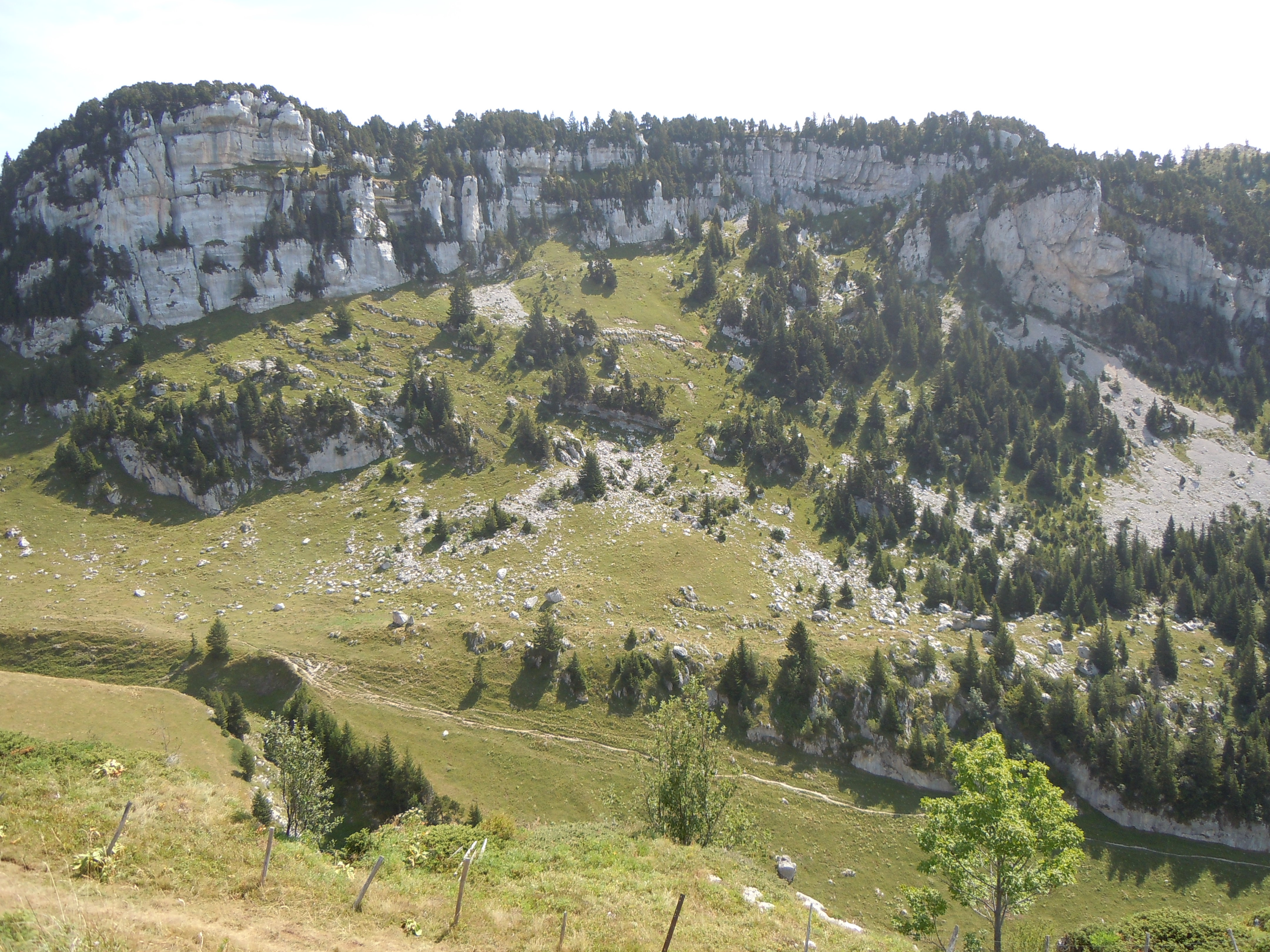

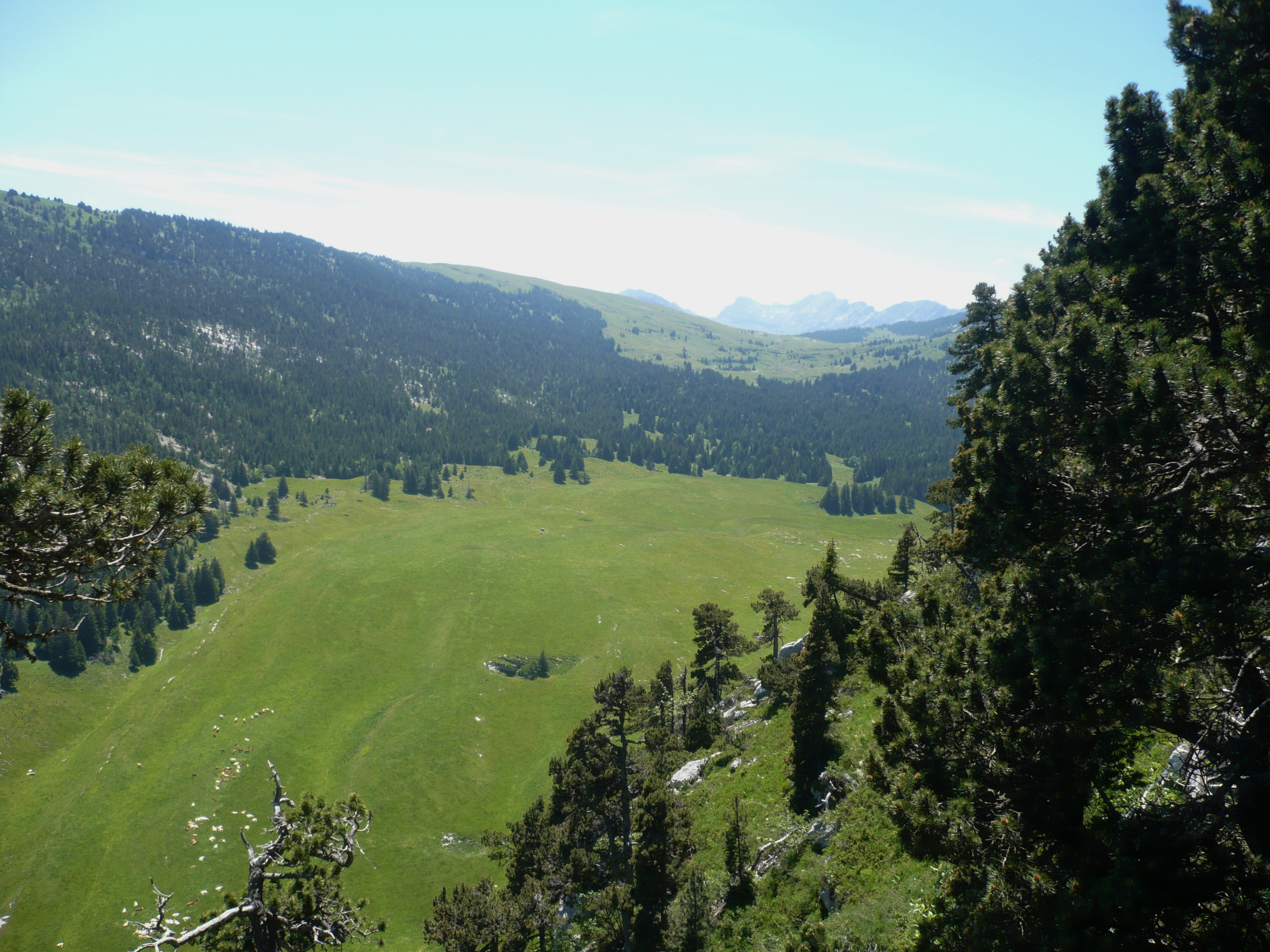

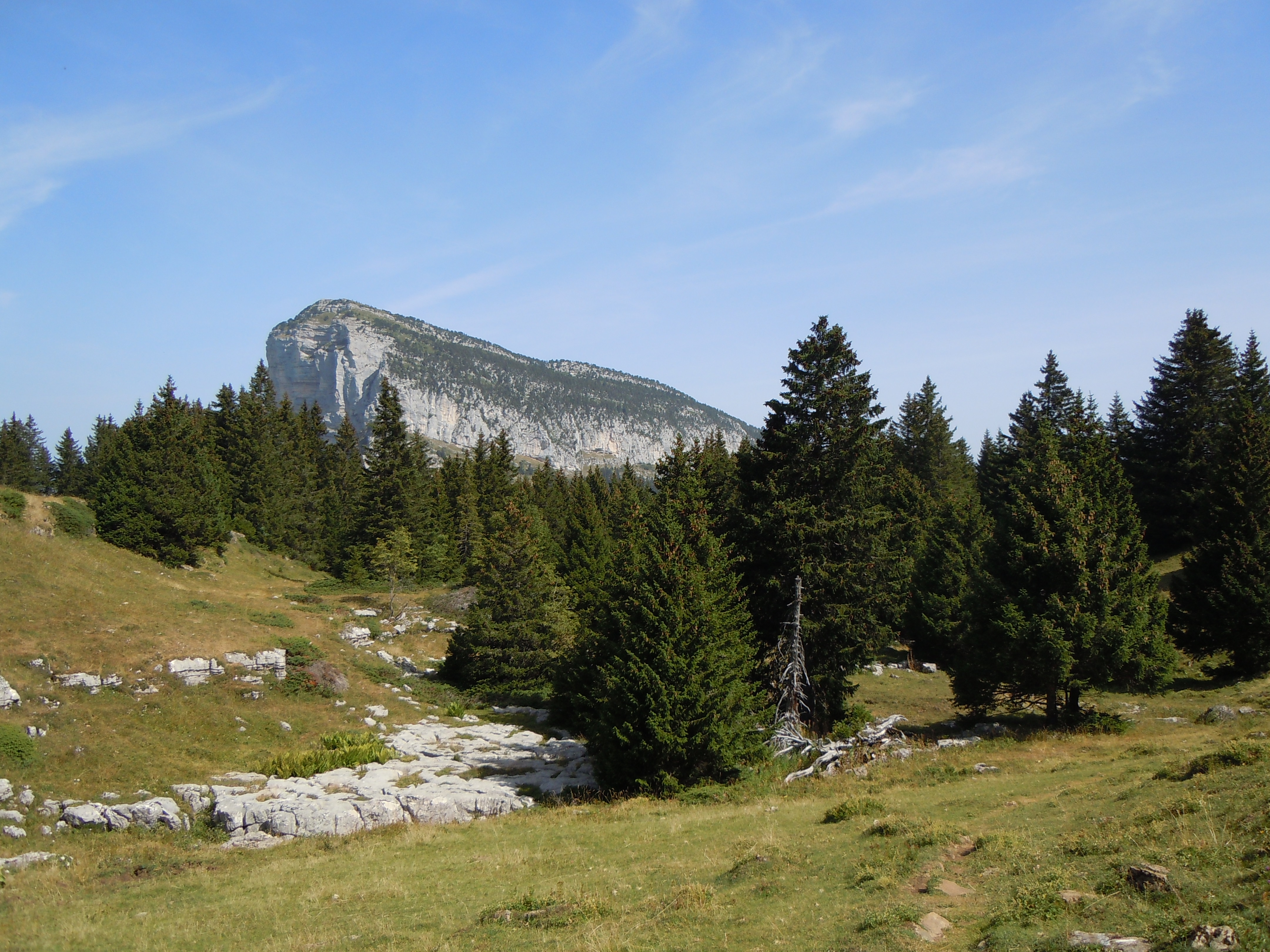
Mont Granier

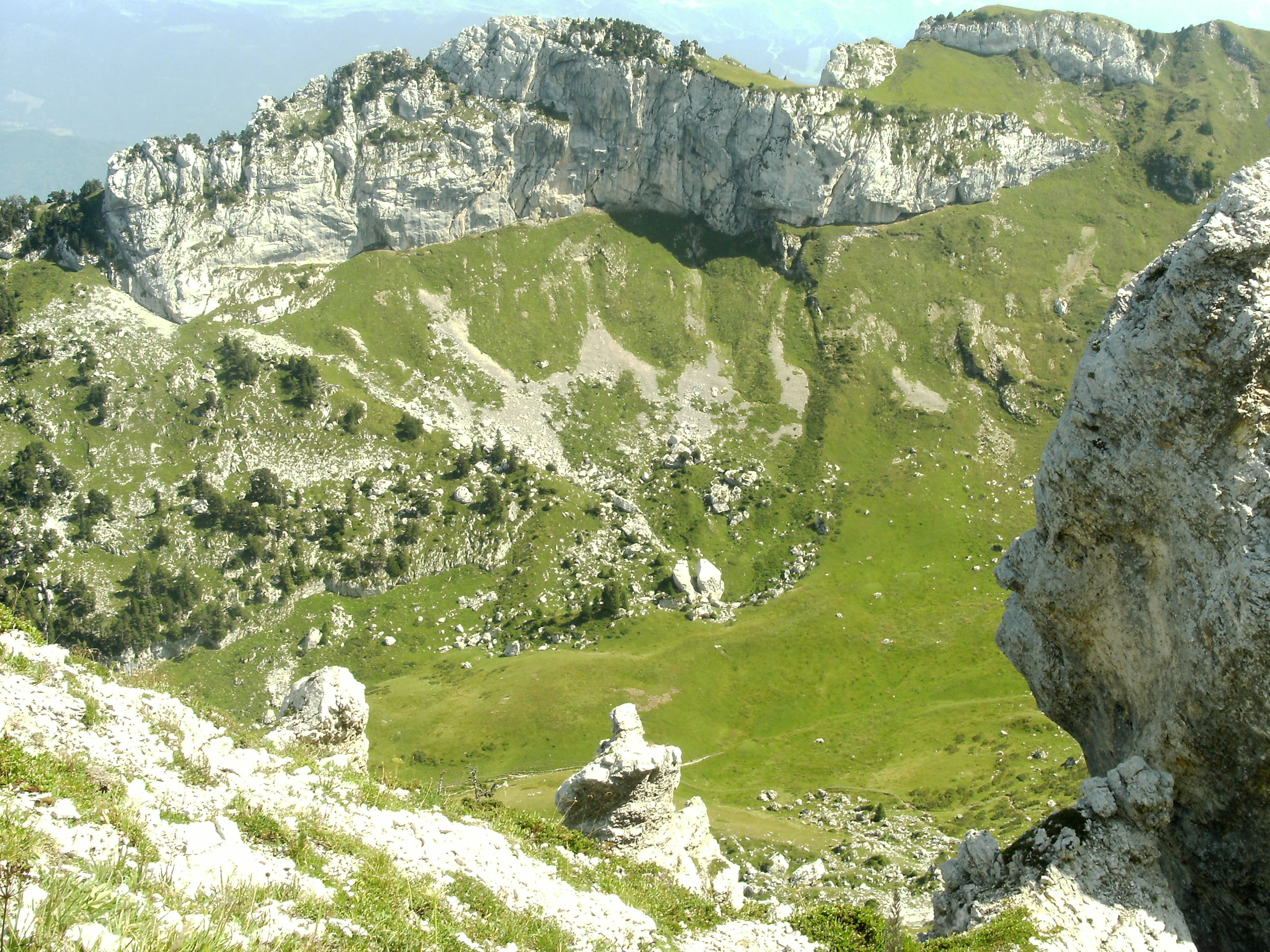
Geological formations

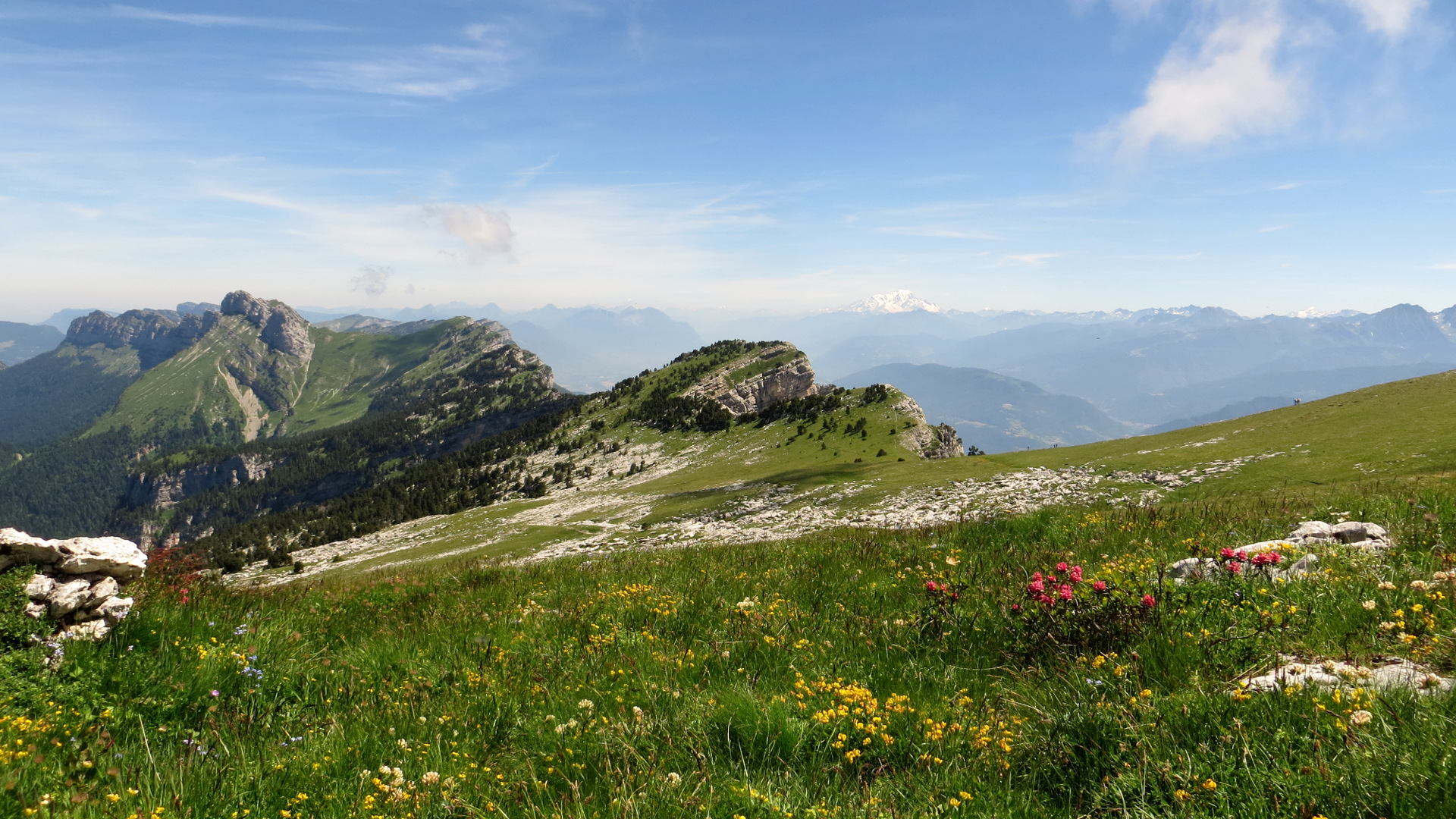
Montane meadows

== See also ==
Regional nature parks of France
