= Saint-Pierre-d'Entremont, Savoie =

Saint-Pierre-d'Entremont San Pirè (Savoyard)
- Commune
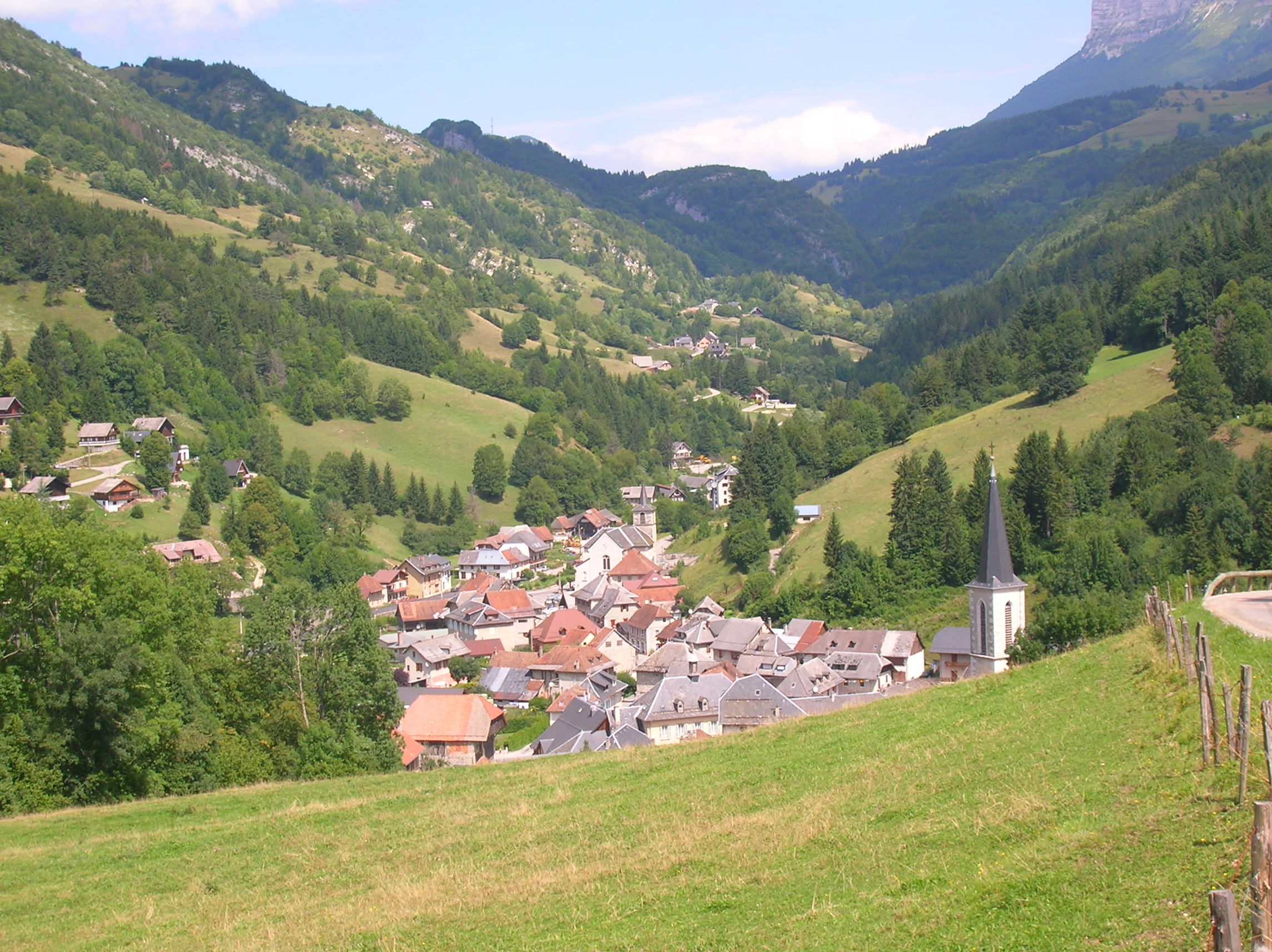
- A general view of Saint-Pierre-d'Entremont, Savoie
- Location of Saint-Pierre-d'Entremont
- Location within France Location within Auvergne-Rhône-Alpes
- Coordinates: 45°24′58″N 5°51′17″E
- Country: France
- Region: Auvergne-Rhône-Alpes
- Department: Savoie
- Arrondissement: Chambéry
- Canton: Le Pont-de-Beauvoisin
- Intercommunality: CC Cœur de Chartreuse

Government
  - Mayor (2020–2026): Wilfried Tissot
- Area^{1}: 32.31 km^{2} (12.47 sq mi)
- Highest elevation: 2,047 m (6,716 ft)
- Lowest elevation: 598 m (1,962 ft)
- Population (2023): 383
  - Density: 11.9/km^{2} (30.7/sq mi)
- Time zone: UTC+01:00 (CET)
  - Summer (DST): UTC+02:00 (CEST)
- INSEE/Postal code: 73274 /73670
- ^{1} French Land Register data, which excludes lakes, ponds, glaciers > 1 km^{2} (0.386 sq mi or 247 acres) and river estuaries.

Saint-Pierre-d'Entremont (French pronunciation: [sɛ̃ pjɛʁ dɑ̃tʁəmɔ̃]; Savoyard: San Pirè) is a commune in the Savoie department in the Auvergne-Rhône-Alpes region in south-eastern France.

== Geography ==
Located on the north bank of the Guiers Vif, Saint-Pierre d'Entremont in Savoie is a mountain township. Its highest point is over 1,800 meters above sea level. The village lies in the bottom of the valley (650 meters), adjacent to the Saint-Pierre-d'Entremont in Isère.

=== Neighboring townships ===
Neighboring communes of Saint-Pierre d'Entremont in Savoie are Saint-Pierre-d'Entremont in Isère, Corbel, Entremont-le-Vieux, Sainte-Marie-du-Mont, Chapareillan.

== Toponymy ==
"Savoyard" part of Saint-Pierre d'Entremont, the town takes its name from the high count of Savoie's castle.

== History ==
In the 19th century, we present the village as poor and isolated, but in the late 19th century, there was a considerable growth of the industry (including gloves industry). In the 20th century, the tourism of the town is at its peak.

A new castle was built by the Entremonts valley district at the south of the Guiers.

== Population and society ==
=== Personalities ===
- Florentine Baffert (1886- 1944), native teacher (1903–1926) to Montevideo (Uruguay) and Santa Rosa (Argentina) and Villa Brea (Italy, 1921), Superior of the Brothers of the Holy Family (1933) .
- Philippe Bron : Winner of the bumps Grading at the World Cup freestyle skiing in 1984 and 1985, and then Edgar Grospironc's coach especially during his gold medal at the Olympic Winter Games in 1992 in Albertville. That was the Olympic Games where this kind of sport was officially regarded as an Olympic discipline (excluding demos) Olympics. The "Bronco" is a figure of bump skiing invented by Philippe Bron. It is rotation of 360 ° with a standard when the skier is back to the slope. The name "Bronco" is composed of the name of its creator "Bron" and "co", contraction of helico (or helicopter), another name given to 360 ° in bump skiing.

=== Media ===
- The local radio station "Radio Couleur Chartreuse" is broadcast on 98.4 MHz or 106 MHz.

=== Sports ===
- The Tour de France passed through Saint-Pierre d'Entremont by the D912.

== Sights ==
- Chateau de Montbel (Montbel Castle) : Former castle of the tenth century, ancestral castle of the Montbel d'Entremont lords and headquarters of the lordship d'Entremont, now in ruins.
- Notre Dame room, dedicated to cinema and performing arts was built by the parishioners of the village in 1938; fully equipped since 2008 (150 seats), it hosts a share of film screenings (Saturday evening) through the partnership established in 1991 with Cinébus, traveling cinema of Savoie countries rated "Art & test" and other theatrical seasons (a professional show every 2 months) organized by the AADEC, the animation association of the Entremonts valley from 2002–2003.
- The church of Saint-Alexis dates from the nineteenth century.
- The former chapel of the Ten Thousand Martyrs: facade dates from the Middle Ages and is a listed historical monument since April 1928.
- Tour d'Inferney (Inferney Tower): this building, dating from the late fifteenth century, is the corner tower of an ancient fortified house that has today disappeared and probably occupied a strategic position on the edge of the Guiers locking the passage between Savoie and Dauphiné.
- The township also includes The Cross of the Thousand Martyrs and Neolithic remains.

== See also ==
- Communes of the Savoie department
