= Saint-Pierre-de-Chartreuse =

- Commune
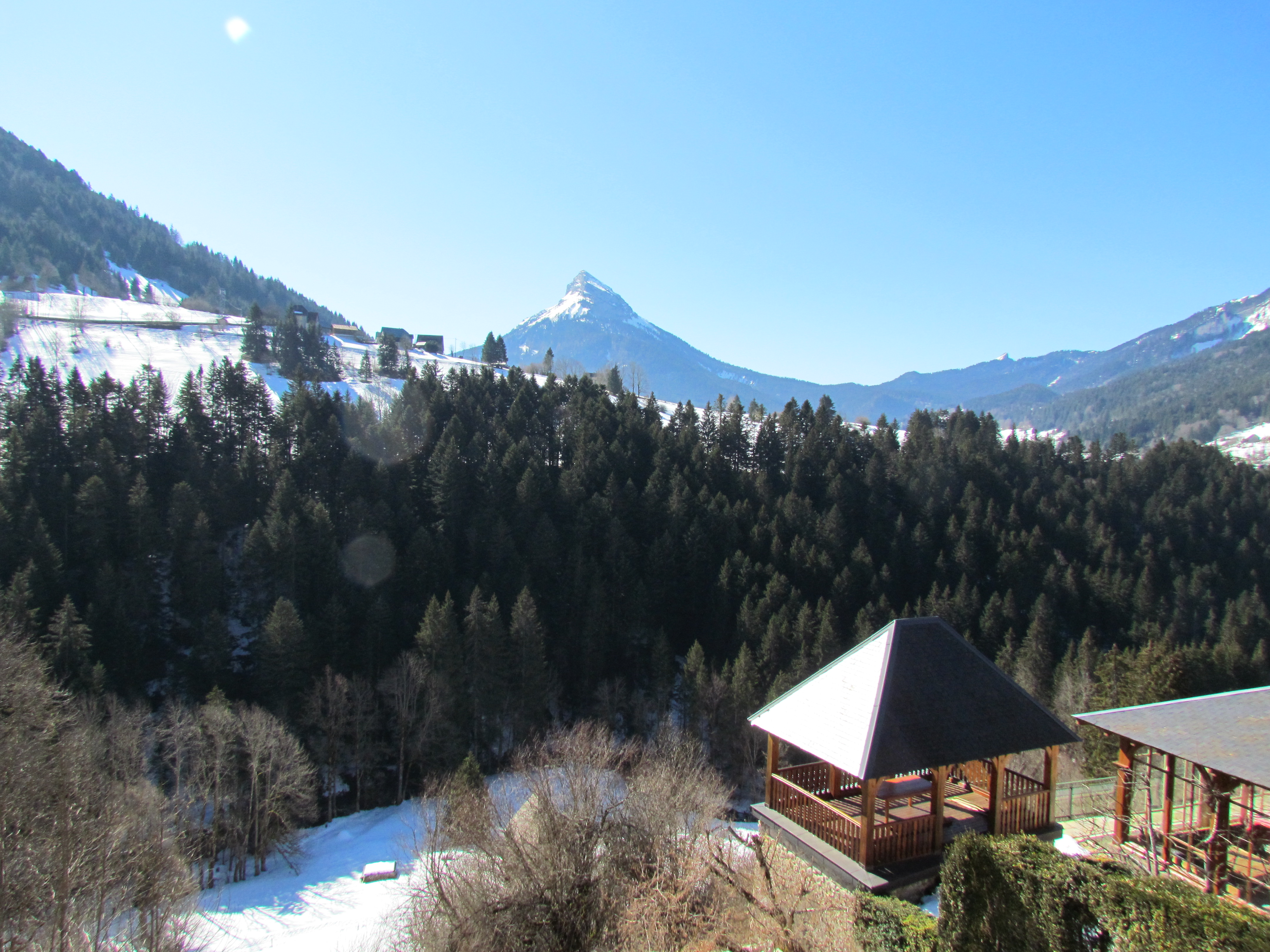
- A view of Saint-Pierre-de-Chartreuse, with the mountain of Chamechaude in the background

- Coat of arms
- Location of Saint-Pierre-de-Chartreuse
- Location within France Location within Auvergne-Rhône-Alpes
- Coordinates: 45°20′36″N 5°48′58″E
- Country: France
- Region: Auvergne-Rhône-Alpes
- Department: Isère
- Arrondissement: Grenoble
- Canton: Chartreuse-Guiers
- Intercommunality: Cœur de Chartreuse

Government
  - Mayor (2020–2026): Stéphane Gusmeroli
- Area^{1}: 80.12 km^{2} (30.93 sq mi)
- Elevation: 900 m (3,000 ft)
- Highest elevation: 2,079 m (6,821 ft)
- Lowest elevation: 640 m (2,100 ft)
- Population (2023): 1,003
  - Density: 12.52/km^{2} (32.42/sq mi)
- Time zone: UTC+01:00 (CET)
  - Summer (DST): UTC+02:00 (CEST)
- INSEE/Postal code: 38442 /38380
- ^{1} French Land Register data, which excludes lakes, ponds, glaciers > 1 km^{2} (0.386 sq mi or 247 acres) and river estuaries.

Saint-Pierre-de-Chartreuse (French pronunciation: [sɛ̃ pjɛʁ də ʃaʁtʁøz]) is a commune in the Isère department in the Auvergne-Rhône-Alpes region in southeastern France.

It is located in the Chartreuse Mountains, to the north of the city of Grenoble. The Grande Chartreuse, the head monastery of the Carthusian order is located in Saint-Pierre-de-Chartreuse.

== Geography ==
The village is located in the heart of the Chartreuse Mountains 25 kilometers north of Grenoble.

== Etymology ==
The village was earlier known as Catorissium, Cantourisa, Caturissium, and Chatrousse. The name is of Gaulish origin; and is perhaps related to the name of the Caturiges tribe.

== History ==
The village is mentioned in the Tabula Peutingeriana under the name Catorissium, and in the Ravenna Cosmography as Cantourisa.

When St. Bruno and his six companions settled near Chartrousse in June 1084 on the indication of Bishop Hugues de Grenoble, they took the name of the nearby village and latinized it in Cartusia.

== Population ==
Historical population
Year	Pop.	±% p.a.
1968	641	—
1975	565	−1.79%
1982	563	−0.05%
1990	650	+1.81%
1999	770	+1.90%
2007	901	+1.98%
2012	1,009	+2.29%
2017	1,015	+0.12%
2023	1,003	−0.20%
Source: INSEE

== Media ==
- Local television: France 3 Alpes
- Local radio stations: Radio Couleur Chartreuse

== Economy ==
=== Early 20th century ===
Saint-Pierre-de-Chartreuse has lived of agriculture for a long time, like other mountain villages, and also of the wood trade, the forest being composed primarily of conifers. In the early 20th century, tourism took an important place, including the construction of the 'Grand Som' luxury hotel that hosted famous guests including Queen Victoria of the United Kingdom.

The village was rated weather resort in the 1930s and people came here to recharge, visit the monastery of the Grande Chartreuse (which was open to the public between 1903 at the expulsion of the monks to 1940 at their return from Italy).

It was also at St. Pierre that created first "Syndicat d'initiative" of France, now best known under the name "Office du Tourisme" (tourist information center) and thanks to an Alsatian called Leon Auscher, who had adopted this country that was so dear to him.

Between the wars, many families in the village engage in the hotel, the number of travellers grew. During this period, the first lift was born in the form of a sleigh pulled by a winch. The 1950s drove to the installation of the first teleported: the "télébenne".

=== Since 1970 ===
The ski resort experienced the glory days of winter sports in the 1970s, and after suffering "years without snow" in the 1980s and early 1990s, it is currently experiencing a second wind. Snow is sometimes random and allows seasons of no more than three months, but the resort's strategic location near major urban centres (including Grenoble), the approximation of the neighboring station Planolet, the family atmosphere, and the affordable prices made it experience in 2005 and 2006 its largest turnover in terms of selling packages.

Winter sports (mainly alpine skiing but Nordic skiing or snowshoeing) relate to the heart of the area, with 90 million euros per year, and they provide work to a large number of Chartroussins.

Crafts are not left out, and the village is home to masons, stonecutters and carpenters.

Tourism plays a prominent role in Chartreuse Massif and the area. Many visitors come to discover the Grande Chartreuse monastery founded by St. Bruno in 1084 and especially the Museum of the Grande Chartreuse at the Correrie dedicated to it: 60,000 visitors a year.

Shops include a bakery, butchery, supermarket, pharmacy, newsagent, cheese, bars, hotels, restaurants, sports shops and salon.

== Personalities ==
- The painter Arcabas made paintings that are in the church of Saint-Hugues-de-Chartreuse, the second hamlet.
- Guy Lafond, son of the former mayor and brother of former motorcycle champion who is a woodcarver.
- Jacques Brel lived in Saint-Pierre-de-Chartreuse. You can see his house on the edges of the ski slopes. In tribute to the great singer, a festival of French musicians called "Les rencontres Brel" (Brel meetings) takes place every summer in a large tent erected in the middle of the central square.
- Paul Touvier was employed as a secretary by the monastery of the Grande Chartreuse in 1972 under the name of Paul Berthet (that was the name of his wife). It was under this name that the inhabitants of the village, including former resistant, knew him as well as Jacques Brel, whose he was the impresario.

== Events ==
- Race ski mountaineering "The Cross Chamechaude" in early March.
- Mountain trail, Le Grand Duc, race taking place the last weekend of June or first of July, sponsored by the company Raidlight located in the town.
- The eco-festival of French songs "The Brel meeting" takes place every year in mid-July.
- An international sculpture competition existed in conjunction with the Brel meetings.
- A film festival of sculpture, Images sculpture exists since 2004 In 2006, in May and June, Cornelia Konrads, a German artist in residence, created a work in situ, near the river, in the village.
- In 2007, the sculptor Jean-Michel Moreau made an ephemeral work in sand, Fractal II, in the huge barn located inside the Grande Chartreuse museum. On the site of the event, you can watch a film about the realization of the sand sculpture.
- "The battle of Eringer cows" takes place every year on the first Sunday of August. Farmers present their Eringer cows. They compete in a free and fair fights. After a fierce and natural fight, will be elected "Queen of Hérens de Chartreuse."
- In mid-September instead Heritage Days with a special program for youth at the Museum of the Grande Chartreuse.

== Sports ==
=== Ski ===
The Saint Pierre de Chartreuse / Le Planolet ski resorts include: 35 km of slopes, 4 black, 9 red, 5 blue and 6 green. 14 lifts, 1 gondola, 3 chairlifts and 10 lifts. The top of the resort is located at La Scia at 1791 m altitude. The bottom of the station is situated 900 m, a drop of almost 900 m.

Depending on snow conditions, the resort features a snowpark (located on the old departure of the chairlift Battour), and various spots on the Scia (Big Air in the first ledge and various bumps on the last run of the track).

You can access the station in three places. St Pierre de Chartreuse village, Combe de l'ourse chairlift parking, or Le planolet. on weekdays outside of school holidays, often combe de l'ourse is closed.

=== Trail-Running ===
The area surrounding St Pierre de Chartreuse is becoming increasingly popular as a trail-running destination, with several marked trails of varying length and difficulty. The ultra-running race "Le Grand Duc" (named after the Eagle Owl which is the symbol of the Parc Régional Naturel de Chartreuse) starts and ends in the village with a route which varies each edition.

== Sights ==
- The Musée de la Grande Chartreuse, just 2 km from the famous monastery founded by St. Bruno this unique site to better understand the mystery of the Carthusian Order, their 900-year history, lifestyle, cut off from the world and locked in the silence. Resolutely modern, the museum housed in a former dependency of Carthusian monks, opens the door to their spiritual journey and invites you to discover the "Great Silence".
- The Church of Saint-Hugues-de-Chartreuse, St. Hugues, is unique because it houses the Museum of Contemporary Sacred Art, which exposes 111 works by the painter Arcabas.
- At the village limits on its west side, the forest house of the Col de la Charmette is a typical forest architecture of the nineteenth century The construction of this imposing building dates back to 1862. According to historical periods, the activity of the lodge was linked either to logging or tourism. The Office National des Forêts (National Forestry Office) has decided to sell the building in 2010. A partnership was formed so that this place can continue to be open to the public.

== See also ==
- Communes of the Isère department
