= Château des Marches =

Castle in Les Marches, Savoie, France

- Les Marches, Savoie, Auvergne-Rhône-Alpes, France
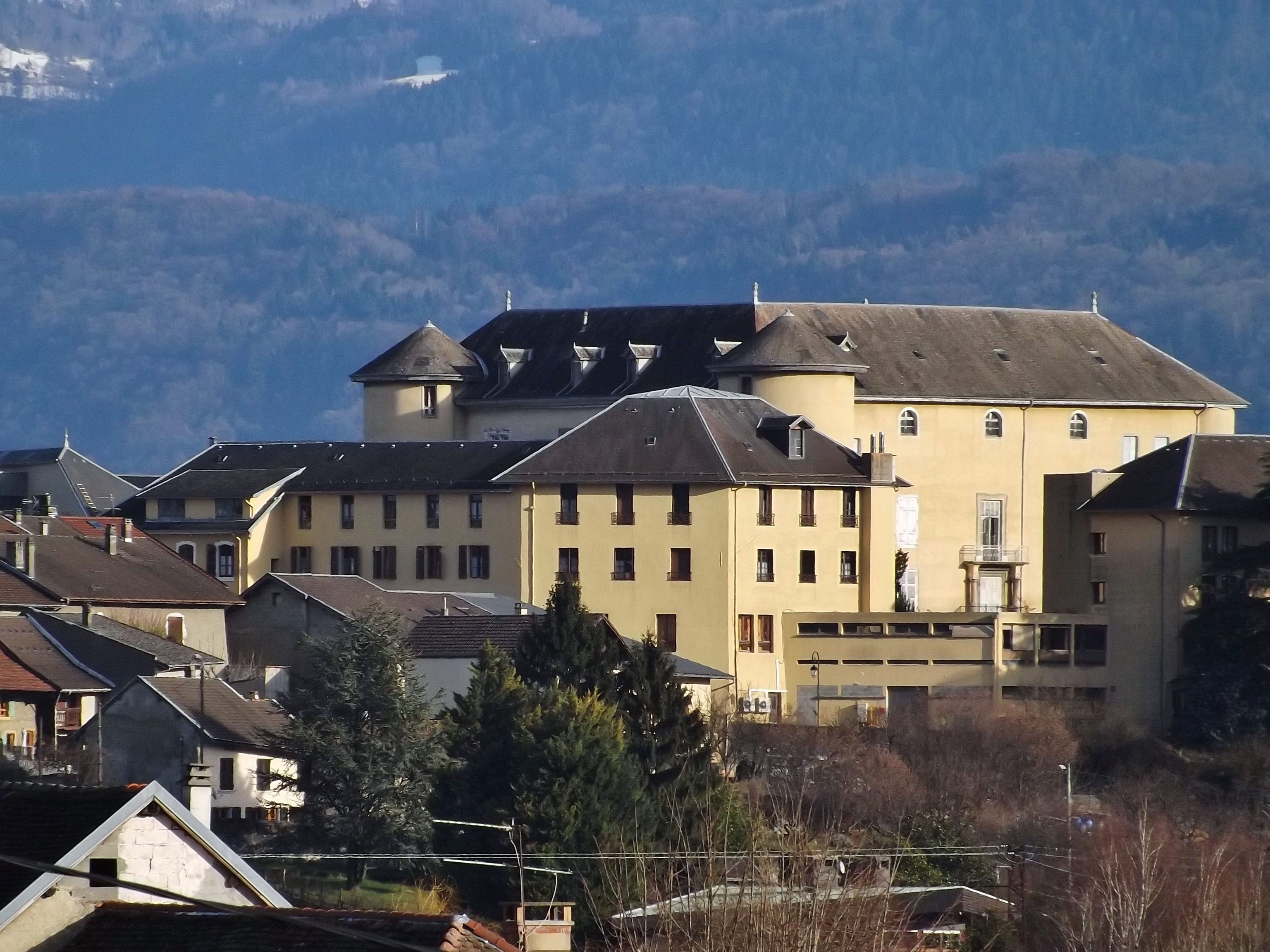
- The castle seen from Saint-André Lake.

Site information
- Type: Fortified house

Location
- Coordinates: 45.497222°N 6.002778°E

Site history
- Built: Early 14th century
- Built for: House of Savoy

The Château des Marches, originally known as de Murs, is a former fortified house from the 14th century, extensively remodeled during the Renaissance, located in the Combe de Savoie on the border of Savoy and Dauphiné in the present-day commune of Les Marches, in the Savoie department of the Auvergne-Rhône-Alpes region of France.

== Location ==
The Château des Marches is situated in the French department of Savoie, in the commune of Les Marches, within the village, approximately 300 metres (980 ft) south of the church on a hillock overlooking the Isère valley. Positioned at the boundary of the County of Savoy and Dauphiné, the castle protected Chambéry and the western part of the county. It controlled the routes from Chambéry to Lyon via Les Échelles, from Geneva to Grenoble through the Isère valley, and the road to Italy via Montmélian.

== History ==
The Château des Marches forms an integral part of the defensive line established by the Counts of Savoy starting with Amadeus V, who built a wooden castle on a motte at this site in 1301–1302. Aymon the Peaceful rebuilt it in stone starting in 1342, and his son, Amadeus VI, the Green Count, completed the construction.

Its earliest lords were Guillaume de Cordon in 1346, Rodolphe de Cordon in 1359, and Guillaume de Cordon in 1392.

Count Amadeus VIII of Savoy granted it as a fief, along with Montbel, in February 1403 until 1418 to Aymon de La Balme, lord of Apremont, who already held the Château d'Apremont and delegated its custody to Portier de Chignin. From 1418 to 1422, it was held by Guigues de la Balme, then by Guigonne de la Balme, Aymon’s heir, from 1422 to 1442. Guigonne, who married Gaspard II de Montmayeur in 1417, was permitted in 1440 to adopt the name des Marches.

On 21 August 1421, Catherine de La Ravoire, lady of Silans and des Marches, widow of Aymon de La Balme, designated her grandson Jacques de Montmayeur, son of Gaspard and Guigonne, as heir.

The castle passed by inheritance to the Savoyard Montmayeur family, who held it until 1486. They built a chapel dedicated to Saint Michael. The castle was managed by Gaspard II de Montmayeur, Marshal of Savoy, and Jacques de Montmayeur, also Marshal of Savoy, who held it until 1486, delegating its management to Jean de Médici from 1482 to 1483 and Aymon Panice from 1485 to 1486. Upon Jacques de Montmayeur’s death in March 1487, per an act dated 27 August 1486, Duke Charles I of Savoy assigned the castellany to Gilberte de Polignac, niece of Marshal Jacques de Montmayeur and wife of Anthelme de Miolans, Marshal of Savoy. Successive lords included Anthelme de Miolans, knight, from 1486 to 1489; Jacques II de Miolans from 1489 to 1496, who employed Claude Ruffi, a Montmélian bourgeois, from 1493 to 1494; D. Claude-Jacques de Miolans, knight, from 1496 to 1497; Louis de Miolans, knight, from 1497 to 1513, with Gaspard de la Challandière as steward in 1502; and Jacques III de Miolans, knight, from 1513 to 1523.

The lordship of Les Marches was elevated to a county in 1491 and united with the fief of Montmayeur.

Upon Jacques III de Miolans’ death in 1523, the castle passed to his sister Claude (or Claudine) de Miolans, wife of Guillaume de Poitiers, brother of Diane de Poitiers. Duke Charles III negotiated with Claude to repurchase the lands of Les Marches and Entremont with an option to redeem the fief. In 1526, Beatrice of Portugal, Duchess of Savoy, received it in exchange for Caramagne (Piedmont) and sold it in 1531 for 3,000 écus to François Noyel de Bellegarde, plenipotentiary minister of the Duke of Savoy at the court of Charles V. The Noyel (Noël) de Bellegarde family were lords of Les Marches and Entremont from 1531 to 1830.

The castle was held by François Noyel, son of Jean Noyel, from 1531 to 1556. Claude du Verger, esquire, lord of Les Marches, paid feudal homage to the Duke of Savoy in 1542. Jean François I Noyel de Bellegarde held it from 1556 to 1623.

In 1600, Henry IV stayed there from 16 to 18 August during the Siege of Montmélian.

Claude André Noyel de Bellegarde managed it in 1623, succeeded by Guillaume, then Jean-François II de Bellegarde, governor of Fort Barraux, until 1663.

Janus Noyel de Bellegarde, first president of the Senate of Savoy, chancellor of the King of Sardinia, held it from 1663 to 1712, and saw the county elevated to a marquisate in June 1682 or 1688. Successors included Jean-François III from 1712 to 1742, Dom Joseph François from 1742 to 1759, and François Eugène Robert de Bellegarde from 1759 until his death in 1790. The latter, a general born in London in 1720, marquis of Les Marches and Cursinge, in the service of the Netherlands and retired in Chambéry, extensively restored the castle and built the ballroom. Married to Mademoiselle d’Hervilly, who died at 23, he had three daughters: Adélaïde-Victoire (born 1772), Césarine-Lucie (born 1774), and Françoise-Aurore-Éléonore (born 1776). In 1787, he married his eldest daughter, Adèle, aged fifteen, to Frédéric de Bellegarde, a nephew or cousin, a colonel in the Sardinian army stationed in Chambéry. From this union, a son was born in 1791 and a daughter. Frédéric, with his wife Adèle, their son, and sister-in-law Aurore, fled to Piedmont during the French occupation of Savoy.

On the night of 21–22 September 1792, the Sardinian army retreated to Piedmont without combat as French revolutionary troops, led by Marquis Anne-Pierre de Montesquiou-Fézensac, known as General Montesquiou, were welcomed by the Savoyard people. (Note: Joseph de Maistre noted in his diaries: "Infamous flight of the troops. Treason or stupidity of the generals, an incredible and somewhat mysterious rout according to some...")

The Château des Marches is noted in Savoy as the site of the only act of resistance during this invasion: Colonel Charles-François de Buttet, an artillery officer of King Victor Amadeus III, set up a battery of six cannons—two on the castle terrace, two on the lower level, and two facing Chapareillan. This resistance was overcome by Marshal de Camp Laroque with 12 infantry companies, 12 pickets, 400 foot chasseurs, and 200 dragoons.

Montesquiou lodged in the deserted castle on 22 September 1792.

In November 1792, sisters Adèle, then twenty, and Aurore, sixteen, reclaimed the castle. Embracing revolutionary ideas, they hosted Jacobins, including General Kellermann, and organized balls and festivities. Their eventful lives were recounted in 1904 by Ernest Daudet in Le Roman d'un conventionnel. Hérault de Séchelles et les dames de Bellegarde, d'après des documents inédits.

Frédéric-Pierre de Bellegarde, chamberlain to the Austrian emperor and son of Frédéric and Adèle, sold the castle in 1831 to Count Camille Costa de Beauregard following his mother’s death in Paris in 1830.

Michel Costa de Beauregard, Camille’s grandson, sold the castle in 1882 to his cousin, a canon, before entering holy orders. With his sister Alix (1847–1915), a nun of the Charity of Saint Vincent de Paul, he founded a girls’ orphanage, which housed 72 girls by 1914. Ernest Costa donated the castle to the Daughters of Charity. It served as a military hospital during both world wars (1914–1918 and 1939–1940).

The orphanage became a domestic science school in 1950 and a retirement home in 1972, with 90 beds as of 2009.

== Description ==
The Château des Marches has undergone numerous renovations, likely during the Renaissance and on the eve of the French Revolution.

Originally built in the 14th century at the promontory’s end facing potential attackers, it featured a quadrangular enclosure measuring 30 metres (98 ft) wide and 40 metres (130 ft) long. Two parallel residential blocks, one facing north toward Chambéry and the other southwest toward the Isère, were connected by a 1.60 metres (5 ft 3 in)-thick high wall surrounding an inner courtyard. The northwest façade was flanked by two round corner towers, now reduced to roof height, which protected the 15th-century entrance. These towers were lit by mullioned windows. Overlooking the castle terraces, the opposite façade, pierced with numerous windows, was flanked by two pepperbox turrets in corbels, allowing surveillance of the valley. The ramparts and mullioned windows, except for the entrance façade, were likely removed in the 16th century under the Bellegarde family, who transformed the fortress into a pleasure castle.

Today, the castle consists of three U-shaped buildings. Facing Mont Granier, the remaining wall, pierced with narrow openings, connects to the gardens via a Louis XVI-style door-window. The northeast façade, cleared after the wall’s removal and opening toward the Bauges plateau, features an Italianate peristyle with Louis XVI marble columns leading to the ballroom.

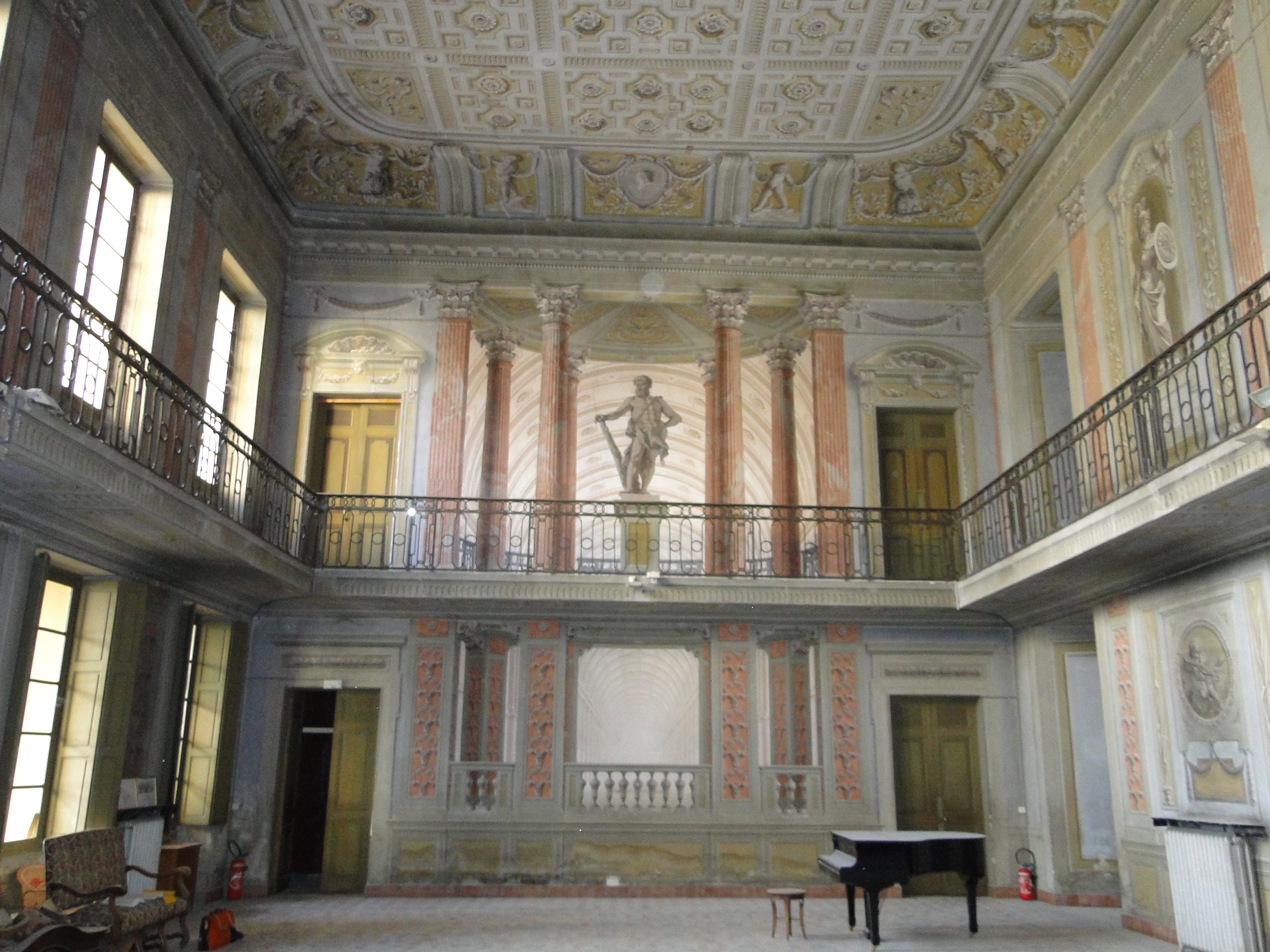
Mural paintings in the ballroom

The ballroom, built by Eugène de Bellegarde between 1780 and 1790, measures 18 metres (59 ft) long, 14 metres (46 ft) wide, and 10 metres (33 ft) high over two stories. A Louis XVI wrought-iron gallery encircles the room at mid-level. The room opens to the garden via the Louis XVI door-window and two windows, and to the inner courtyard via four windows and a door.

Its interior decoration, crafted by the Galliari brothers, features trompe-l'œil paintings covering the walls of both stories and the ceiling. The ceiling mimics coffers, while the walls depict pilasters, columns, paneling, doors, balustrades, and perspectives of galleries and rotundas. The gallery walls are adorned with imitation statues of Hercules, Mars, Diana, and Bellona, with medallions portraying the marquis and his three daughters.

These late-18th-century Galliari decorative paintings were classified as a heritage object on 1 April 1952. They underwent conservation and restoration in 2012 and 2013, enabling the ballroom’s reopening to the public.

A wall punctuated by flanking towers once enclosed the castle and the borough of Les Marches. Access to the fortified borough was through a gate defended by three cylindrical towers topped with machicolations. Founded by Amadeus V in 1301, the current village retains one gate from its enclosure, and remnants of walls and round towers are visible toward Montmélian.

== Castellany of Les Marches ==
The Château des Marches was the seat of a castellany, or mandement (mandamentum), in the early 14th century, established in 1301 during the conflict with the neighboring Dauphiné. It was created from the division of the Castellany of Montmélian.

The territory included the villages (or parishes) of Pierre Grosse (now part of Apremont), Myans, Saint-André, and Les Marches.

In the County of Savoy’s organization, the castellan was an "officer, appointed for a fixed term, revocable, and removable, always a loyal servant. The castellan managed the castellany, collected fiscal revenues, and maintained the castle. The role was multifaceted (judicial, financial, and military), often assisted by a receiver of accounts who prepared annual reports.

Castellany accounts preserved at the Savoie Departmental Archives cover 1339–1494.

=== Castellans of Les Marches, 14th to 15th century ===
- 1301: Hugues de Chandée, Bailli of Savoy, also Castellan of Montmélian
- 1304: Mermet de Saint-Jean d'Arvey
- 1305: Pierre de Villeneuve
- 10 March 1340–24 February (July) 1341: Jean-Loup, castellan and receiver
- 1340–1341: Jean-Loup
- 1356: Pierre de Montfalon and Cognard de Verdun
- January 1363–16 July 1364: Jean de Verdun, known as Coccard
- (1379)–17 August 1392–12 July 1398: Pierre de Fontaine du Creux (de Fonte de Croso)
- 12 July 1398–16 February 1403: Hugues Rode
- 1403–1417: La Balme d'Apremont
- 1417: Montmayeur, through marriage with Gaspard II de Montmayeur, Marshal of Savoy
  - 25 December 1482–25 December 1483: Jean de Medici, castellan and receiver of Les Marches and Apremont, for Count Jacques de Montmayeur, lord of said places
  - 25 December 1485–25 December 1486: Aymon Panice, receiver, for Count Jacques de Montmayeur, lord of said places
  - 25 December 1493–25 December 1494: Claude Ruffi, Montmélian bourgeois, castellan and receiver, for Claude Jacques de Miolans, Count of Montmayeur, heir of Jacques de Montmayeur

== See also ==
- House of Savoy
- List of motte-and-bailey castles
- County of Savoy
- Castellany
- Dauphiné

== Bibliography ==
- Paillard, Phillipe (1984). Histoire des communes savoyardes [History of Savoyard Communes] (PDF) (in French). pp. 300–303. Archived from the original (PDF) on December 29, 2016.
- Brocard, Michèle (1995). Les châteaux de Savoie [The Castles of Savoy] (PDF). Sites et Villages (in French). Yens-sur-Morges: Éditions Cabédita. pp. 168–170. ISBN 978-2-88295-142-7.
- Chapier, Georges (2005). Châteaux Savoyards: Faucigny, Chablais, Tarentaise, Maurienne, Savoie propre, Genevois [Savoyard Castles: Faucigny, Chablais, Tarentaise, Maurienne, Proper Savoy, Genevois]. L'amateur Averti (in French). Éditions La Découvrance. pp. 216–222. ISBN 978-2-84265-326-2.
- Garlatti, Ghislain (2006). Histoire des Marches: à l'ombre du Granier, chronique d'un village de Savoie [History of Les Marches: In the Shadow of Granier, Chronicle of a Savoy Village]. Les Savoisiennes (in French). Montmélian: La Fontaine de Siloé. ISBN 978-2-84206-343-6.

== Archives ==
- "Les Marches" (PDF). Inventaire-Index des comptes de châtellenie et de subsides, Comptes des châtellenies. Chambéry: Savoie Departmental Archives. p. 378. Archived (PDF) from the original on June 3, 2021.
