= Col de la Cluse =

Mountain pass in France

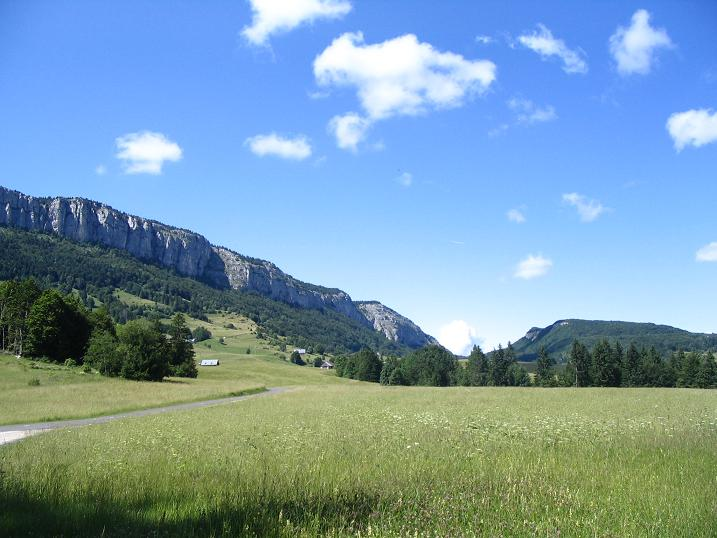
- From the Col de la Cluse, view on the Mont Outheran and Col du Mollard

- Location within France
- Elevation: 1,169 metres (3,835 ft)
- Traversed by: D45

Third Approach
- Location: Savoie, France
- Range: Alps
- Coordinates: 45°27′14″N 5°51′33″E

The Col de la Cluse (French pronunciation: [kɔl də la klyz]) is a mountain pass located 1,169 m above sea level in the Chartreuse Mountains. It connects Le Désert d'Entremont (commune of Entremont-le-Vieux) to Corbel, Savoie, France. The main road of the pass is the D45.

In winter, It is a departure to the cross country ski slopes. In summer, it is the start of a two-hour hike to access to Roche Veyrand (1,429 m), overlooking Saint-Pierre d'Entremont in Savoie. The nearby Roc de Gleisin can also be reached. It is one of the access roads to the Col du Grapillon, to the east.
