= Mont Joigny =

Mountain in Savoie, France

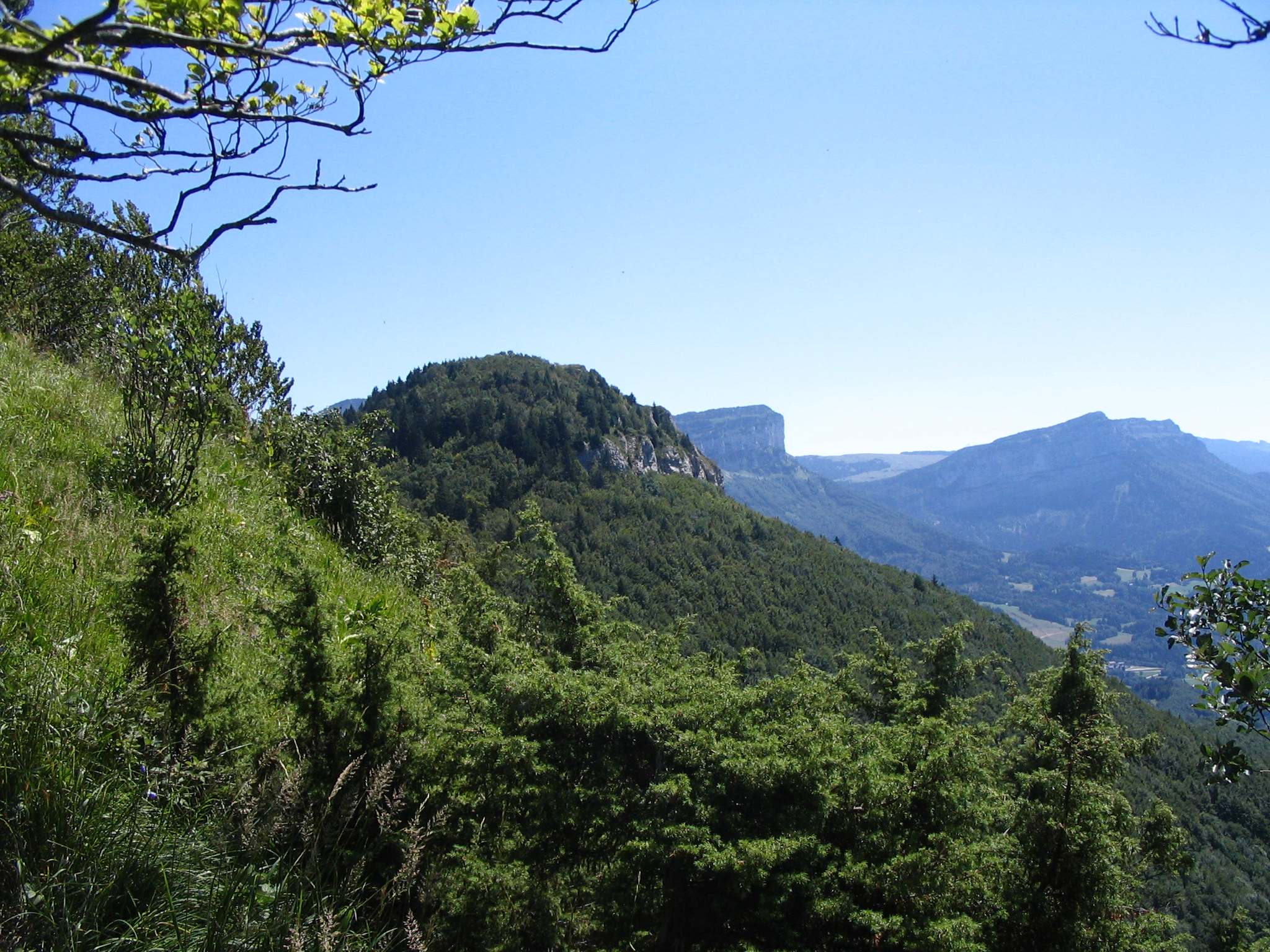
- Mont Joigny from the pointe de la Gorgeat

Highest point
- Elevation: 1,558 m (5,112 ft)
- Coordinates: 45°29′30″N 05°53′52″E

Geography
- Location within France
- Location: Savoie, France
- Parent range: Chartreuse Mountains

Mont Joigny (1,558 m) is a mountain in the Chartreuse Mountains in Savoie, France. It lies west of the Col du Granier and north of Entremont-le-Vieux.
