= History of Savoy (1792–1815) =

Duchy of Savoy history

In 1792, the Duchy of Savoy entered the revolutionary period with the arrival and occupation by the Legion of the Allobroges. The historical region experienced a situation similar to that of the French provinces. It became the Department of Mont-Blanc, with its capital in the former ducal capital, Chambéry. With the occupation of Geneva, the northern part of the duchy was separated in 1798 to form the Department of Léman. The duchy recovered its princes with the restoration in 1814 and then again in 1815.

== Savoy before 1792 ==
From 1789, the Duchy of Savoy, part of the Kingdom of Sardinia, was influenced by the French Revolution through Savoyard emigrants in Paris and Lyon. These emigrants corresponded with their homeland, sharing news of revolutionary events and ideas. In Paris, François Amédée Doppet, born in Chambéry and elected deputy for Isère in 1791, advocated for Savoy's annexation to France. In July 1792, he contributed to forming the Legion of the Allobroges, a volunteer military unit, and was appointed lieutenant colonel. In Chambéry, the arrival of emigrants fleeing the French Revolution exposed locals to revolutionary developments, shaping Savoy's engagement with the transformative events in France.

During the late 1780s, the Kingdom of Piedmont-Sardinia, including the Duchy of Savoy, faced economic challenges similar to those in France, with poor harvests leading to widespread rural poverty. Culturally, Savoy maintained close ties with France, exemplified by the presence of Masonic lodges in Chambéry, which attracted figures such as Joseph de Maistre. Initially engaged with revolutionary ideas, de Maistre later became a prominent counter-revolutionary thinker during the French invasion of Savoy.

In the Duchy of Savoy, part of the Kingdom of Piedmont-Sardinia, reforms beginning in 1770 aimed to abolish feudal rights, marking a progressive step compared to French laws, though peasants were required to purchase these rights. Under Victor Amadeus III, the kingdom appeared forward-thinking, but tensions emerged. The nobility grew resentful of the rising bourgeoisie, who were encroaching on their privileges, while also increasing demands on tenants. The bourgeoisie, in turn, criticized the disparity between Savoy and Piedmont, accusing the latter of monopolizing progress and the ruling dynasty of neglecting its Savoyard subjects.

== Invasion of Savoy in 1792 ==
On the night of September 21–22, 1792, the French Army of the Alps, led by Anne Pierre de Montesquiou-Fézensac and comprising approximately 15,000 troops, including the Legion of the Allobroges, invaded the Duchy of Savoy, part of the Kingdom of Piedmont-Sardinia, via Les Marches and Apremont. The Sardinian garrison in Chambéry retreated swiftly through the Bauges to Tarentaise and Piedmont via the Aosta Valley, offering little resistance. A minor defensive effort was made by Charles-François de Buttet, an artillery officer under King Victor Amadeus III, who established a battery at the Château des Marches. In his journals, Joseph de Maistre described the retreat as a “shameful flight of the troops. Treason or stupidity of the generals, incredible rout and even a bit mysterious according to some people…” Despite a period of peace between France and the Kingdom of Sardinia, tensions arose due to Sardinia’s alliance with Austria, formalized on July 25, 1792, and France’s ongoing conflict with the Austrian Empire. The French invasion aimed to preempt potential Austrian military movements through southeastern routes. The invasion also aligned with the ambitions of French Finance Minister Étienne Clavière, a Geneva native. On the day French forces entered Chambéry, a Jacobin club was established, and soon after, four commissioners, including Philibert Simond, arrived from the National Convention to organize elections for an Assembly of Communes.

== Revolutionary period, 1792–1802 ==
The Italian states in 1796, with Savoy in the Kingdom of Sardinia.

Map of the Mont Blanc department (1800)

The National Assembly of the Allobroges, also known as the Assembly of Deputies of the Communes of Savoy, convened in Chambéry’s cathedral in late October 1792. On October 26–27, it abolished key elements of the Ancien Régime, including the sovereign rights of the House of Savoy, noble privileges, feudal dues (without compensation), the tithe, and confiscated Church property. On October 29, the assembly dissolved after expressing a desire for annexation to France, contingent on preserving Savoyard religious liberties, a condition the French National Convention did not uphold. François Amédée Doppet and Philibert Simond presented the annexation request to the Convention in Paris. With support from Abbé Grégoire, the Convention decreed Savoy’s annexation on November 27, 1792, establishing it as the Department of Mont-Blanc. Four commissioners—Grégoire, Simond, Hérault de Séchelles, and Jagot—were appointed to organize the department, which was divided into seven districts: Annecy, Carouge, Chambéry, Cluses, Moûtiers, Saint-Jean-de-Maurienne, and Thonon. Between 1792 and 1793, Savoy contributed five battalions of national volunteers to France.

After Savoy’s annexation by France in 1792, a new regime was established. The bourgeoisie, especially jurists, led the movement, while the nobility who stayed in Savoy, rather than emigrating to Turin or Lausanne, remained cautious. The Church showed some cooperation, but the application of the Civil Constitution of the Clergy, subordinating the Church to the French state, caused significant friction, as seen in other French regions.

In 1793, opposition to the Civil Constitution of the Clergy sparked counter-revolutionary uprisings in Savoy, particularly in Upper Faucigny and the Thônes valley. The War of Thônes involved around 3,000 peasants who revolted in May, advancing toward Morette against French troops led by General d’Oraison. Marguerite Frichelet-Avet, accused of leading the riots, was executed in Annecy on May 18, 1793, declaring, “Long live Jesus-God, long live our king!” Jean Avrillon, a royalist leader from Grand-Bornand, was captured on May 21 and executed on May 29. Rebellious peasants were executed, and their homes burned. The uprisings aligned with Sardinian military presence in the Alps. In April 1793, King Victor Amadeus III joined the European coalition against France, launching a counteroffensive in August to retake Savoy via Faucigny, Tarentaise, Maurienne, and Briançonnais. Annecy rebelled on August 20–21, but French forces, after reorganizing, repelled the coalition. Following the Battle of Méribel on September 28, 1793, coalition troops withdrew from Faucigny.

Until 1796, the Kingdom of Piedmont-Sardinia remained in conflict with France. Following Napoleon Bonaparte’s victories, King Victor Amadeus III signed the Treaty of Paris, recognizing French sovereignty over the Duchy of Savoy and the County of Nice.

In January 1794, Antoine Louis Albitte became the representative on mission in Chambéry, succeeding Philibert Simond, who was recalled to Paris. Albitte’s administration enforced strict anti-clerical policies, deporting or executing priests, prompting many non-juring Savoyard priests to exile. Although a guillotine was set up, no executions by guillotine took place in Savoy. Simond and Hérault de Séchelles, upon returning to Paris, were executed by the Revolutionary Tribunal in April 1794 with other moderates. Albitte’s tenure ended in September 1794, after Robespierre’s fall, when Gautier de l’Ain was appointed as the new representative by the National Convention.

If Albitte fills the prisons, he also sometimes empties them—for instance, when, after observing during one of his rounds the extreme poverty in the Maurienne, he releases suspicious laborers so they can return to working the land. Gautier and the other representatives on mission sent by the Convention are more moderate.

== Religious question from 1793 until the Concordat ==
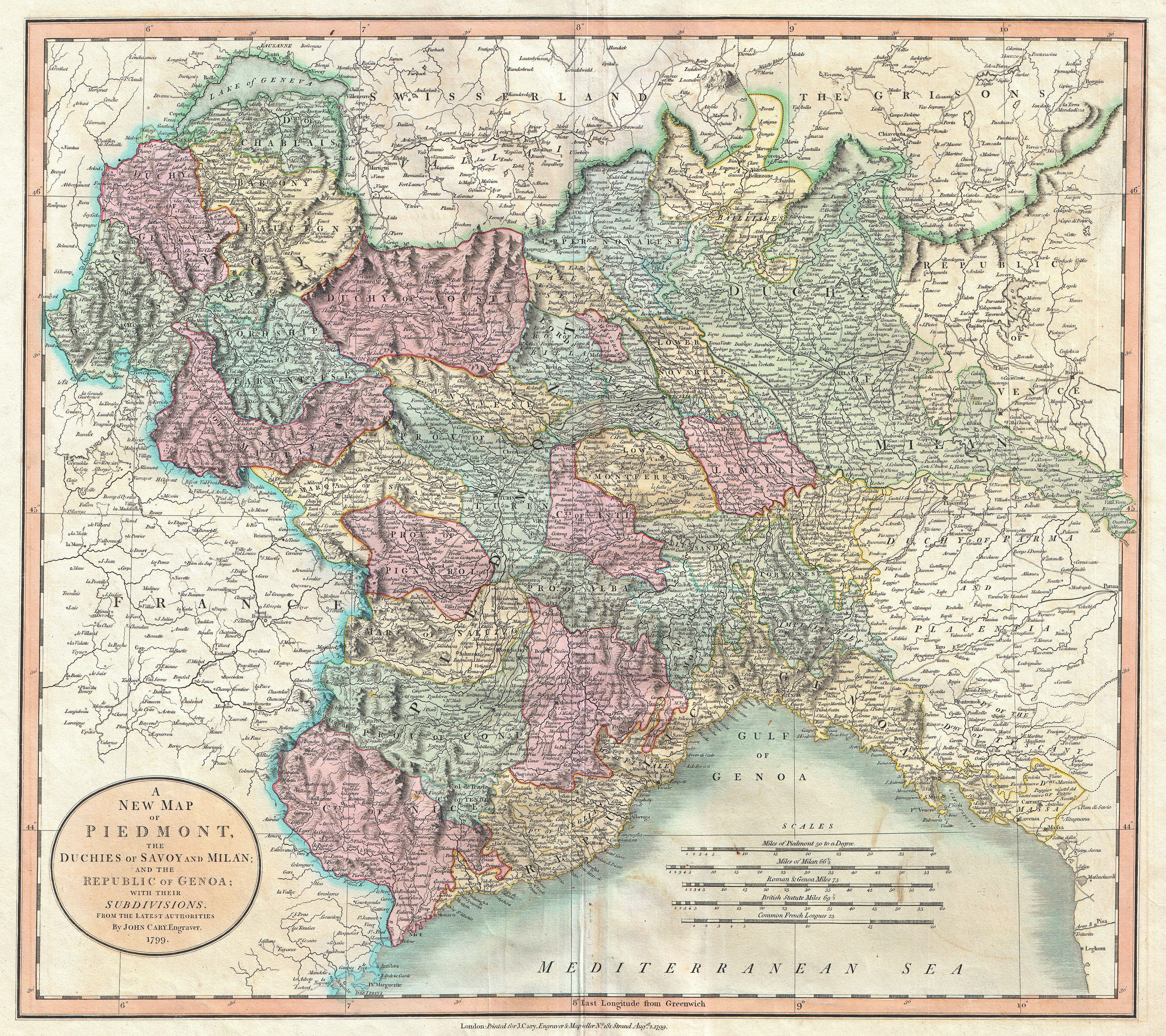
Kingdom of Sardinia in 1799.

The Civil Constitution of the Clergy, effective February 8, 1793, required priests to swear loyalty to the French state, causing religious strife in Savoy. About one-third of priests complied, with Chambéry reporting 77 oath-takers and 47 non-jurors, including the bishop. The revolutionary government’s conflict with the Church led to persecution until the Concordat of 1801. Many non-juring clergy, including the bishops of Annecy and Moûtiers, emigrated, and Chambéry’s bishop, Monsignor Conseil, was confined until his death in September 1793. By July 1794, 1,030 Savoyard clerics were émigrés. Abbé Claude-François de Thiollaz, from Lausanne, led a religious counter-revolution with Joseph de Maistre, influencing constitutional bishop Panisset to resign in February 1796. Non-juring clergy in Turin sent clandestine missionaries to conduct secret Masses, often in places like the "Curé’s Cave" in La Balme de Sillingy. Lay-led ceremonies occurred, heightened by suspicion of nearby Protestant Geneva. Some non-juring priests, like Abbé André Isnard in La Bauche, remained hidden with local support to serve their parishes.

In 1794, Antoine Louis Albitte, representative on mission in Chambéry, targeted non-juring priests ("refractories"), ordering church steeples shortened and bells melted. A priest was executed in Thonon on February 22, 1794, with a few others following. The fall of Robespierre on 9 Thermidor (July 27, 1794) halted repression of nobles and political foes, and reduced anti-clerical enforcement allowed priests greater freedom. From 1797, under the Directory, National Guard patrols intensified efforts against clandestine missionaries, deporting rather than executing priests. Of 174 Savoyard priests sent to Île de Ré and Château-d’Oléron penal colonies, only 13 reached Îles du Salut in French Guiana due to a British blockade. As the Concordat of 1801 neared, some gendarmes honored a papal envoy in Savoy, while others continued priest imprisonments.

During the French Revolution, the sale of nationalized property in Savoy, including religious items like priestly vestments, caused widespread resentment in village communities. Residents, who often produced these items, considered them communal property, and their seizure and sale were perceived as a deprivation of local heritage.

== Economic and social life ==
The abolition of seigneurial rights during the French Revolution garnered support for the Revolution and Republic in Savoy, similar to other French provinces. However, it also sparked frustration, as Savoy had been redeeming these rights since the 1770s. Those who had already paid to secure these rights felt disadvantaged by the change.

During the French Revolution, the creation of civil service positions in Savoy fostered support for the Revolution, as seen in other regions. The sale of nationalized property, spanning seven years, funded civilian and military expenditures and was a major commercial activity alongside army provisioning. Buyers in Savoy included landowning peasants expanding their plots and, predominantly, urban bourgeois, especially notaries.

== Savoie under the Empire ==
In February 1800, a referendum on the consular constitution in Savoy had low turnout, with 7,877 of 58,958 registered voters approving and 165 opposing. In 1802, 36,607 voters supported the Consulate for life, indicating approval of the consular regime’s focus on order and reconciliation.

At the end of the Directory, Savoie experienced significant unrest; however, relative stability was restored under the First French Empire, despite the continued unpopularity of Napoleonic conscription. Following a period of economic decline at the close of the 18th century—marked by a sharp population decrease in Chambéry—several years of favorable harvests contributed to economic recovery. In this context, the implementation of the Napoleonic prefectural system facilitated administrative reorganization. Trade was further stimulated by the construction of the Mont-Cenis road, which improved transalpine transport by allowing carriages to cross the pass without being dismantled.

The Concordat of 1801 contributed significantly to restoring social stability by reconciling the Catholic Church with the French state. Under its terms, the state assumed responsibility for paying the clergy, while the papacy recognized the irreversibility of the confiscation of Church property. This reassured purchasers of national property, particularly among the urban bourgeoisie, who increasingly supported the regime and adopted conservative social positions. The revolutionary period thus accelerated an existing trend of the 18th century, in which the bourgeoisie became more oriented toward landownership.

== Return to the Sardinian kingdom ==
On 20 December 1813, coalition forces entered Switzerland and advanced to Basel. Austrian troops under General Ferdinand von Bubna occupied Geneva on 30 December 1813 before proceeding to take control of Savoie.

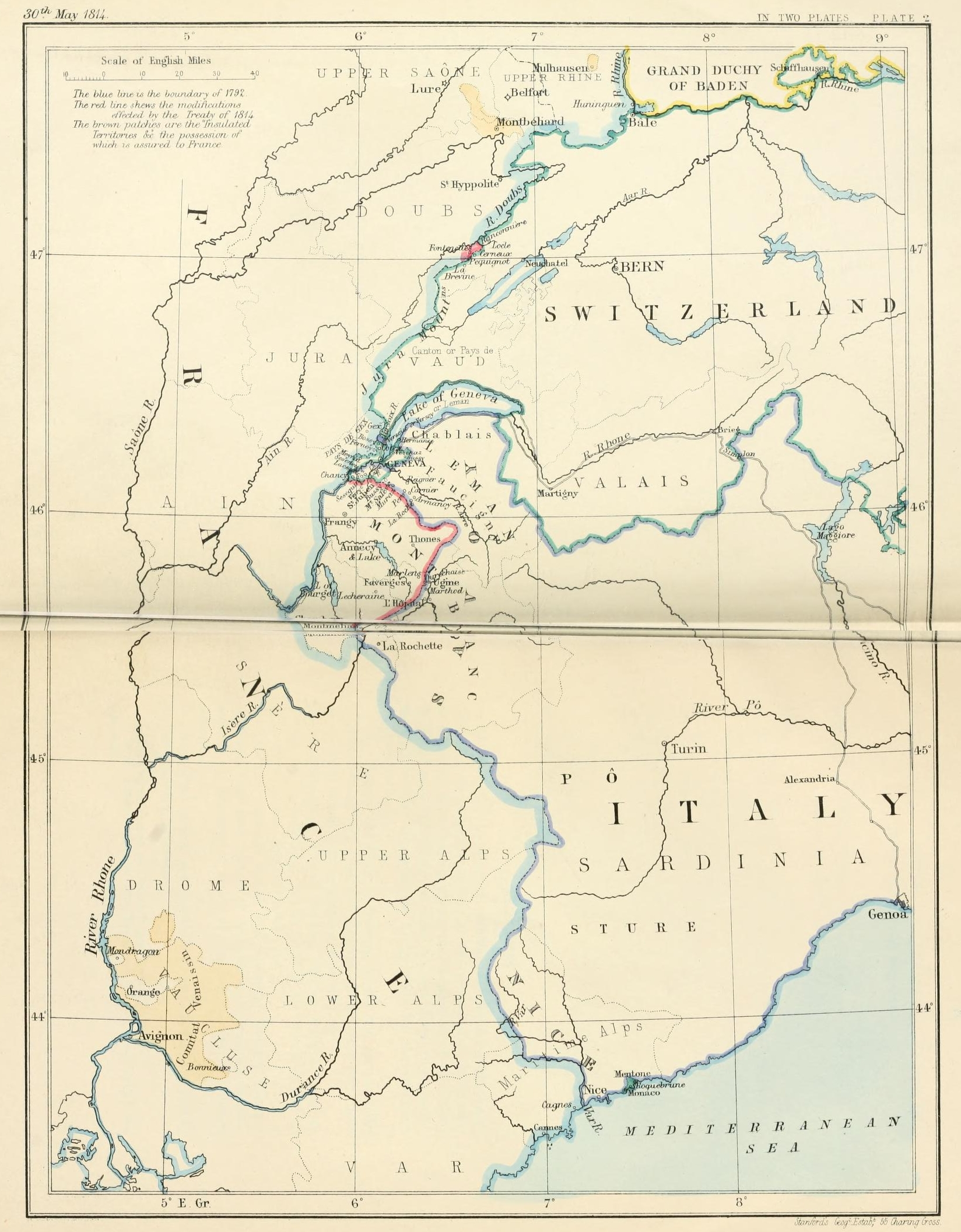
Southeastern border, following the Treaty of Paris (1814).

On 17 January 1814, Janus Gerbaix de Sonnaz (1736–1814), a former commander of the Savoie regiment, proclaimed the restoration of the King of Sardinia in Thonon and organized a battalion of volunteers with the support of General Bubna. Despite this initiative, local reactions were mixed, and coalition troops were often viewed with hostility by segments of the Savoyard population.

The Treaty of Paris (1814) proposed a partition of Savoie, assigning the majority of the territory, including Chambéry and Annecy, to France, while the Kingdom of Sardinia recovered Maurienne and the Isère Valley up to Montmélian. The proposed division encountered opposition from various segments of the Savoyard population, including rural communities, republican elites, and royalist figures such as Joseph de Maistre.

During the Hundred Days, Napoleon’s brief return to power in 1815 was met with general indifference in Savoie, although military figures such as General Dessaix and the Savoyard General Curial offered limited resistance during the final Austrian incursion.

Abbé Claude-François de Thiollaz (1751–1832), who would later become bishop of Annecy under the Sardinian Restoration, played a significant role in the religious Counter-Revolution in Savoie. He led a delegation of Savoyard nobles—including General Hippolyte Gerbaix de Sonnaz and Count François-Sébastien-Joseph de Chevron-Villette—tasked with negotiating the revision of the first Treaty of Paris (1814) to secure the full reintegration of Savoie into the Kingdom of Sardinia. The second Treaty of Paris (1815) restored all of Savoie to Victor Emmanuel I, who had returned from exile in Cagliarito reestablish control over Piedmont, the Duchy of Savoie, and the County of Nice.

== Timeline of the revolutionary period ==
- (1770: Sale of feudal rights under Victor Amadeus III. In some respects, Savoie was slightly ahead of the 1789 abolition of feudalism in revolutionary France.)

1792

- Spring: Foundation of the Club of the Allobroges in Paris.
- August: Creation of the Legion of the Allobroges led by Doppet.
- July 25: Alliance between Austria and the Kingdom of Sardinia.
- September 22: A French army under Montesquiou invades Savoy.
- Late September: Arrival of the four commissioners of the Convention, including Simond. On October 6, they convene an assembly of the duchy's communes.
- October 6: The Convention’s commissioners convene an assembly of the communes.
- October: The so-called National Assembly of the Allobroges meets in Chambéry.
- October 26: The Assembly confiscates Church property, prohibits monastic vows, and sets salaries for the clergy.
- October 27: The Assembly abolishes noble titles and privileges.
- October 29: The Assembly dissolves. Doppet and Simond return to Paris to deliver the wish of the Allobroges to be united with France. (The majority of Savoyard communes had voted in favor of union with France, with the explicit condition that the French Revolution would respect Savoyard religious liberties and that Savoy would be exempt from the Civil Constitution of the Clergy. This demand would not be honored by the Convention).
- November 27: Following an intervention by Abbé Grégoire, the French Convention decrees the annexation of Savoy to France.

1793

- February: Election of Savoyard deputies to the Convention.
- February 8: Reduction of Savoy’s dioceses to a single one. Imposition of an oath on priests.
- February 16: Decree ordering a general inventory of Church property.
- March 6: Election of Abbé Panisset as constitutional bishop of Mont-Blanc, in Annecy. This would be the only episcopal seat in Savoy until Bishop Panisset’s resignation in 1796. Savoy would remain without a bishopric until the Concordat of 1801.
- March 10: Enforcement begins of the mass conscription ordered by the Convention.
- March 23: Liquidation and dissolution of the Senate.
- April 25: Victor Amadeus III brings the Kingdom of Sardinia into the European coalition.
- April 28–May 3: Counter-revolutionary riots in Upper Faucigny.
- May 4–10: Counter-revolutionary uprising in the Thônes valley.
- August: Sardinian offensives at the Col de la Balme (August 11) and the Col du Petit-Saint-Bernard (August 15).
- August 31: Anglo-Sardinian alliance.
- September 11: (Theoretical) mass conscription in the Department of Mont-Blanc.
- September 18: Suppression of external signs of religion and worship.
- September 29: French victory over the Sardinians at the Mirabel bridge near Sallanches.
- November 8: Confiscation of church bells.
- November 25: Destruction of public crosses.

1794

- January 8: Appointment of Albitte as representative on mission in Ain and Mont-Blanc.
- February 2: Albitte arrives in Chambéry.
- February 7: Arrest of all suspects and immediate confiscation of their property.
- March 5: Deportation of all suspect priests.
- March 18: Urban planning project for Chambéry.
- April 24: The French army takes the Col du Petit-Saint-Bernard.
- May 19: Albitte is assigned to the Army of the Alps. Favre-Buisson is appointed public prosecutor at the revolutionary tribunal.
- June 14: Masséna seizes the Col du Mont-Cenis.
- July: Revolutionary government established in Geneva.
- July: Arrival of the first missionary priests in Savoy.
- July 27 (9 Thermidor Year II): Fall of Robespierre.

1795

- June: Second campaign for the sale of national property.
- August: Closure of clubs by the representative on the mission Cassanyès.
- October 26: In Paris, the Directory succeeds the National Convention.

1796

- February 22: Monsignor Panisset, constitutional bishop of the French Revolution, resigns his seat in Annecy and recants in Lausanne, prompted by Abbé Claude-François de Thiollaz, a leader of the Savoyard religious Counter-Revolution. Until 1802, Savoy would remain without a bishopric, when the Concordat of 1801 reinstated an episcopal see in Chambéry. Under the Sardinian Restoration, Annecy would be granted a new bishopric in 1823, with Mgr de Thiollaz as its first bishop.
- March: Bonaparte assumes command of the Army of Italy in the southern Alps.
- April 12/21: French victory at Montenotte in southern Piedmont.
- May 15: Treaty of Paris: Victor Amadeus III recognizes the annexation of Nice and Savoy to France.
- June: Garin, a moderate, becomes commissioner of the Executive Directory.
- June: Resumption of the sale of national property.
- June: Creation of a Central School in Chambéry.
- October 16: Death of Victor Amadeus III. His son Charles Emmanuel IV succeeds him.

1797

- September 4 (18 Fructidor Year V): Coup d’état.
- September: Resumption of arrests and deportations of priests.

1798

- April 15: French troops enter Geneva.
- December 8: Charles Emmanuel IV leaves Turin and takes refuge in Sardinia.

1799

- January: A mobile column is deployed in Maurienne to suppress refractory priests and draft evaders.

1812

- Napoleon secretly transfers Pope Pius VII to Fontainebleau. On June 12, 1812, Doctor Balthazard Claraz, surgeon-physician, saves the life of Pope Pius VII, who, ill and exhausted, had just received extreme unction at the hospice of the Mont-Cenis Pass during his transfer from Savona to Fontainebleau.

== See also ==
- History of Savoy
- French Revolution
- Savoy's annexation to France (1792)
- Treaty of Turin (1816)
- 1st Infantry Regiment "San Giusto"
- National Volunteers (France)

== Bibliography ==
- Sorrel, Christian; Townley, Corinne (1999). La Savoie, la France et la Révolution. Repères et échos 1789-1799 [Savoy, France, and the Revolution. Key events and echoes, 1789–1799] (in French). Chambéry: Cundéra. ISBN 978-2-86677-053-2.
- Ménabréa, Henri (1976). Histoire de la Savoie [History of Savoy] (in French). Les Imprimeries réunies de Chambéry.
- Avezou, R (1949). Histoire de la Savoie [History of Savoy] (in French). PUF.
- Lovie, Jacques (1978). "Art et Histoire" [Art and History]. Savoie [Savoy] (in French). Christine Bonneton éditeur.
- Palluel-Guillard, André (1986). La Savoie de la Révolution française à nos jours, XIXe – XXe siècle [Savoy from the French Revolution to the present day, 19th–20th centuries] (in French). Ouest France Université. ISBN 2-85882-536-X.
- Gabolde, Maurice (2013). Philibert Simond : contribution à l'histoire de la Révolution [Philibert Simond: contribution to the history of the Revolution] (in French). Paris: L'Harmattan. ISBN 978-2-296-99569-7.
- Simond, Philibert (2015). Comment j'ai apporté la Savoie à la France, Un vicaire hors du commun [How I brought Savoie to France, An extraordinary vicar] (in French). Paris: L'Harmattan. ISBN 978-2-343-06923-4.
