= Roc de Gleisin =

Mountain in France

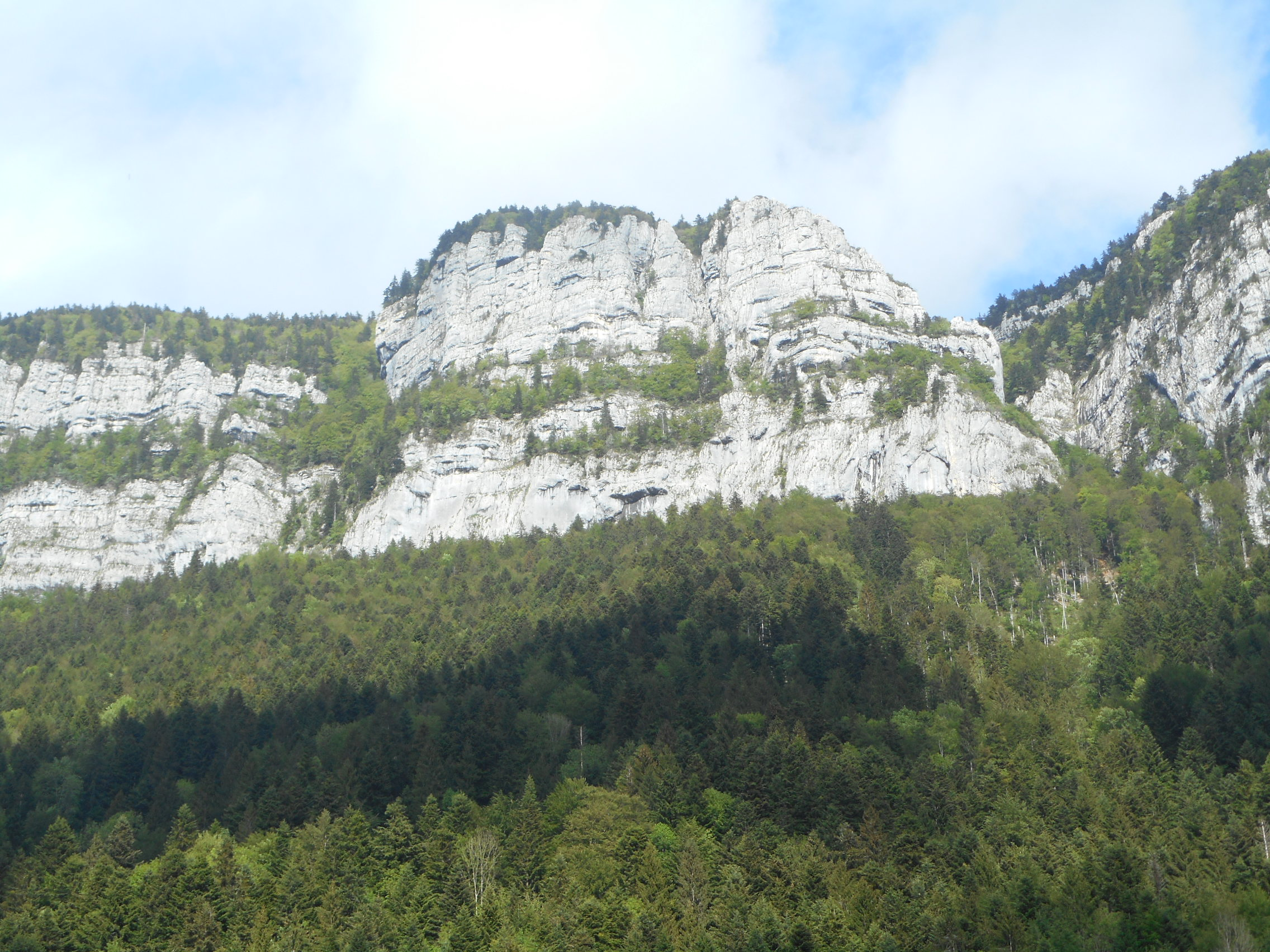

Highest point
- Elevation: 1,434 m (4,705 ft)
- Coordinates: 45°26′32″N 05°50′53″E

Geography
- Location within France
- Location: Savoie, France
- Parent range: Chartreuse Mountains

Climbing
- Easiest route: From the Col du Grapillon

The Roc de Gleisin is a Massif de la Chartreuse mountain located between Entremont-le-Vieux and Saint-Pierre-d'Entremont in Savoie, eastern France. Rock bars on its western side also delimit the territory of Corbel district. The summit is 1,434 metres (4,705 ft) above sea level. The mountain is most composed of limestone.

== Hike ==
The top of the roc de Gleisin ridge allows access to Roche Veyrand south, Col de la Cluse north or to return to the town of Saint-Pierre-d'Entremont in Savoie east.
