= Col du Granier =

Mountain pass in the French Alps

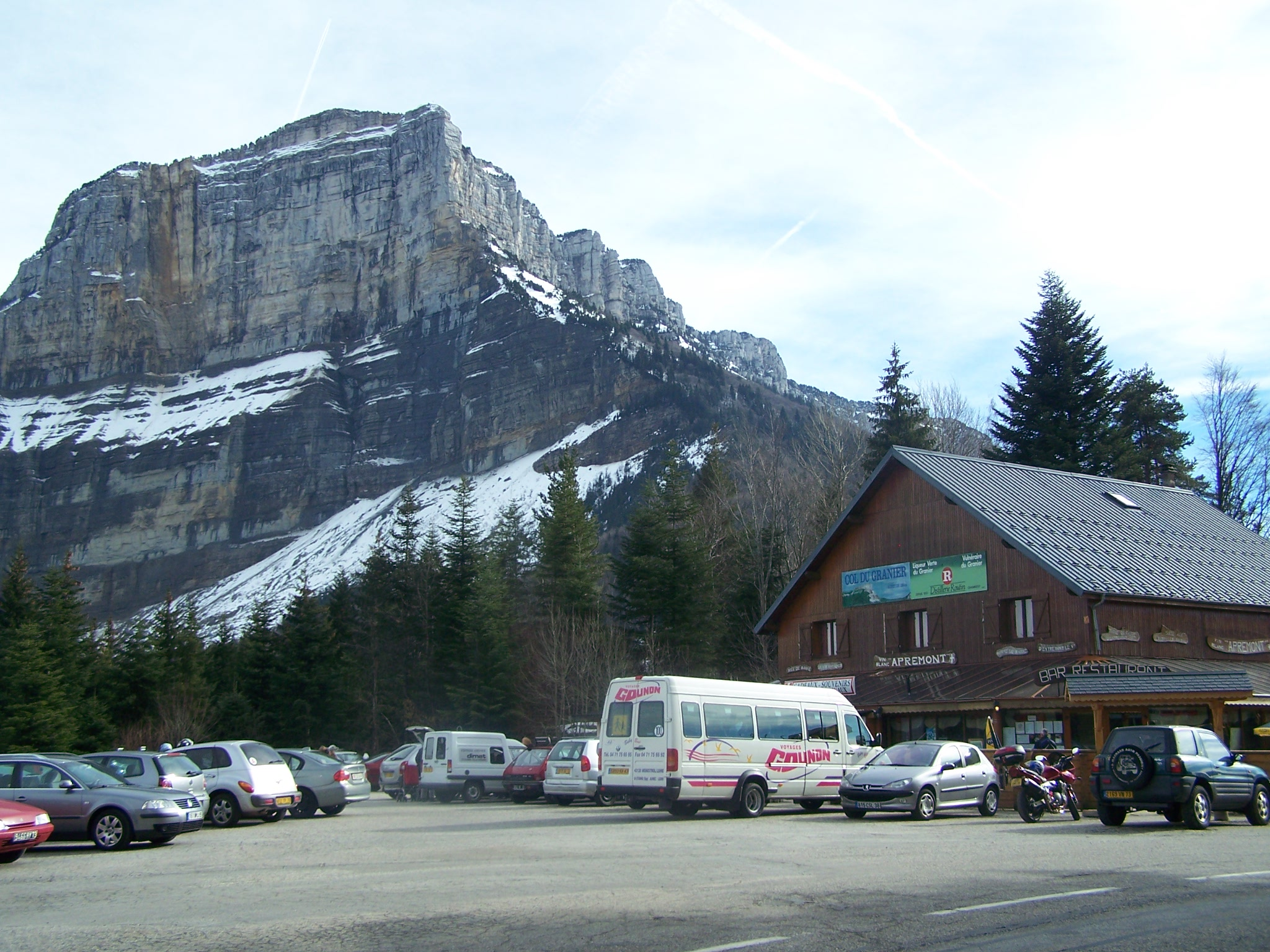
- View of Mont Granier from the Col

- Location within Alps
- Elevation: 1,134 m (3,720 ft)
- Traversed by: D912

Third Approach
- Location: Savoie, France
- Range: Alps
- Coordinates: 45°28′50″N 5°54′55″E

Col du Granier (el. 1,134 m.) is a mountain pass in the Alps in the department of Savoie in France which crosses the Chartreuse Mountains to connect the villages of Entremont-le-Vieux (south), Apremont (north) and Chapareillan (east). It has been traversed several times by the Tour de France cycle race, including on Stage 12 of the 2012 race. It is situated between Mont Granier (1,933 m) (south-east) and Mont Joigny (1,558 m) (north-west).

== Cycle racing ==
=== Details of the climbs ===
From Chambéry (north), the climb is 15.3 km. gaining 864 m in height, at an average of 5.65%, with a maximum of 7.8%.

From Chapareillan (east), the climb (via the D285) is 10.5 km. gaining 854 m in height, at an average of 8.13%, with a maximum of 10.4%.

From Saint-Baldoph (northeast), the climb is 11.50 km. gaining 823 m in height, at an average of 7.16%, with a maximum of 10.3%.

From St-Pierre-d'Entremont (south), the climb is 9.4 km. gaining 494 m in height, at an average of 5.26%, with a maximum of 9.2%.

=== Appearances in Tour de France ===
The pass was first included in the Tour de France in 1947 and has since featured 17 times and is generally ranked as a Category 1 or 2 climb. It was crossed most recently on Stage 12 of the 2012 tour, between Saint-Jean-de-Maurienne and Annonay-Davézieux, approaching from the direction of Chapareillan.

Year	Stage	Category	Direction of approach	Start	Finish	Leader at the summit
2012	12	1	East	Saint-Jean-de-Maurienne	Annonay-Davézieux	Robert Kišerlovski (CRO)
1998	16	2	South	Vizille	Albertville	Stéphane Heulot (FRA)
1989	19	2	North	Villard-de-Lans	Briançon	Pedro Delgado (ESP)
1985	12	2	North	Morzine	Lans-en-Vercors	Reynel Montoya (COL)
1983	17	2	South	La Tour-du-Pin	L'Alpe d'Huez	Christian Jourdan (FRA)
1978	17	2	South	Grenoble	Morzine	Hennie Kuiper (NED)
1972	14b	1	East	Valloire	Aix-les-Bains	Lucien Van Impe (BEL)
1970	12	1	North	Thonon-les-Bains	Grenoble	Andres Gandarias (ESP)
1968	18	1	North	Saint-Etienne	Grenoble	Roger Pingeon (FRA)
1965	17	2	South	Briançon	Aix-les-Bains	Julio Jimenez (ESP)
1962	19	2	South	Briançon	Aix-les-Bains	Raymond Poulidor (FRA)
1961	9	1	North	Saint-Etienne	Grenoble	Charly Gaul (LUX)
1960	17	2	South	Briançon	Aix-les-Bains	René Marigil (ESP)
1958	21	2	South	Briançon	Aix-les-Bains	Charly Gaul (LUX)
1951	21	2	South	Briançon	Aix-les-Bains	Bernardo Ruiz (ESP)
1948	14	Not ranked	South	Briançon	Aix-les-Bains	Gino Bartali (ITA)
1947	7	1	North	Lyon	Grenoble	Pierre Brambilla (ITA)

=== Appearances in Tour de France Femmes ===
The pass was included in Stage 7 of the 2025 Tour de France Femmes.

Year	Stage	Category	Direction of approach	Start	Finish	Leader at the summit
2025	7	2	South	Bourg-en-Bresse	Chambéry	Maëva Squiban (FRA)
