= Annexation of Savoy =

Annexation of Savoy may refer to:

- 1792 French annexation of Savoy
- 1860 French annexation of Savoy
