= Col du Mollard =

- Location within France
- Elevation: 1,320 m (4,330 ft)
- Traversed by: D45

Location
- Location: Savoie, France
- Range: Alps
- Coordinates: 45°29′01″N 5°52′02″E

Signs and a Cross at Col du Mollard.

The Col du Mollard is a mountain pass located between the councils of Entremont-le-Vieux and Saint-Thibaud-de-Couz in the Chartreuse Mountains and culminating at 1,320 meters above sea level.

== Hike ==
The start of a hike is possible from Le Désert d'Entremont.
