= Roche Veyrand =

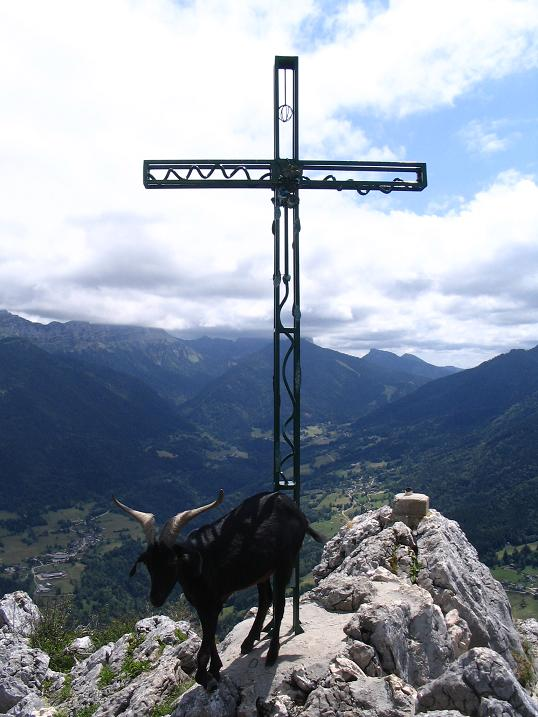

Highest point
- Elevation: 1,429 m (4,688 ft)
- Coordinates: 45°25′44″N 05°50′40″E

Geography
- Location within France
- Location: Savoie, France
- Parent range: Chartreuse Mountains

Roche Veyrand is a mountain of Savoie, France. It lies in the Chartreuse Mountains range. It has an elevation of 1,429 metres above sea level. It lies between the townships of Corbel and Saint-Pierre-d'Entremont in Savoie.

== Via ferrata ==
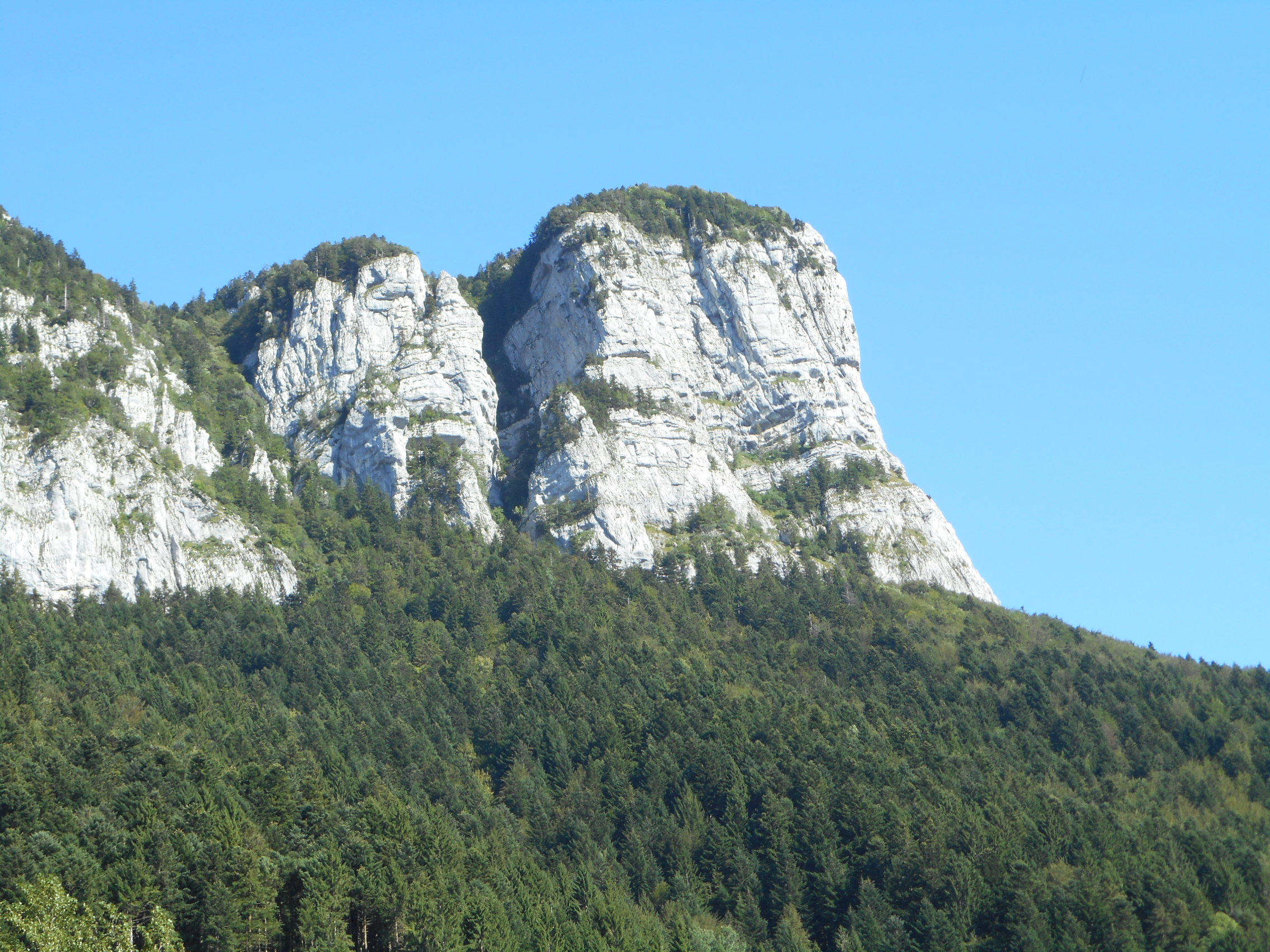
Roche Veyrand from Corbel Valley

The Fiolins hamlet is the starting point of a path leading to a via ferrata that passes through Roche Veyrand to reach the Entremonts Valley. Hike access (2 hours) is made easier by the Col de la Cluse (1,169 m).

The via ferrata is composed of two parts that can be done separately, the first hard enough, the second very hard. The course is very well furnished and many natural jacks can be used. The rain aftermathes, some parts may be slippery and require vigilance.

== Hike ==
The summit of roche Veyrand provides access to the Roc de Gleisin ridge.
