= Pointe de la Gorgeat =

Mountain in Savoie, France

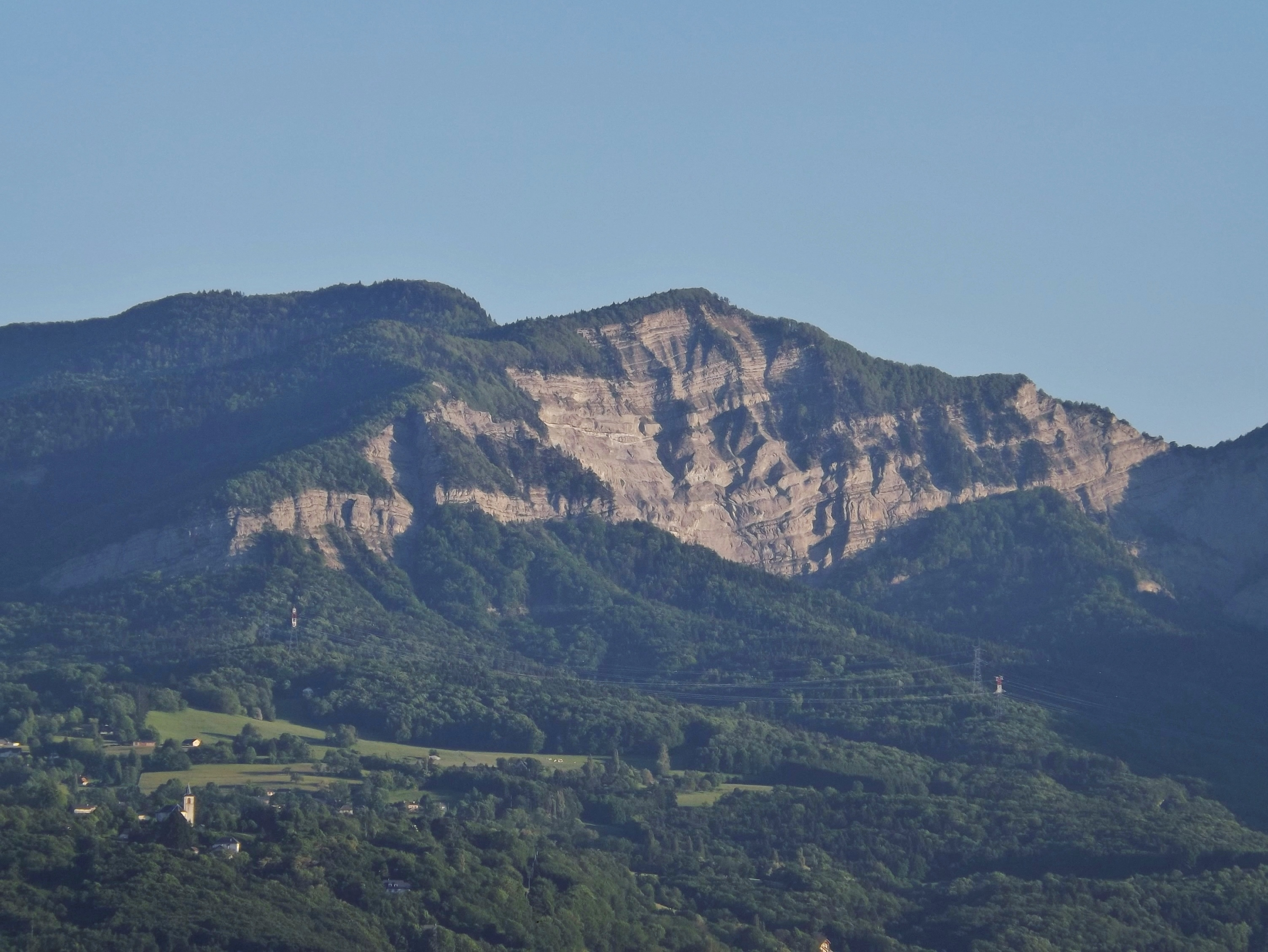
- Pointe de la Gorgeat seen from Chambéry

Highest point
- Elevation: 1,486 m (4,875 ft)
- Coordinates: 45°29′48″N 05°53′38″E

Geography
- Location within France
- Location: Savoie, France
- Parent range: Chartreuse Mountains

Climbing
- Easiest route: GR96 or from the col du Granier

The Pointe de la Gorgeat is a Chartreuse Mountain culminating at 1,486 m above sea level in the French department of Savoie.

== Hike ==
Departure is possible from the Col du Granier.
