= 1792 French annexation of Savoy =

1792 annexation of Savoy into France

The incorporation of Savoy into France in 1792 refers to the "reunion," as termed by the decree, or the occupation or "annexation," as described by historians, of the Duchy of Savoy to the French First Republic, decreed on November 27, 1792. This decision followed a report by the deputy from Loir-et-Cher, Father Henri Grégoire. Savoy remained part of France until 1815, with its permanent annexation occurring in 1860 through the Annexation of Savoy.

== Background ==
On the night of September 21–22, 1792, French revolutionary forces invaded the Duchy of Savoy without a prior declaration of war. These troops, part of the Army of the Alps, were led by Anne-Pierre de Montesquiou-Fézensac. The vanguard included the Legion of the Allobroges, which counted Joseph Marie Dessaix among its ranks.

On November 27, 1792, Father Grégoire presented his Report and Discussion on the Question of the Incorporation of Savoy into France to the National Convention, urging the assembly to decide on what he described as "the freely expressed wish of Savoy" to join the French Republic. This request was based on a petition from the National Assembly of the Allobroges, also known as the Assembly of the Deputies of the Communes of Savoy, during a session held on October 22, 1792, in Chambéry. The efforts of assembly members, including Philibert Simond, led to the incorporation of the Duchy of Savoy into France, alongside the abolition of the monarchy and feudal system. When put to a vote by a show of standing, only the deputy from Corrèze, Jean-Augustin Pénières, opposed the motion. The decree was subsequently adopted.

== Text of the Decree ==
The preamble of the Decree of November 27, 1792 (Reunion of Savoy with France) begins as follows:

The National Convention, having heard the report of its committees and recognized that the free and universal will of the sovereign people of Savoy, expressed in the communal assemblies, is to incorporate itself into the French Republic, proclaimed on September 21 of the same year; considering that nature, relations, and mutual interests make this reunion advantageous to both peoples, declares that it accepts the proposed reunion, and that from this moment, Savoy forms an integral part of the French Republic.

— National Convention, November 27, 1792

Article 1 specifies that "Savoy shall provisionally form an eighty-fourth department under the name of Mont-Blanc Department."

== Commemoration ==
In the fall of 1872, Jules Philippe organized a visit by Léon Gambetta to Savoy to celebrate the 80th anniversary of Savoy's first incorporation into France.

In 1892, France marked the centennial of Savoy's annexation with the unveiling of a statue, La Sasson, sculpted by Alexandre Falguière (1831–1900).

== See also ==
- French Revolution
- French First Republic
- Duchy of Savoy
- Annexation of Savoy
- History of Savoy
- National Convention
- Army of the Alps
- Henri Grégoire
- Mont-Blanc (department)
- Treaty of Paris (1815)
- History of Savoy (1792–1815)

== Bibliography ==
- Assemblée nationale des Allobroges (1792). L'Assemblée nationale des Allobroges en 1792 [The National Assembly of the Allobroges in 1792]. Imprimerie du Cercle social. p. 91.
- Dessaix, Joseph (1857). Histoire de la réunion de la Savoie à la France en 1792 : documents inédits recueillis et publiés [History of the Reunion of Savoy with France in 1792: Unpublished Documents Collected and Published] (in French). Imprimerie nationale. p. 463.
- Masse, Jules (1891). Histoire de l'annexion de la Savoie à la France en 1792 [History of the Annexation of Savoy to France in 1792] (in French). Vol. 3. Grenoble: Impr. de F. Allier père et fils. pp. 100, 217, 300.
- Devos, Roger; Grosperrin, Bernard; Leguay, Jean-Pierre (1986). Palluel-Guillard, André (ed.). La Savoie de Révolution française à nos jours, XIXe-XXe [Savoy from the French Revolution to the Present, 19th-20th Centuries] (in French). Ouest France Université. p. 626. ISBN 2-85882-536-X.
- Sorrel, Christian; Townley, Corinne (1999). La Savoie, la France et la Révolution. Repères et échos 1789-1799 [Savoy, France, and the Revolution: Landmarks and Echoes 1789-1799] (in French). Chambéry: Cundéra. p. 380. ISBN 978-2-86677-053-2.
- Sorrel, Christian (2013). "Deux « réunions » pour un destin français : la Savoie de 1792 à 1860" [Two "Reunions" for a French Destiny: Savoy from 1792 to 1860]. In Berlioz, Jacques; Poncet, Olivier (eds.). Se donner à la France ? Les rattachements pacifiques de territoires à la France (XIVe-XIXe) [To Give Oneself to France? Peaceful Incorporations of Territories into France (14th-19th Centuries)]. Études et rencontres (in French). Paris: Publications de l'École nationale des chartes. p. 148. ISBN 978-2-35723-031-6.
