= Citadel of Château-d'Oléron =

17th-century citadel in Le Château-d'Oléron, France

Citadelle du Château-d'Oléron
- Le Château-d'Oléron, Charente-Maritime, Nouvelle-Aquitaine in France
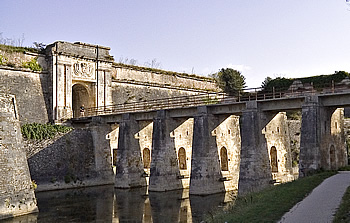
- The fixed bridge of the Royal Gate

Site information
- Type: Citadel
- Owner: Commune
- Condition: Fortified place

Location
- Coordinates: 45.8858333333333°N 1.19472222222°W

Site history
- Built: 1630–1704
- Architect: Pierre d'Argencour, Louis Nicolas de Clerville, François Ferry (under Vauban's supervision)

The Citadel of Château-d'Oléron is a military fortress constructed between 1630 and 1704 to safeguard the southern part of the Île d'Oléron in the Charente-Maritime department of southwestern France. It stands as one of the principal historic monuments in the town of Le Château-d'Oléron.

Originally built to replace a dilapidated medieval castle, the citadel was commissioned by Cardinal Richelieu in 1630 and later modernized by the renowned military engineer Vauban. It became a critical component of the Atlantic coast's defense system and served as a key training and embarkation point for soldiers bound for New France. During the Reign of Terror and again in 1870, it functioned as a prison. Classified as a historic monument in 1929, the citadel was occupied by German forces in 1940 and damaged during an Allied bombing on 17 April 1945.

== History ==
=== Medieval fortifications ===
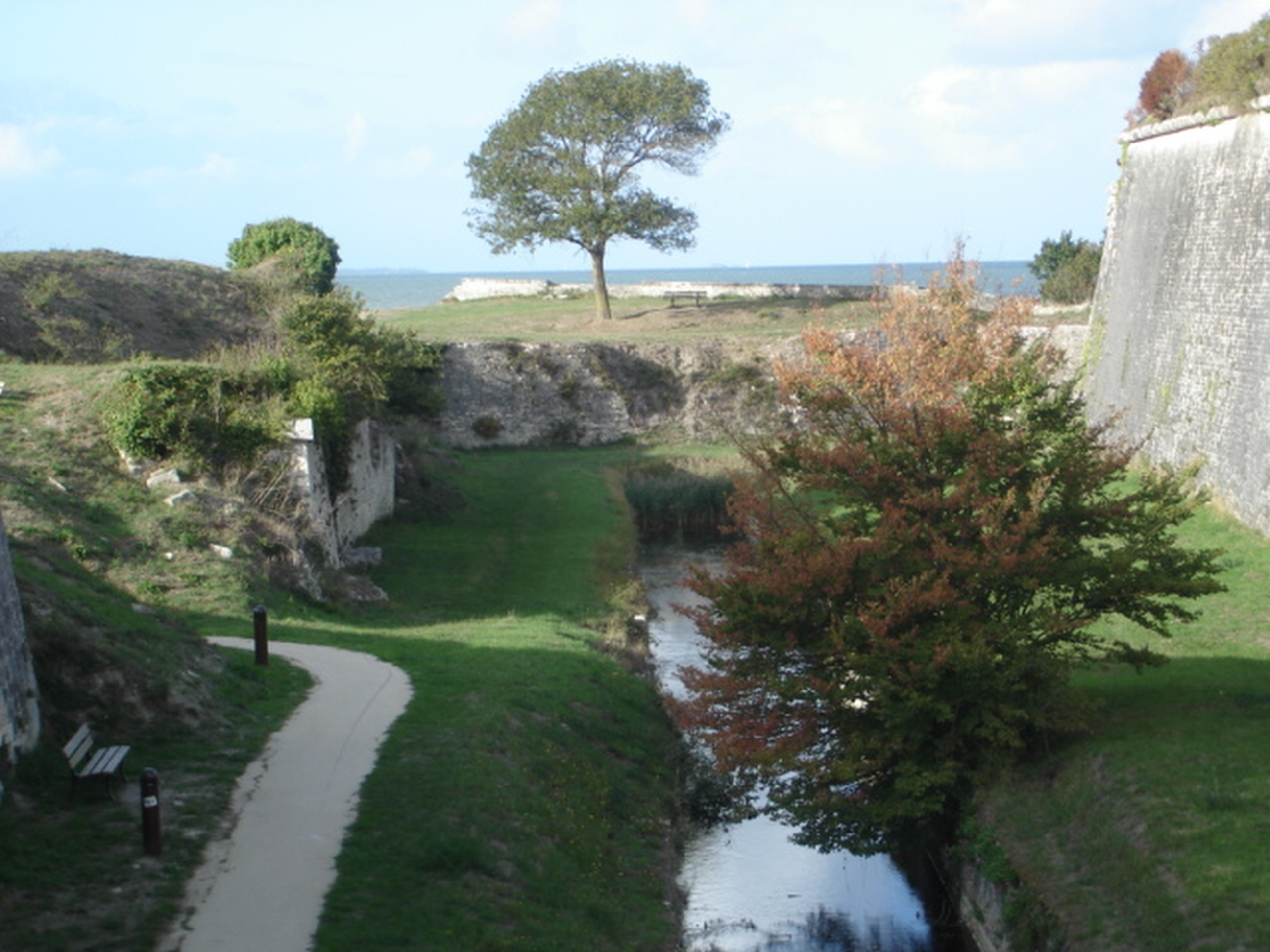
Promenade within the citadel's fortifications.

The site of the current citadel was likely fortified as early as the 11th century. In the 12th century, a castle belonging to the Dukes of Aquitaine hosted Eleanor of Aquitaine. Following her visit, she issued the Rôles d'Oléron, one of the earliest maritime law codes. The stronghold was contested during conflicts between French and Anglo-Aquitainian forces. Part of the English-aligned Duchy of Aquitaine, the Île d'Oléron became permanently French in the 15th century.

=== Modern fortifications ===
During the French Wars of Religion, the castle was a focal point of conflict between Huguenot and Catholic forces. In 1586, Protestant troops led by Agrippa d'Aubigné seized the castle and the island. The Catholic governor of Brouage, François d'Espinay de Saint-Luc, responded with a force of several thousand, including 400 arquebusiers, 200 pikemen, 50 musketeers, and garrisons from Brouage and Saintes. The castle was swiftly recaptured, and d'Aubigné was imprisoned.

By 1625, the castle's vulnerability was evident, prompting Cardinal Richelieu to commission engineer Pierre d'Argencour to build a bastioned fortress east of the medieval site. This triangular structure, with two bastions facing the town, formed the citadel's core. Louis XIV visited in 1660, but the fortress was deemed inadequate, leading Colbert to task Louis Nicolas de Clerville with upgrades, including an ocean-facing bastioned front, a decision criticized by contemporaries.

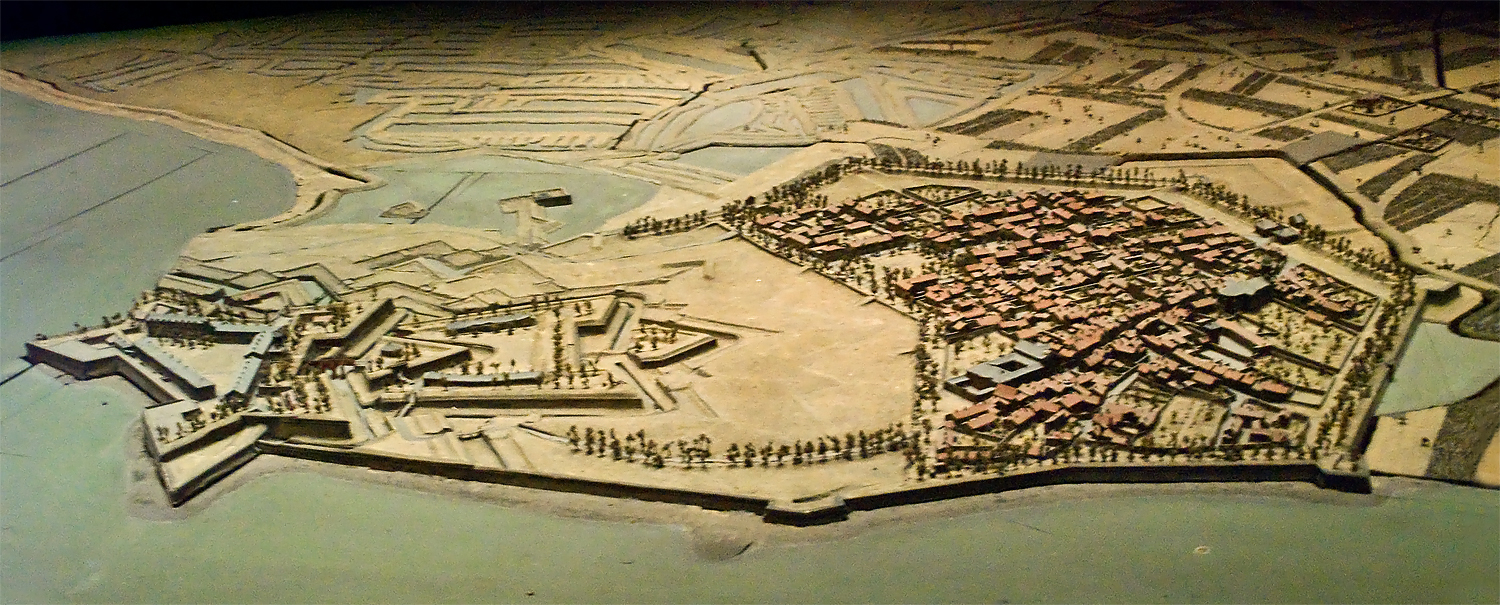
1703 relief plan of the citadel designed by Vauban, displayed at the Musée des Plans-reliefs, Paris.

In 1685, Vauban inspected the fortifications, noting their weaknesses. He proposed two hornworks, one facing the town and another the marshes. Construction began urgently in 1688 during the War of the League of Augsburg, employing nearly 7000 workers, including requisitioned peasants. Much of the medieval town, including two churches and a convent, was demolished. Harsh conditions in the winter of 1689–1690 led to many worker deaths. A bastion collapsed shortly after completion, replaced by a demi-lune. A formal labor recruitment campaign followed, attracting local salt workers.

In 1691, Vauban expanded the citadel with new bastioned towers, a counterguard, and covered ways, requiring further expropriations and demolitions. A glacis was added in 1695, and a new town with a grid layout and modern walls was begun in 1699. Construction halted in 1704.

The citadel housed a garrison for coastal defense and served as a staging point for troops bound for New France. From 1710 to 1716, Acadia garrison soldiers trained there, followed by Louisiana company members in 1716 and Quebec-bound troops in 1720. A new port was dug at the fortress's base in 1740. In 1757, English raids prompted further reinforcements by Marquis de Montalembert. It also trained Louis-Joseph de Montcalm's battalions.

Converted to a prison during the French Revolution and again in 1870, it returned to military use until 1911. Occupied by the Wehrmacht in 1940, it was heavily damaged by an Allied bombing on 17 April 1945. Restoration occurred from 1959 to 1971 and resumed in 1988.

A major tourist attraction in Le Château-d'Oléron, the citadel was designated a historic monument on 14 June 1929, except for parts of counterguard no. 8 and demi-lune no. 9, declassified on 8 February 1935. The Bastion de la Brèche once housed the "Memorial of New France Soldiers," a museum on French North American history. The arsenal, completed in October 2015, now includes a 250-seat auditorium, a sea-view reception hall, and a flexible exhibition space. Since 2014, historical sculptures by Alain Nouraud adorn the site.

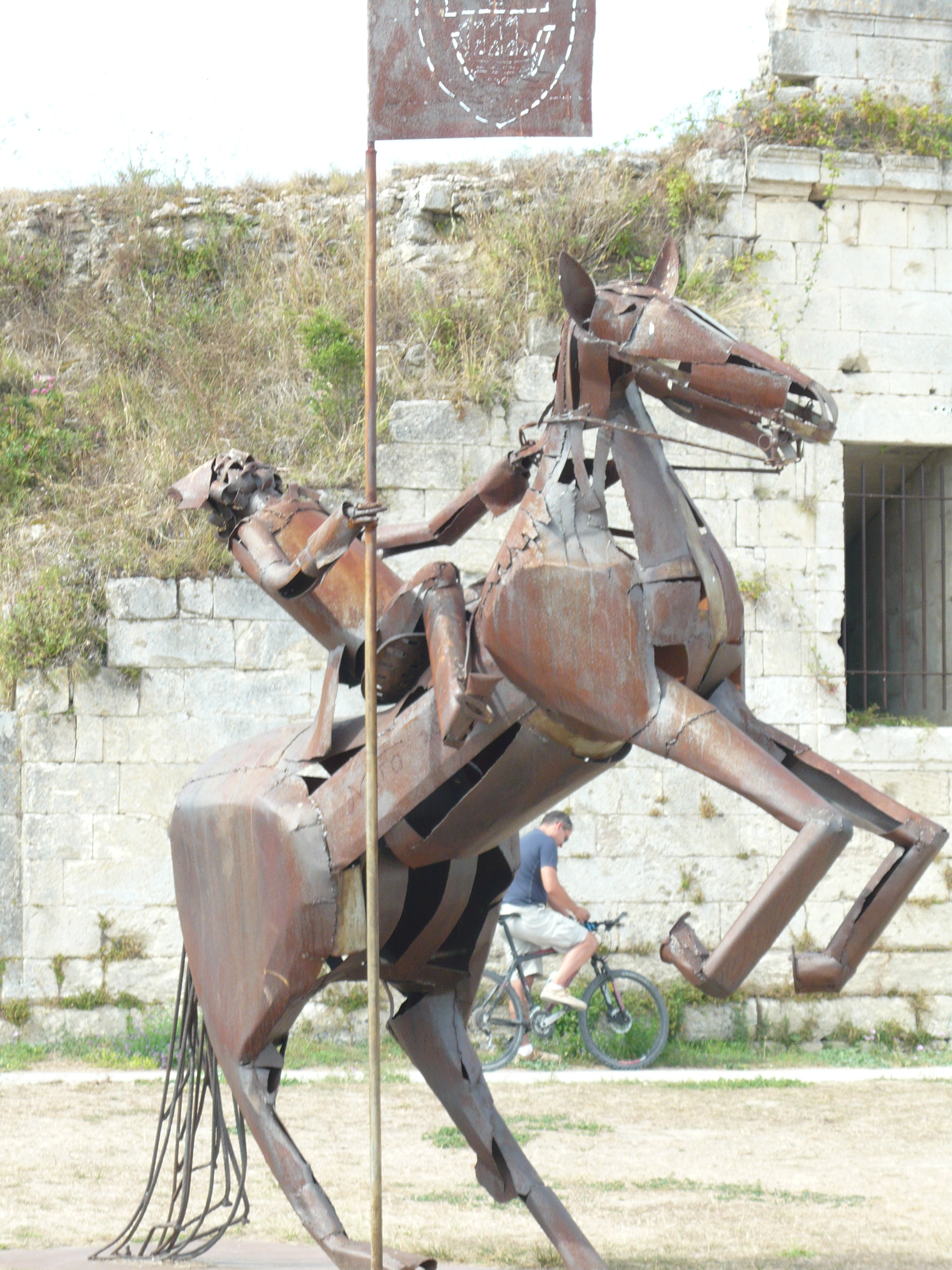
Cavalier with standard.

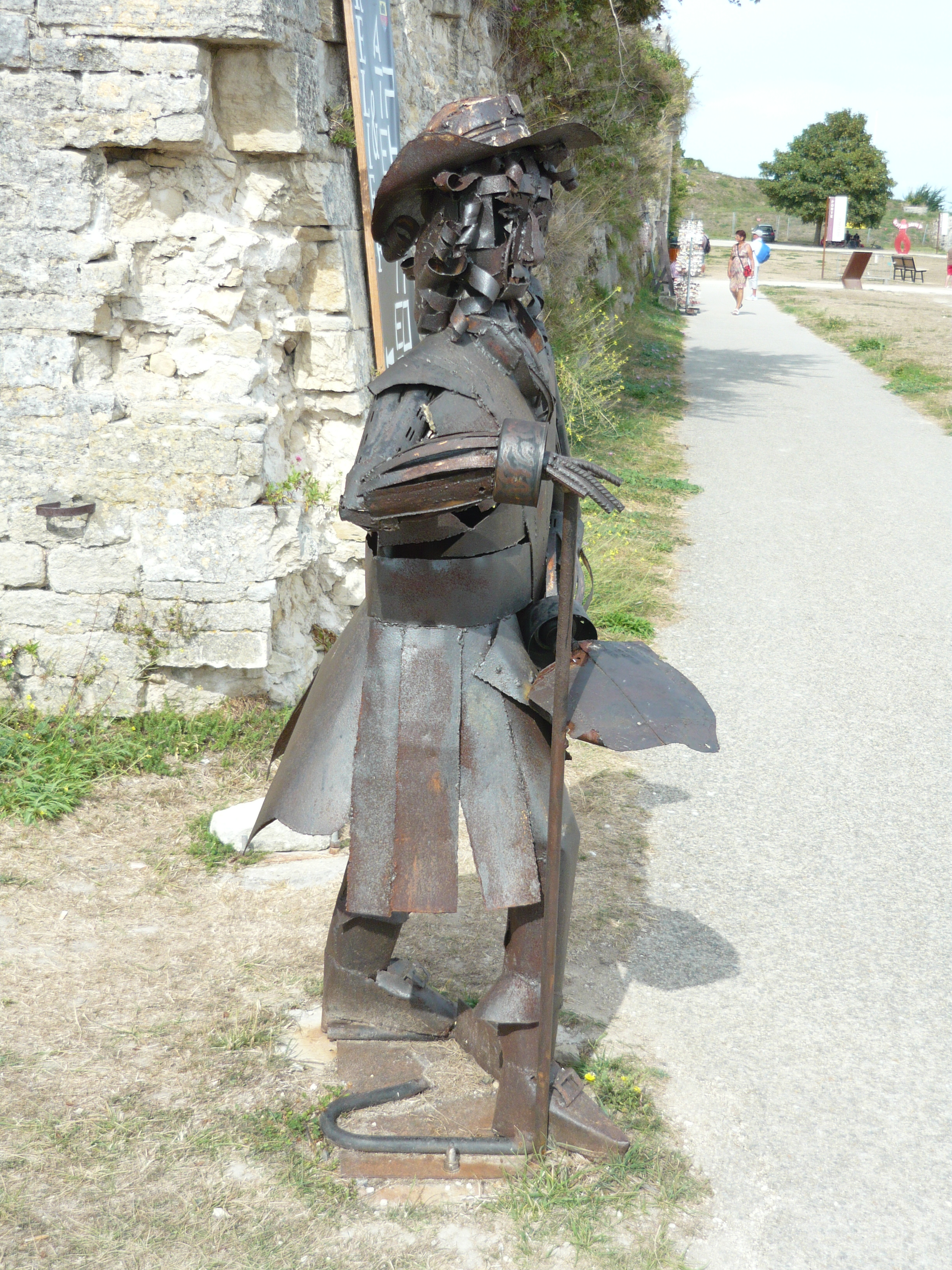
Marshal Vauban.

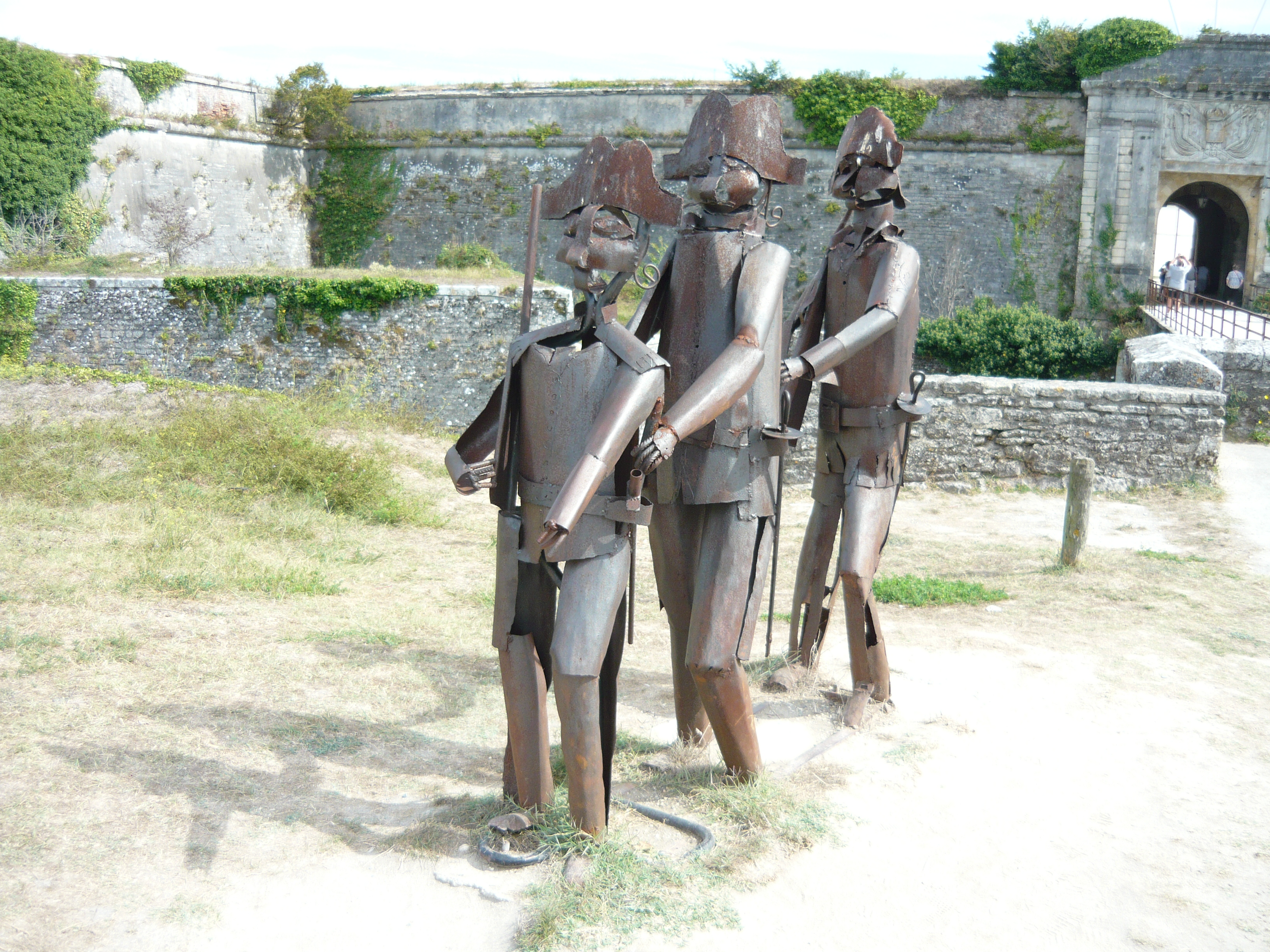
The patrol.

== Description ==
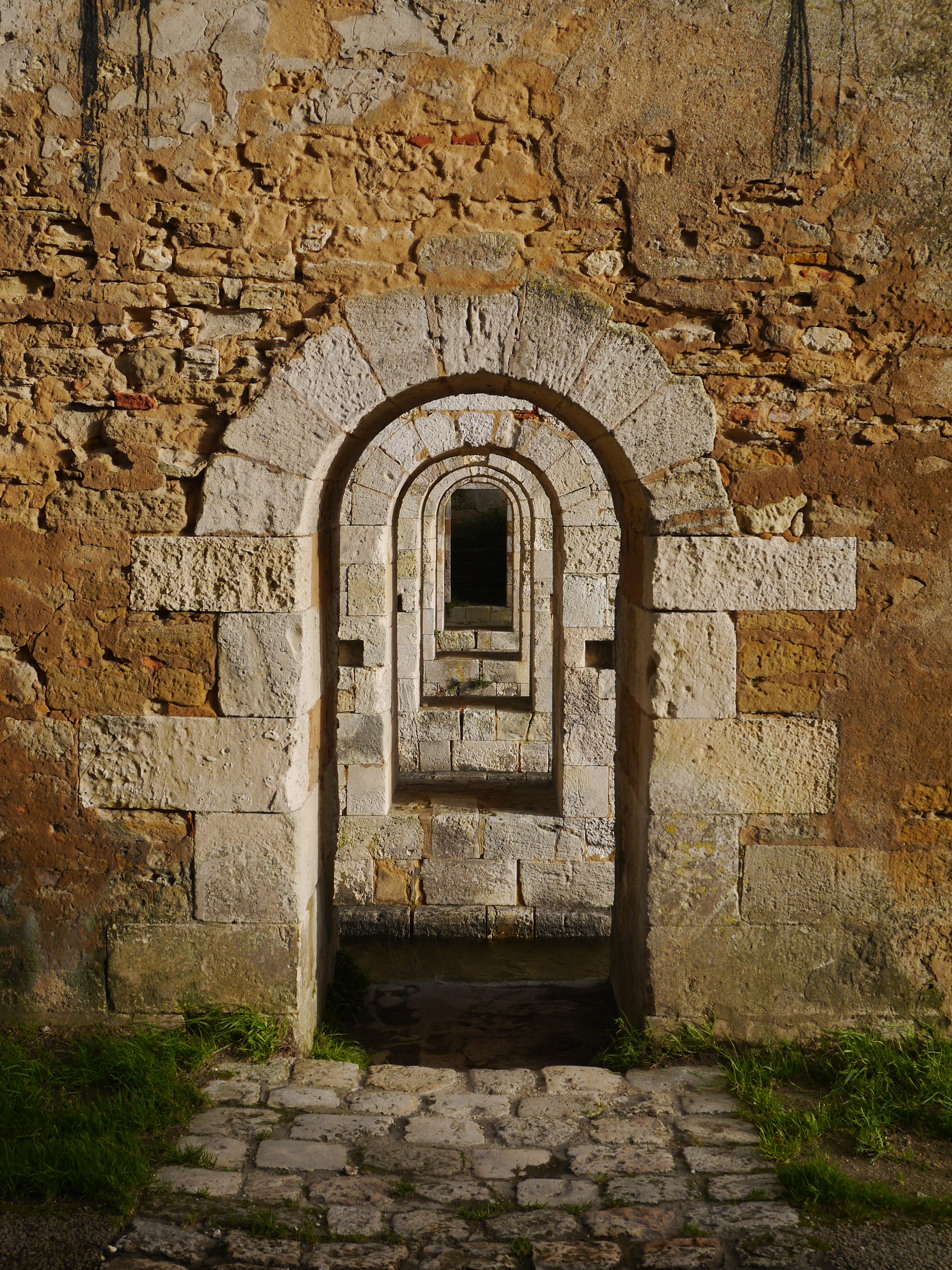
Hollow piers of the bridge leading to the Royal Gate.

Situated on elevated terrain overlooking the Atlantic Ocean and the low-lying marshes of Ors, the citadel reflects construction phases from 1630 to 1704 under Louis XIII and Louis XIV. Despite significant damage during World War II, it retains several bastions, casemates, and buildings.

The Royal Gate, likely built around 1640, features arms attributed to Cardinal Richelieu and is preceded by a fixed bridge and a demi-lune. The main courtyard centers on the arsenal, a 17th-century longitudinal building with multiple functions: an arsenal, provisions store, flour store, and chapel. To the right of the gate lies the governor's residence. Flanking the arsenal are the Bastion de la Brèche and Bastion Royal, both used for thematic exhibitions, including one on New France soldiers. An isolated powder magazine stands south of the main entrance.

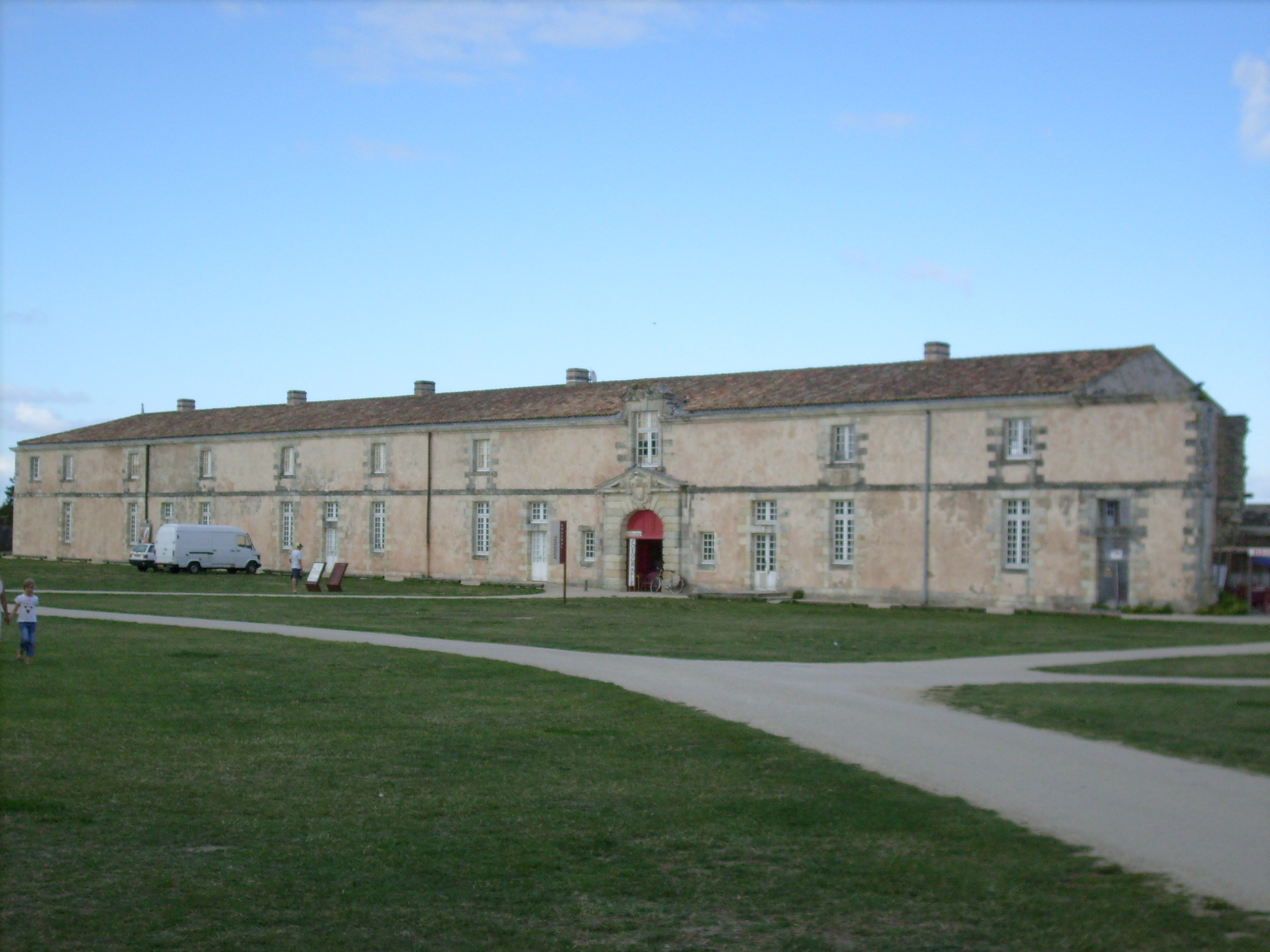
The arsenal building.

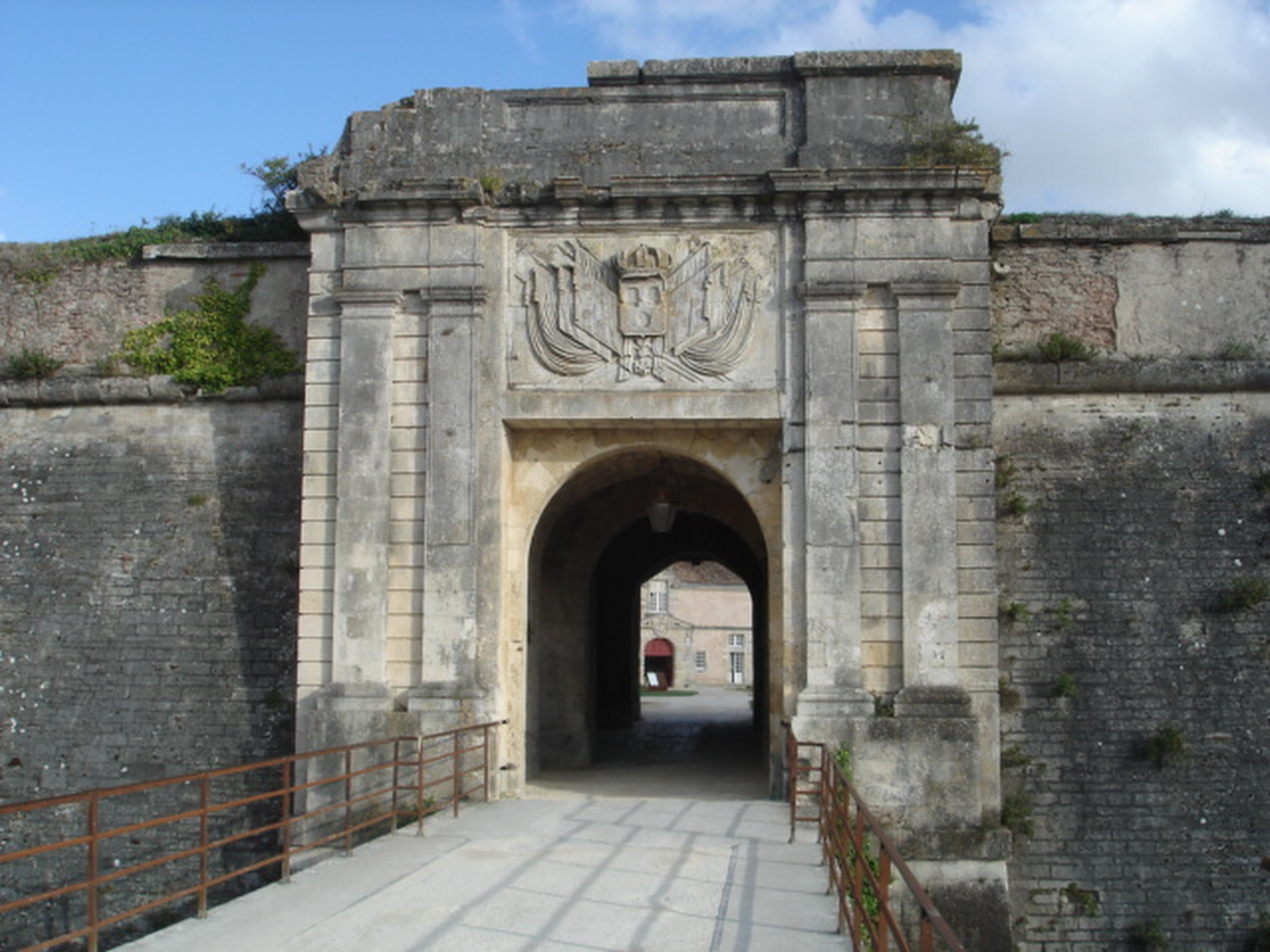
The Royal Gate.

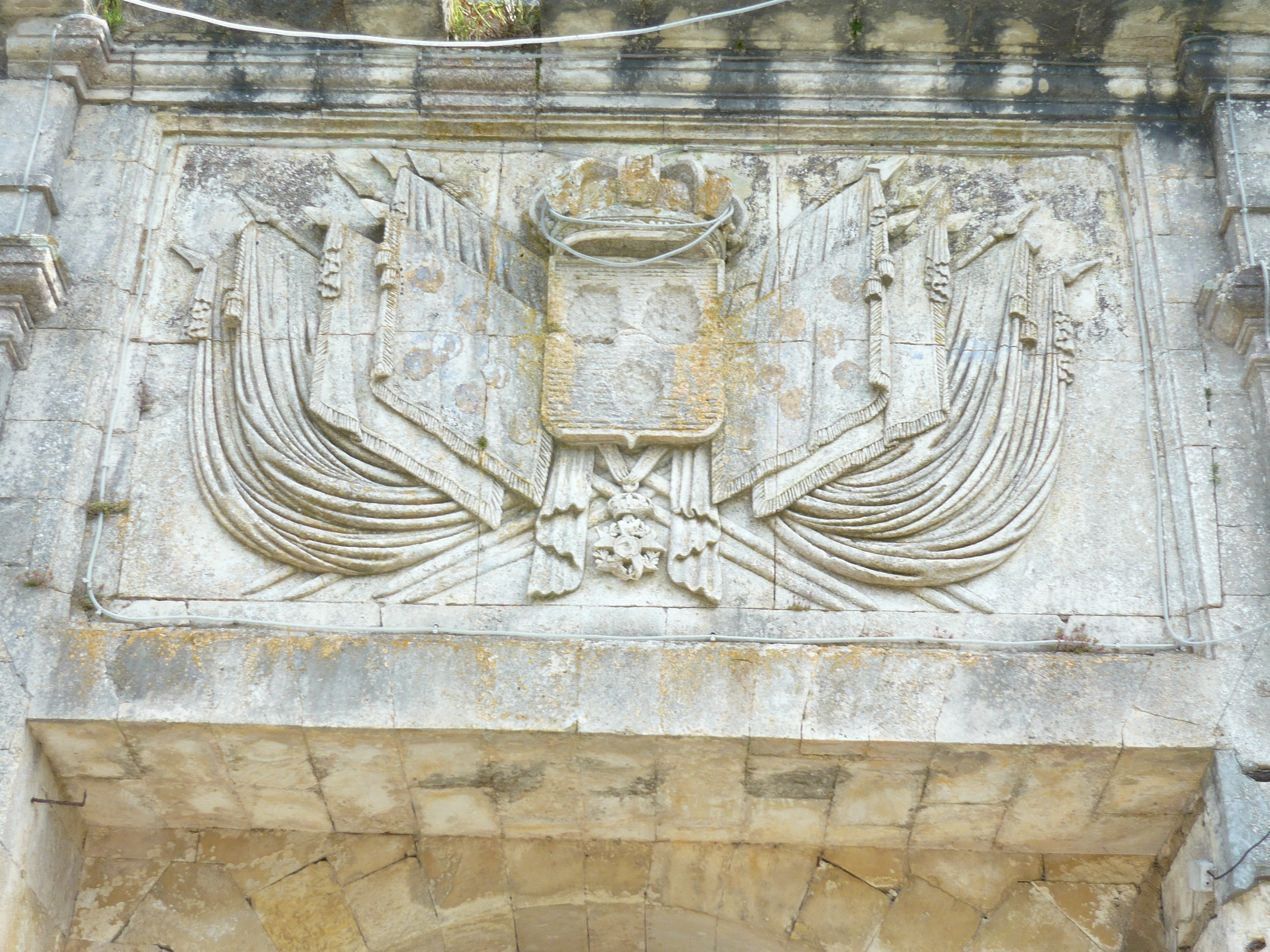
Pediment: Coat of arms with three defaced fleurs-de-lis. Ornaments: royal crown, standards, and Legion of Honour symbols.

== See also ==
- Citadel
- Vauban
- Cardinal Richelieu
- Île d'Oléron
- New France
- French Wars of Religion
- Monument historique (France)
