= Mont Granier =

Limestone mountain of the Chartreuse Mountains, southeastern France

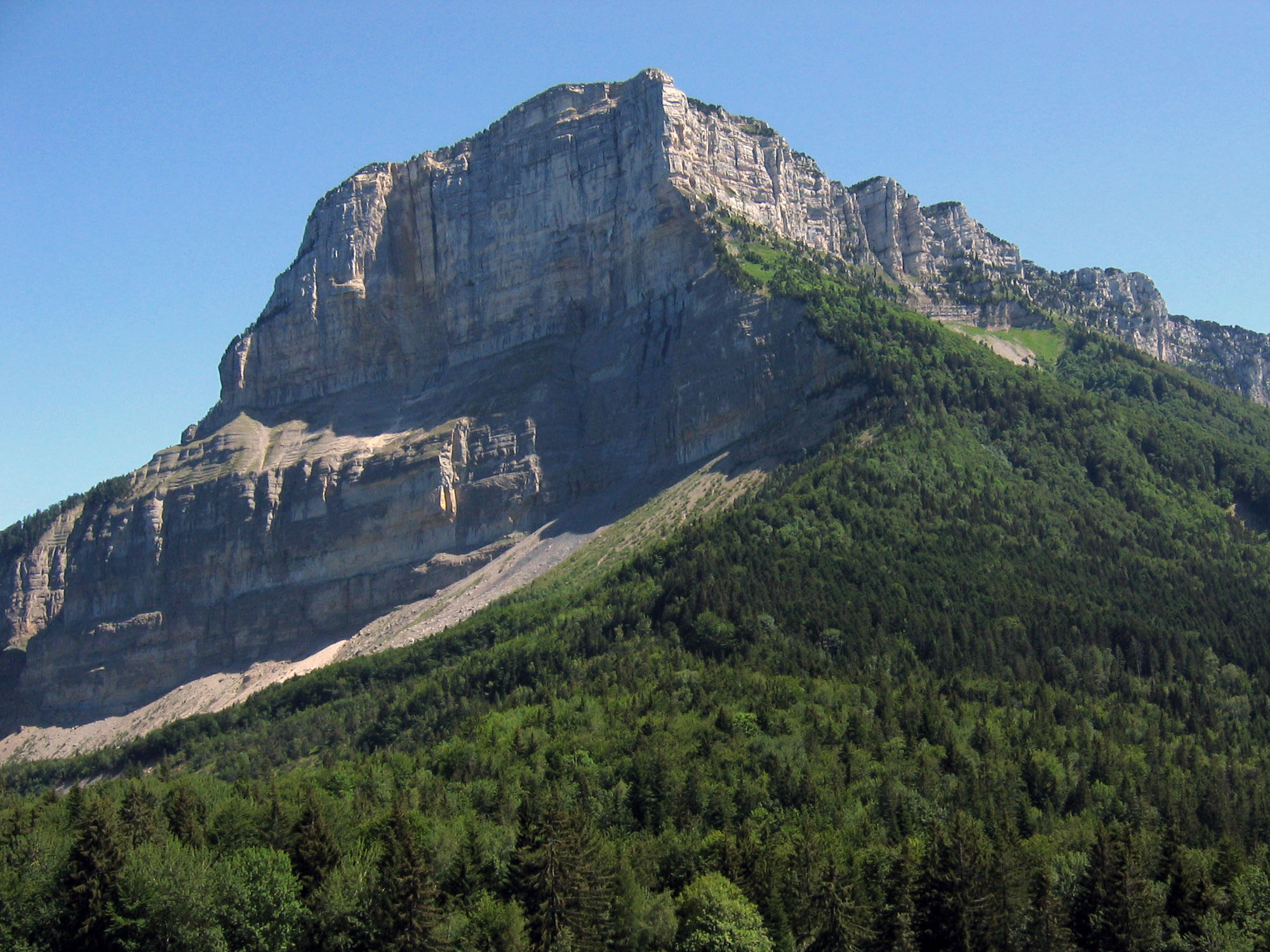

Highest point
- Elevation: 1,933 m (6,342 ft)
- Coordinates: 45°27′53″N 05°55′31″E

Geography
- Location within Alps
- Location: Savoie and Isère, France
- Parent range: Chartreuse Mountains

Topographic map of Mont Granier

Mont Granier (1,933m) is a limestone mountain located between the départements of Savoie and Isère in France. It lies in the Chartreuse Mountains range of the French Prealps between the towns of Chapareillan and Entremont-le-Vieux. Its east face overlooks the valley of Grésivaudan and Combe de Savoie, and the north face overlooks Chambéry. At 900 meters tall, Mont Granier has one of the highest cliffs in France.

== Landslides ==
=== Catastrophic 1248 Landslide ===
In the year 1248, between November 24–25, a mass of limestone resting on marls slid into the valley, causing a massive landslide that destroyed many villages and caused over a thousand casualties, although the numbers are still debated. This event created the sheer 700 m north face of the mountain.

Five villages were partly or completely destroyed by the avalanche:

- Cognin
- Vourey
- Saint-André
- Granier
- Saint-Pérange (also called Saint-Péran)

Two villages were partially destroyed:

- Myans
- Les Murs (Les Marches)

The 1248 Landslide was one of the biggest and deadliest landslides in Europe.

=== January 9, 2016, Landslide ===
In the night of between January 8–9, 2016, a part of the northwest pillar crumbled towards Entremont-le-Vieux, where residents woke up at 5 in the morning. The collapse was of about 70,000 cubic meters of rock. The last debris were stopped by trees within 300 m of the closest houses, lying in the hamlets of Brancaz and Tencovaz.

== Activities ==
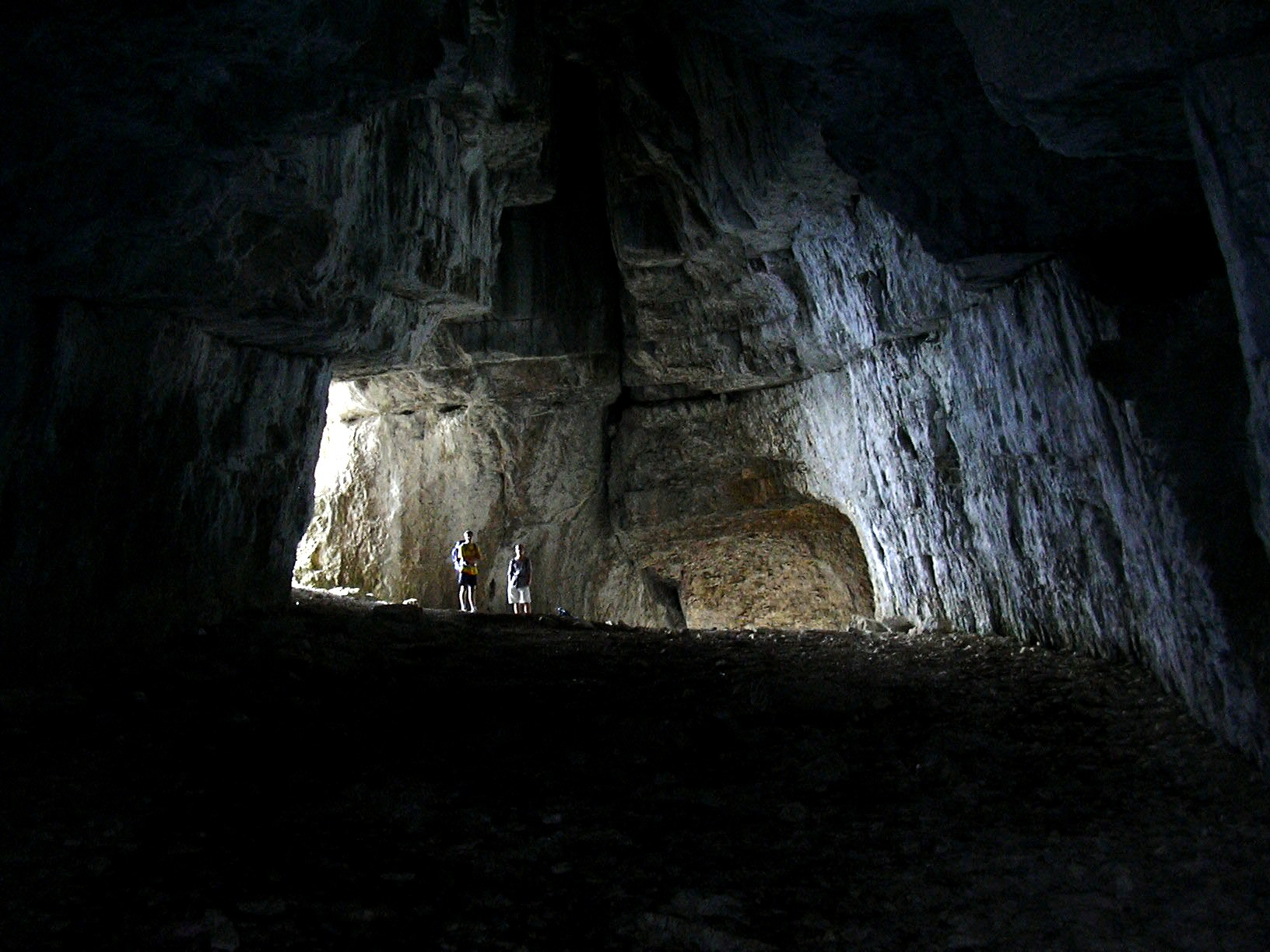
The cave of Balme à Collomb.

It is a popular spot for hiking, caving, rock climbing, and BASE jumping. Around the base of Mont Granier are many vineyards that produce the Apremont and Abymes appellations. These wines are made from the white Jacquère grape, seldom used outside Savoie. The Col du Granier (1,134 m.) crosses the ridge to the north-west of the mountain.

=== Caving ===
454 caves have been identified over an area of 2.8 km2, and form two networks under this small area. To the north, the trou des Auges, ressaut de 108 m, trou des Filous, grotte Arva, and Cuvée des Ours connect with the Granier system, located in the center of the plateau, to form a 55.725 km network over a depth of 635 meters. The latter consists of the Gros trou Bib, trou des Panaches, gouffre des Myriades, Étoile du Berger, trou Lilou and trou Mathieu for its main cavities. To the south, the system Balme à Collomb-grotte des Pincherins of 8,336 metres (27,349 ft) for 283 metres (928 ft) of elevation gain, now well known for its cave bear deposit has to date not been connected to the Granier system. On November 13, 1988, cavers Pierre Guichebaron and Marc Papet discovered an extension to the Balme à Collomb cave on the west side of the mountain at an altitude of 5,577 feet (1,700 meters) that contained the skeletons of over 1,000 cave bears that date between 24,000 and 45,000 years. The current Granier massif is a remnant of a previously larger plateau reduced by erosion.
