= Le Désert d'Entremont =

Winter sports resort in Entremont-le-Vieux, France

Le Desert d'Entremont
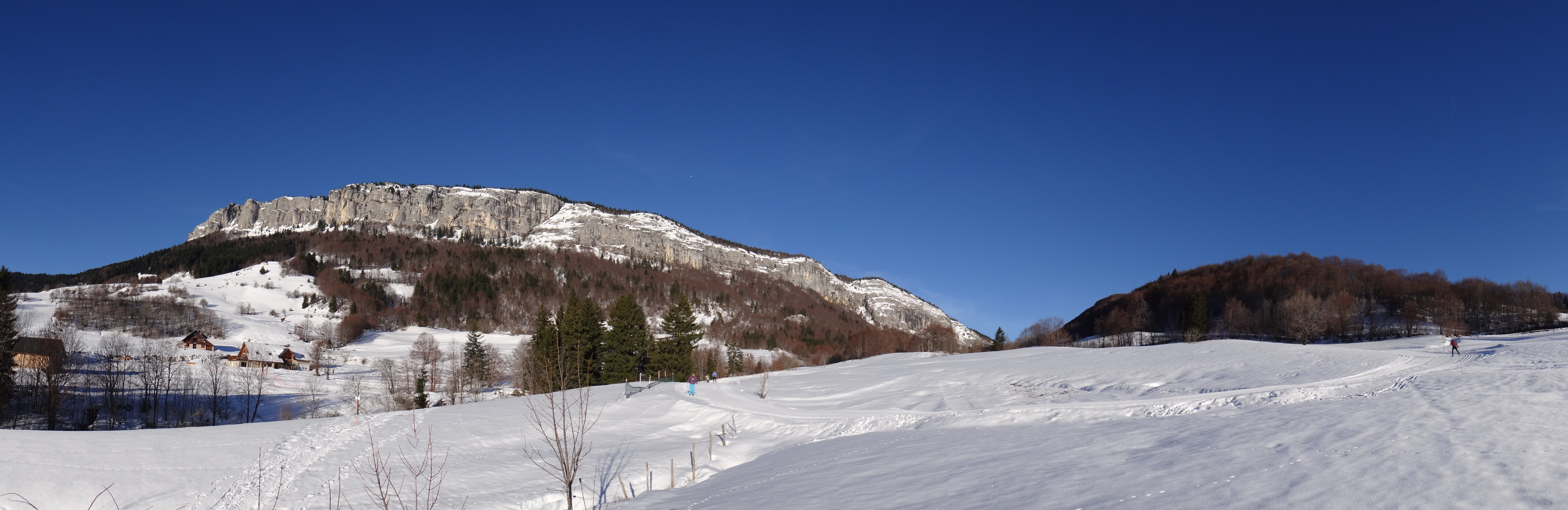
- Desert panorama

- Location within France Location within Auvergne-Rhône-Alpes Location within Alps
- Location: Entremont-le-Vieux, Savoie, Auvergne-Rhône-Alpes, France
- Nearest city: Chambéry
- Coordinates: 45°27′47″N 5°51′56″E
- Top elevation: 1,200 m (3,900 ft)
- Base elevation: 1,450 m (4,760 ft)
- Trails: 6 (2 green, 2 blue, 1 red & 1 black)

Le Desert d'Entremont is a winter sports resort in the commune of Entremont-le-Vieux located in the Chartreuse Mountains. It lies between the communes of Entremont-le-Vieux and Corbel.

== Introduction ==
In winter, with presence of snow, we can practice downhill skiing, cross country skiing, sled, snowshoes, etc.

== History ==
The ski station was built in 1968.

== Events ==
Cross country skiing nights are sometimes organized. The tracks are lighted during the events.
