= Entremont-le-Vieux =

Entremont-le-Vieux Entremont-le-Viûx (Arpitan)
- Commune
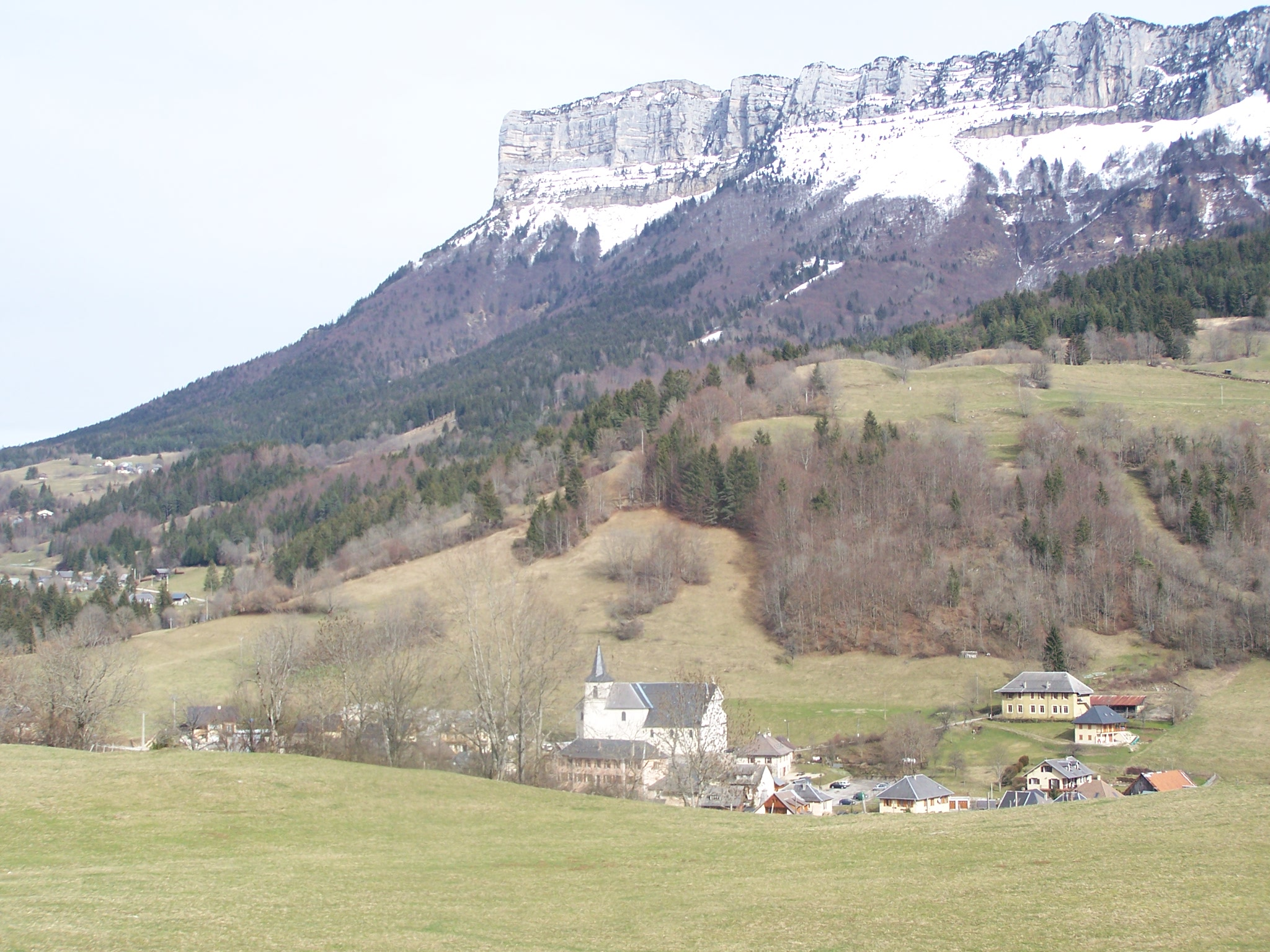
- A view of Entremont-le-Vieux behind Mont Granier
- Location of Entremont-le-Vieux
- Location within France Location within Auvergne-Rhône-Alpes
- Coordinates: 45°27′03″N 5°53′08″E
- Country: France
- Region: Auvergne-Rhône-Alpes
- Department: Savoie
- Arrondissement: Chambéry
- Canton: Le Pont-de-Beauvoisin
- Intercommunality: CC Cœur de Chartreuse

Government
  - Mayor (2020–2026): Anne Lenfant
- Area^{1}: 33.01 km^{2} (12.75 sq mi)
- Highest elevation: 1,934 m (6,345 ft)
- Lowest elevation: 755 m (2,477 ft)
- Population (2023): 648
  - Density: 19.6/km^{2} (50.8/sq mi)
- Time zone: UTC+01:00 (CET)
  - Summer (DST): UTC+02:00 (CEST)
- INSEE/Postal code: 73107 /73670
- ^{1} French Land Register data, which excludes lakes, ponds, glaciers > 1 km^{2} (0.386 sq mi or 247 acres) and river estuaries.

Entremont-le-Vieux (French pronunciation: [ɑ̃tʁəmɔ̃ lə vjø]; Arpitan: Entremont-le-Viûx) is a commune in the Savoie department in the Auvergne-Rhône-Alpes region in Southeastern France. As of 2023, the population of the commune was 648.

== Geography ==
Entremont-le-Vieux is a landlocked village close to many water streams and winter sports resorts (including Le Désert d'Entremont). It is mainly the Cozon river and its tributaries that flow into the valley that have shaped the landscape. One of the main features of the town is the dispersion of a set of houses in 26 villages. The main passes located in the town are the col de la Cluse, the col du Cucheron southwest and the col du Mollard northwest.

=== Neighboring municipalities ===
Neighboring communes of Entremont-le-Vieux are Saint-Pierre d'Entremont in Savoie, Sainte-Marie-du-Mont, Saint-Jean-de-Couz and Corbel.

== History ==
The parish of Notre-Dame d'Epernay is the lordship of the Entremonts valley.

The church of Entremont-le-Vieux, Notre-Dame d'Epernay, was rebuilt in the mid-19th century to its present location, largely to accommodate the 1,800 people of this time. A fire destroyed the building in 1653. The church was renovated in 1844. Ravaged partly in 1995, the tower and the bells (which dated from 1654) have been completely redone.

In 1934, a creamerie was built at Entremont-le-Vieux the renowned Fruitière des Entremonts (for milk, cheese and local products).

In 1988, the Ursus spelaeus was discovered inside a cave on the slopes of the Massif du Granier, which is one of the most important archaeological sites of cave bears. This discovery has led to extensive research on the existence of these animals in the valley.

=== Trivia ===
Entremont-le-Vieux was formerly called Epernay. This name was retained to designate the village, even today, for many inhabitants of the town.

== Population and society ==
=== Cultural events and festivities ===
Each year at the end of August, a peasants and artisans party takes place at Entremont-le-Vieux. We notice at this festivity the presence of many artisans of the Entremonts valley district. The festival usually takes place during a single day, often on a Sunday.

=== Sports ===
==== Winter sports ====
- In the commune of Entremont-le-Vieux are located two winter sports resorts: Le Désert d'Entremont west and the Granier en Chartreuse northeast.

==== Cycling ====
- The Tour de France spent several times by Entremont-le-Vieux by the D912.

=== Media ===
- Local TV: France 3 Alpes, TV8 Mont-Blanc
- Local radio stations: France Bleu Pays de Savoie, Radio Couleur Chartreuse

=== Personalities ===
- Robert Montbel
- Amédée V

== Sights ==
- The Museum of the Cave Bear (Ursus spelaeus)

== See also ==
- Communes of the Savoie department
