= Charmant Som =

Mountain in Isère, France

Coordinates: 45°19′30″N 5°45′51″E

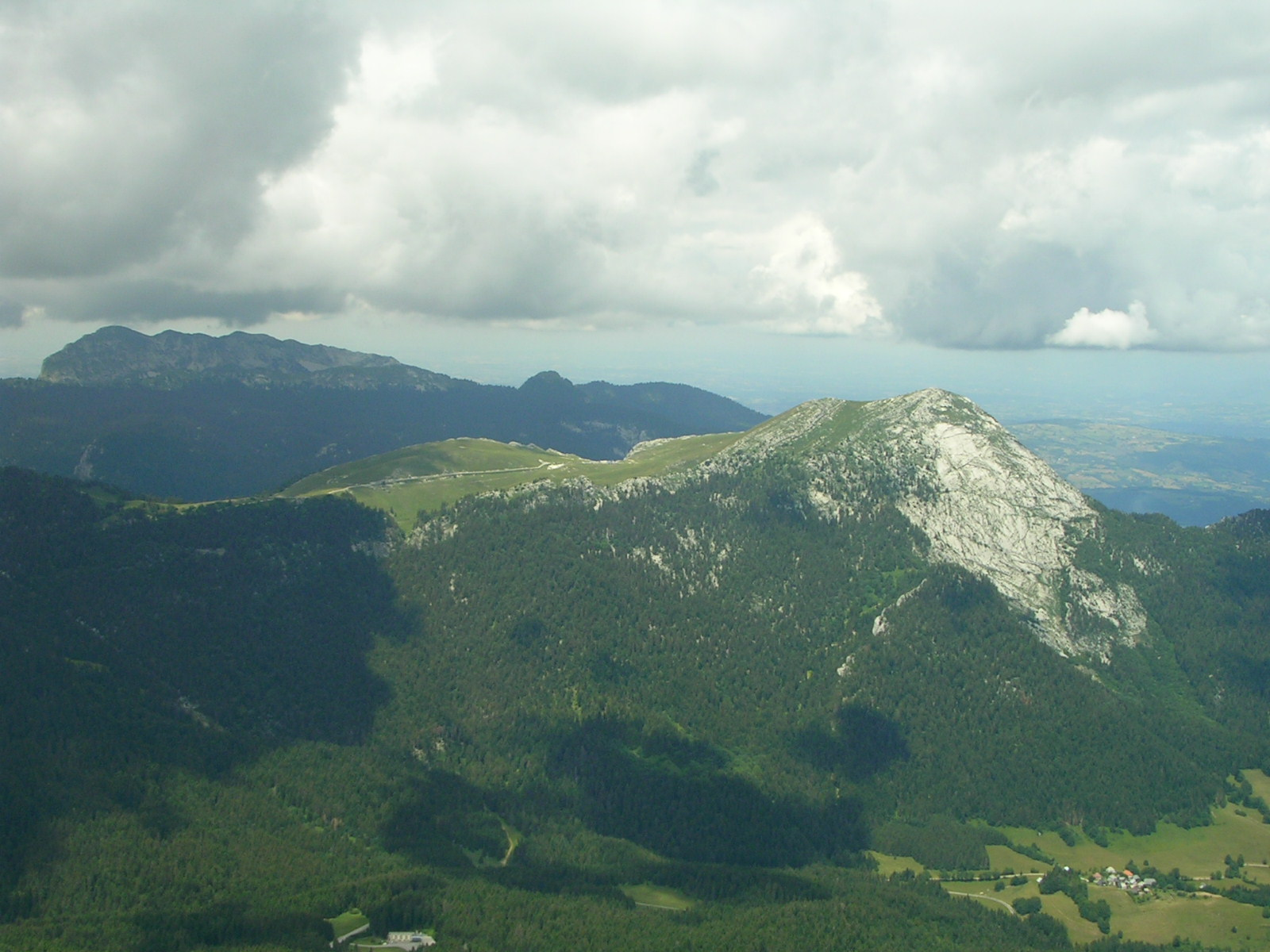
- View of Charmant Som from the summit of Chamechaude

Highest point
- Elevation: 1,867 m (6,125 ft)

Geography
- Country: France

Charmant Som is a mountain in the French department of Isère, rising to 1,867 metres (6,125 ft) in the Chartreuse Mountains in the Alps. It is made up of limestone, but its relief is less pronounced than that of the surrounding mountains, which is why it is covered with alpine meadows, the origin of its name. These have been occupied and tended by shepherds since the Middle Ages. They are accessible via a road built between the two world wars from the Col de Porte to 200 metres (660 ft) below the main summit. The road leads to two buildings serving as inn, chalet and cheese dairy.

The mountain is part of the Chartreuse Regional Nature Park, a Natural area of ecological, faunal and floristic interest (ZNIEFF by its acronym in French) and a Natura 2000 zone. These protected areas are designed to preserve biodiversity. However, they are also ideal for hiking, speleology (which began to develop in the 1960s, followed by skiing in the late 1970s), cycling, climbing and paragliding.

== Toponymy ==
This topographic toponym designating a mountain is an oronym.

It was attested as Charmencson in 1357, Charmenson in 1540, Chalmenson in the Titres de la Grande Chartreuse in the 17th century, Charmanson in 1700 (Réformation des forêts, II) and 1725 (new Titres de la Grande Chartreuse), Charmant Som on the Cassini map in the 18th century.

The name Charmant Som represents the alteration of a Chalmenson type, composed of the Latin summus "highest point" (> som[me] + -et > "summit") associated with the prelatin calmis (possibly Gallic) and meaning "mountain pasture, above the forest limit, grassy summit, often of difficult access and sparse vegetation", hence the regional words chalm, chaume "bare height, pasture"; charme "summit pasture, uncultivated land". On the other hand, the etymology of the word "thatch", in "thatched roof", is different: it can be explained by the classical Latin calamus "reed".

== Geography ==
=== Location ===
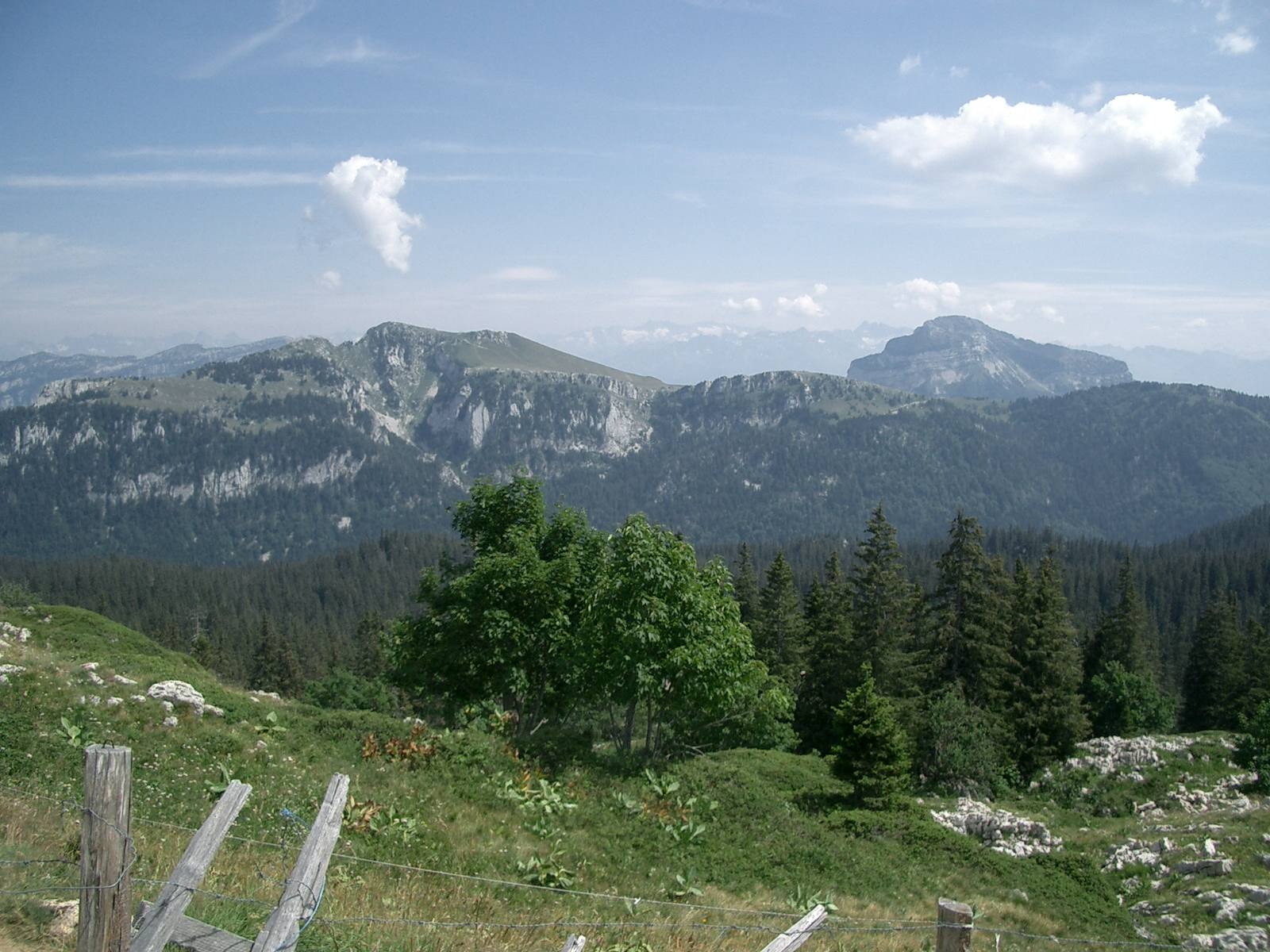
View of Charmant Som and Chamechaude (right) from the Col de la Grande Vache to the west

Charmant Som is located in southeastern France, in the Auvergne-Rhône-Alpes region and the Isère département, in the commune of Saint-Pierre-de-Chartreuse. It lies some 15 km (9.3 mi) north of Grenoble and almost 100 km (62 mi) southeast of Lyon. It is part of the pre-Alpine Chartreuse Mountains.

It is surrounded by La Grande Sure (1,920 m; 6,300 ft) to the west, La Pinéa (1,771 m; 5,810 ft) on the same ridgeline to the southwest, Chamechaude (2,082 m; 6,831 ft) to the southeast, the Roc d'Arguille (1,768 m; 5,801 ft) to the east and the Grand Som (2,026 m; 6,647 ft) to the northeast.

=== Topography ===
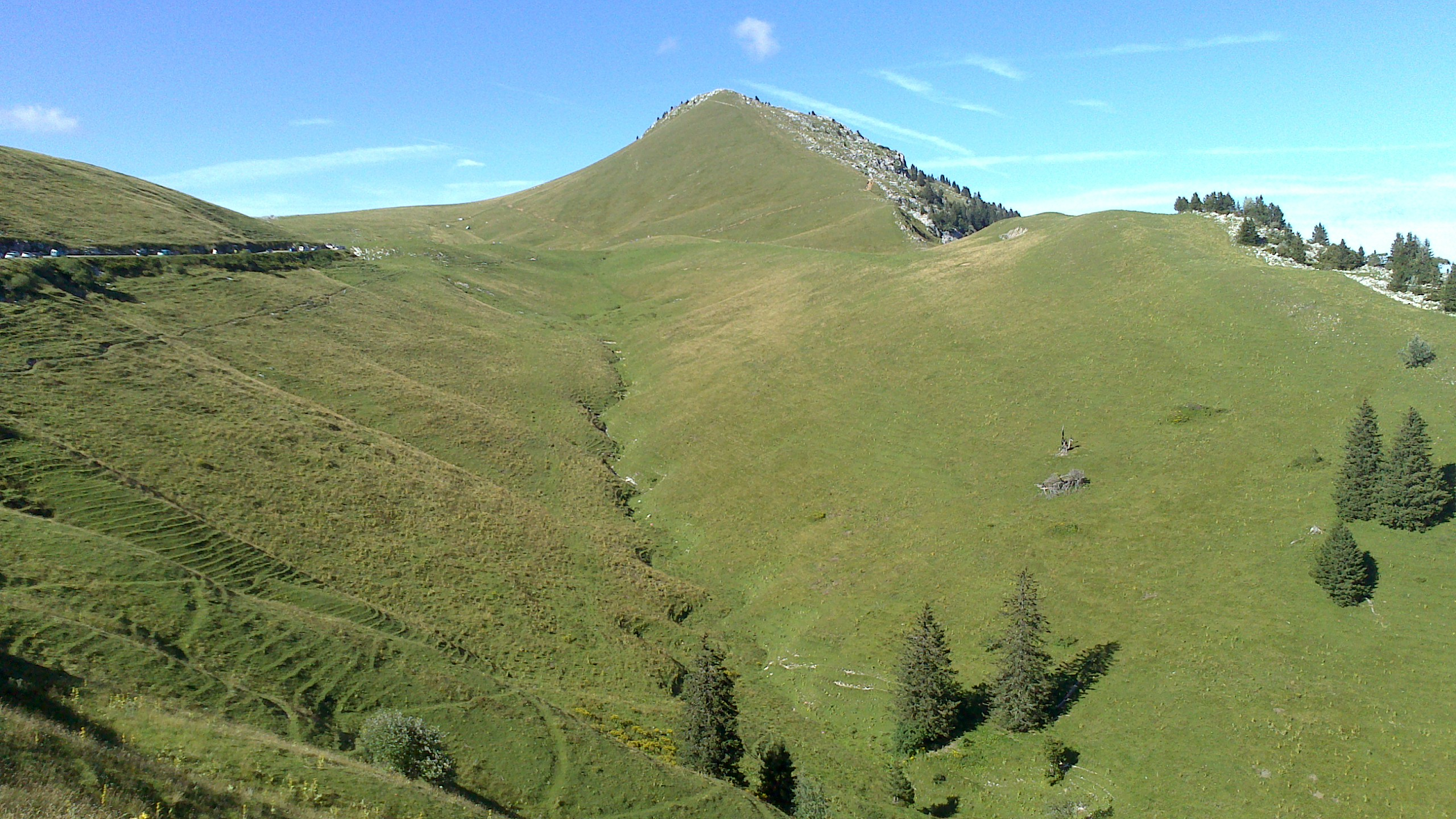
View of the mountain pastures and the southern antecima of Charmant Som from the south

The summit rises to an altitude of 1,867 metres (6,125 ft). At its foot are the Col de la Charmette (1,261 m; 4,137 ft) to the west, the Col de Porte (1,326 m; 4,350 ft) to the south and the Gorges du Guiers Mort to the north.

The Charmant Som is shaped like a "Y". The junction of its three branches is formed by a rocky dome cut off to the north by cliffs forming the Promontory. The Chamechine ridge to the northwest shelters the Combe de l'If. To the northeast is the Bérard ridge. The southern branch, known as the Canaple ridge, has a gentler slope and is home to alpine pastures to which the D57d departmental road leads from the Col de Porte.

=== Geology ===
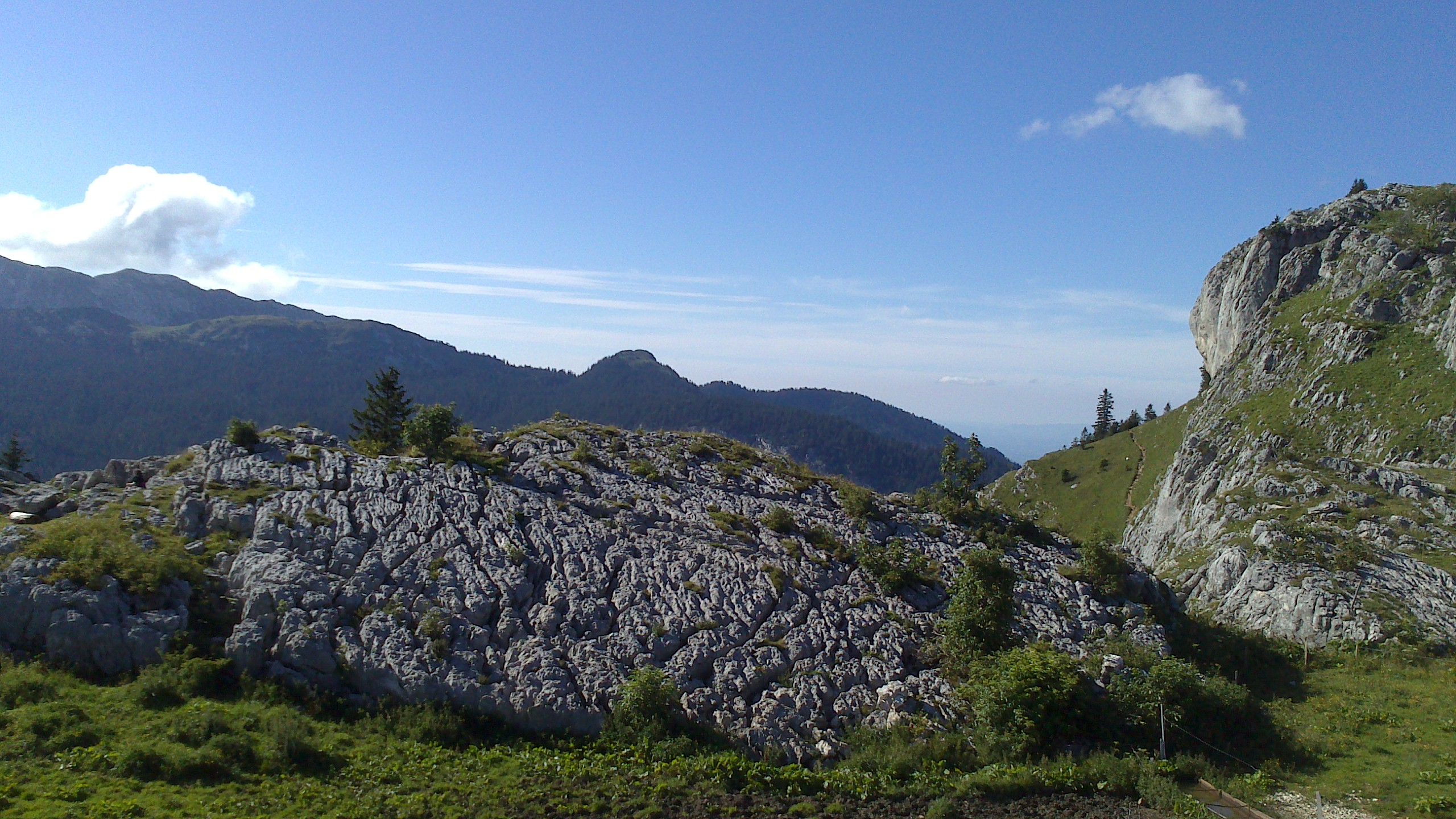
Urgonian limestone karstification behind the cheese dairy

Unlike most Chartreuse mountains, Charmant Som is not a sharp crest, but a rounded mountain formed by the massif's median anticline. The three ridges and the summit are made of Urgonian limestone. Near the chalets to the south of the summit, in the dip, the Urgonian is covered by remnants of Senonian. To the north, in the anticlinal fold between the Chamechine ridge and the Bérard ridge, erosion has uncovered older layers: Hauterivian, then Fontanil limestone, Berriasian marly rock and Tithonic limestone.

=== Climate ===
The Chartreuse Mountains are subject to an oceanic mountain climate. It acts as a barrier to the prevailing westerly winds from the Atlantic Ocean, and thus receives a large amount of precipitation, with a peak in early spring and another in early autumn. A third of this precipitation comes in the form of snow. As a result, the snowpack at the Col de Porte (1,326 m; 4,350 ft) is around one metre (3.3 ft) thick at the end of February, but reached record heights of 200 to 230 centimetres (6.6 to 7.5 ft) for the same period in 1979, 1982 and 1985. However, average snow cover, which has halved over the last fifty years, has averaged fifty centimetres (1.6 ft) over the last ten years. Since the 2000s, snow has averaged 150 days a year on the Col de Porte, thirty days less than in the 1960s; the presence of a snowpack greater than one meter has declined by an average of fifteen days every ten years over the same period. This observation coincides with a 1.4 °C (2.5 °F) rise in temperatures over the last half-century, from 1 December to 30 April.

=== Fauna and flora ===
Mammals include the chamois and chiropterans: the Western barbastelle, the Northern bat and the Brown long-eared bat. There is also evidence of the presence of the Eurasian lynx. Roe deer, wild boar and red deer frequent the central Chartreuse. Bird species at Charmant Som include the Golden Eagle, Wallcreeper, Alpine chough and Black Grouse. The Rosalia longicorn is a protected species of beetle.

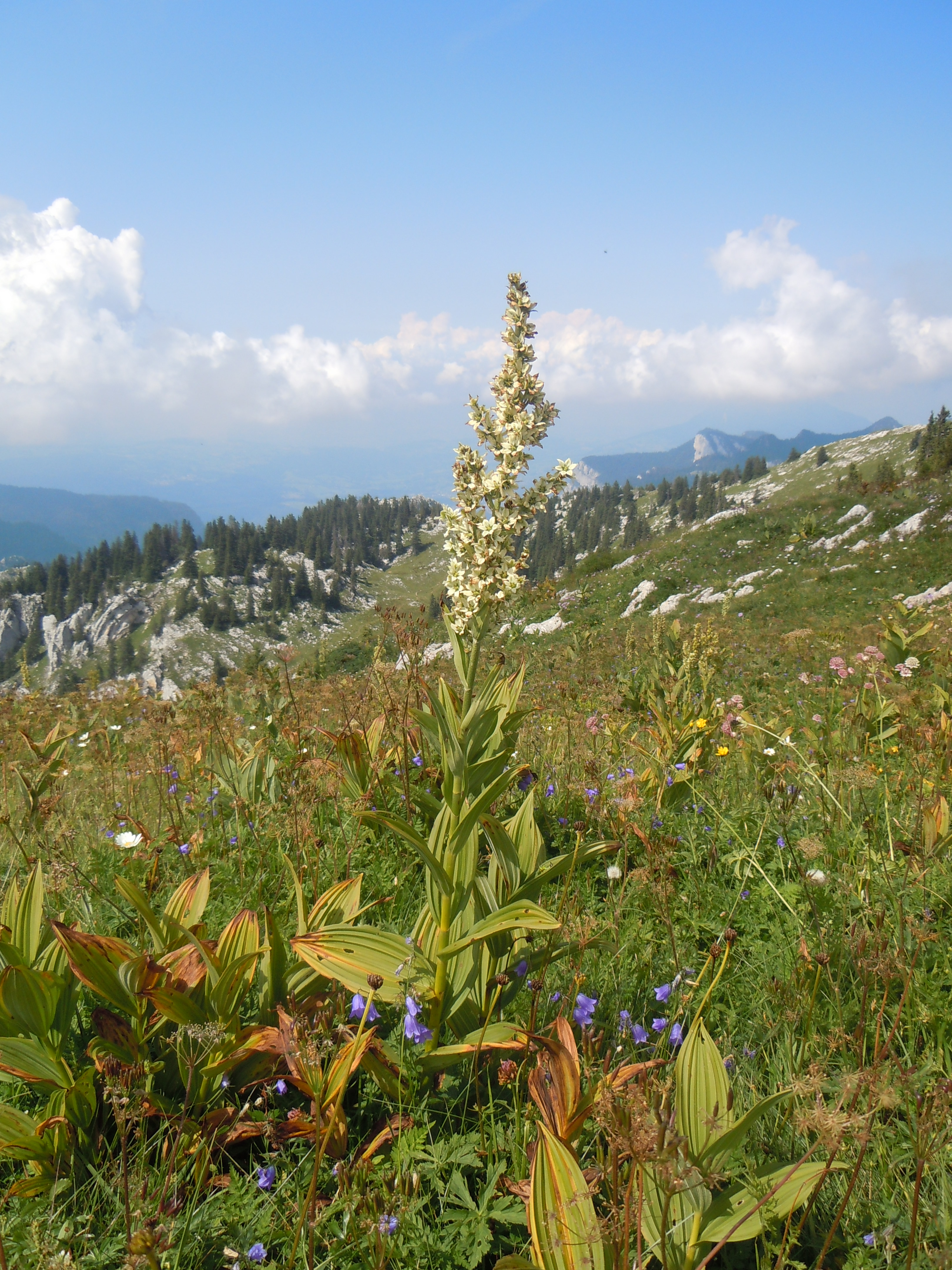
Veratrum album in the Charmant Som mountain pastures; often confused with Gentiana lutea when dry, it is toxic to both humans and livestock, although small quantities are eaten in autumn.

The rocky outcrops and forests of sycamore maple and Norway spruce are remarkable for their floristic diversity, and are home to some rare protected species. These include the Cypripedium calceolus. Other species found in these environments include the Aconitum anthora, the Aconitum variegatum, the Allium victorialis, the Arabis serpyllifolia, the Bupleurum longifolium, the Campanula latifolia, the Centranthus angustifolius, the Chrysosplenium oppositifolium, the Circaea alpina, the Clematis alpina, the Cystopteris montana, the Daphne alpina, the Galium obliquum, the Galium pseudohelveticum, the Gentiana cruciata, the Gymnadenia odoratissima, the Helictotrichon setaceum, the Hieracium lawsonii, the Hypericum nummularium, the Impatiens noli-tangere, the Laserpitium gallicum, the Limodorum abortivum, the Neottia cordata, the Lunaria rediviva, the Minuartia capillacea, the Orobanche laserpitii-sileris, the Peucedanum carvifolium, the Polystichum aculeatum, the Polystichum setiferum, the Potentilla nitida, the Primula auricula, the Rhodiola rosea, the Saxifraga muscoides, and the Tozzia alpina. The Viola calcarata, the Narcissus pseudonarcissus, the Dactylorhiza sambucina, the Trollius europaeus, the Gymnadenia nigra, the Lilium martagon, the Gentiana angustifolia, and the Veratrum album usually bloom on the 200 hectares of alpine pastures, which are maintained by pastoralism.

== History ==
In the Middle Ages, Charmant Som was first owned by the Bonnevaux Abbey, founded in what is now the commune of Villeneuve-de-Marc, which made a short transhumance to the mountain from the Terres froides. It was then ceded to the Grande Chartreuse, a few decades after its foundation in 1084 in the Saint-Bruno valley, opposite the Charmant Som. The alpine pastures were cleared for grazing. The Orgeval oratory, dedicated to Saint Peter, was built around 1535 to mark the southern boundary of the monastery's possessions. Following the French Revolution in 1790, the mountain pasture became biens nationaux (national property), and was sold to the Grenoble hospice in 1807. The presence of a summit cross is attested as early as 1902. After World War I, it was bought by the National Forests Office, who leased it by adjudication to Provençal shepherds, who re-established transhumance, resulting in the temporary loss of local cheese production.

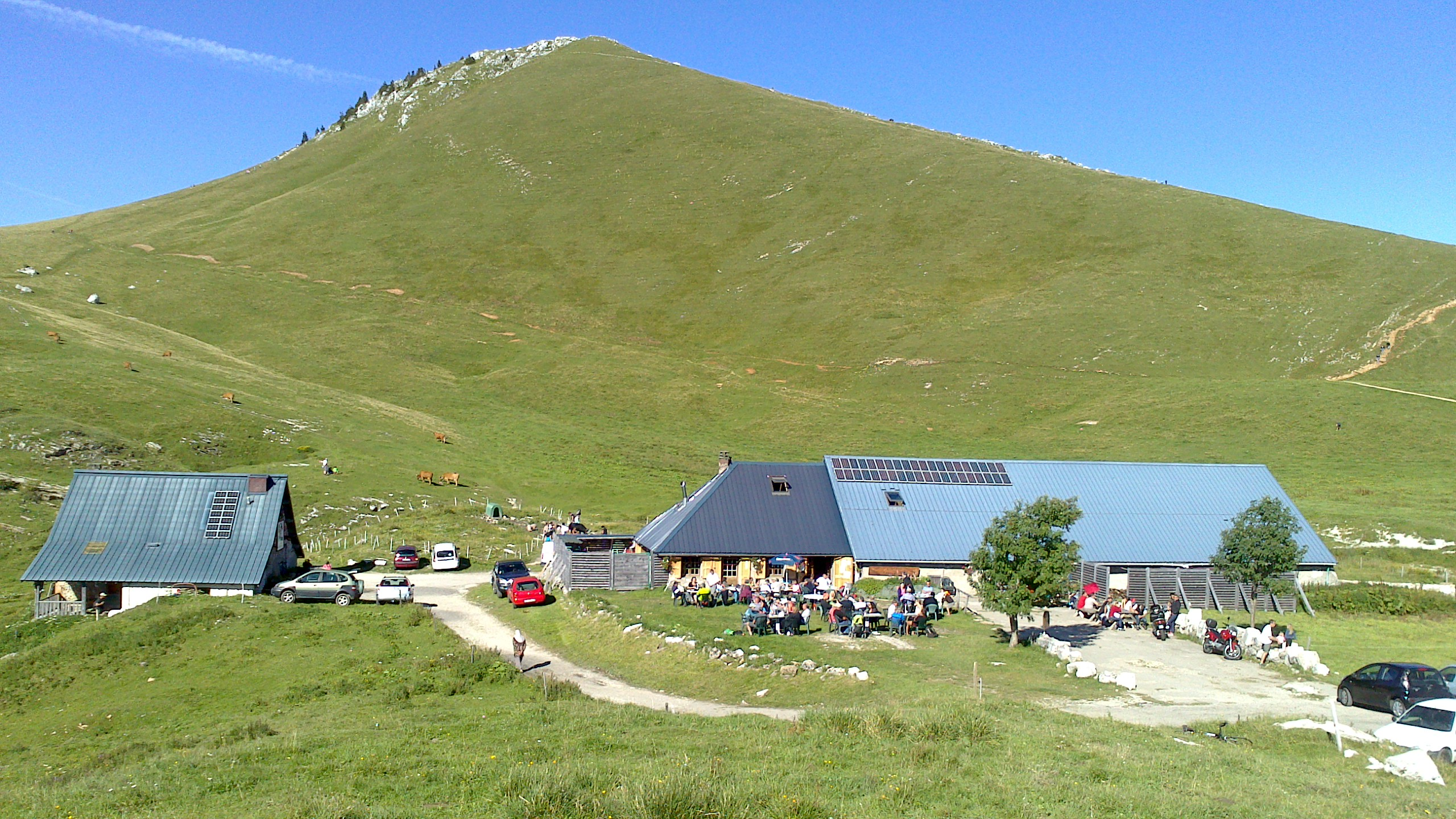
Contemporary view of the Charmant Som chalets below the southern antecima

However, between 1932 and 1937, these same shepherds took advantage of the opportunity to build the current road in place of the old mule track leading to the mountain pastures. The Touring club de France, present in Saint-Pierre-de-Chartreuse since the founding of a tourist office in 1905 and encouraged by the commune's classification as a health resort, helped to make the road viable. He also took over a large part of the former haberts to transform them into a chalet, inaugurated in September 1937.

In 1941, in the midst of the scarcity caused by World War II, the National Forests Office decided to lease the mountain pastures to an entrepreneur from Les Adrets, who immediately handed over management to a resident of Theys, with the cattle being driven from these two Dauphiné villages at the foot of the Belledonne to the Chartreuse Mountains. At the same time, Jeunesse et Montagne and Chantiers de la jeunesse française camps were set up at Charmant Som, Col de Porte and Malamille. Initially supported by the Vichy France regime, these camps became part of the Resistance at the end of the war, taking in those who had refused Compulsory Work Service (STO) and joined the Maquis.

The Criska chasm was discovered in 1962 with the help of the eponymous dog of the Speleo-club cartusien, then explored by a member of the Grenoble Speleos of the Fédération Française des clubs alpins et de montagne (FFCAM by its acronym in French). Over the next three years, a depth of 230 metres (750 ft) was reached. During the summer of 1967 and spring of 1968, the Fontaine-La Tronche Speleo-group had to deal with a number of obturations, artificially widening the cave by blasting. Over the following months, they explored at depth, reaching 700 metres (2,300 ft). In 1969, bad weather forced speleology to explore the upper part of the network, linking the Criska chasm with the Vire cave, the Escalade shaft, the Corneilles shaft and the Aura shaft, which became the highest entrance in the network, at 1,614 metres (5,295 ft). Finally, on 27 September 1970, the final depth of 740 metres (2,430 ft) was reached; the upper part of the network was de-equipped. The chasm was renamed Kriska Well. In 1976, the Ded network, named after André Méozzi, was one of the twenty deepest caves in the world.

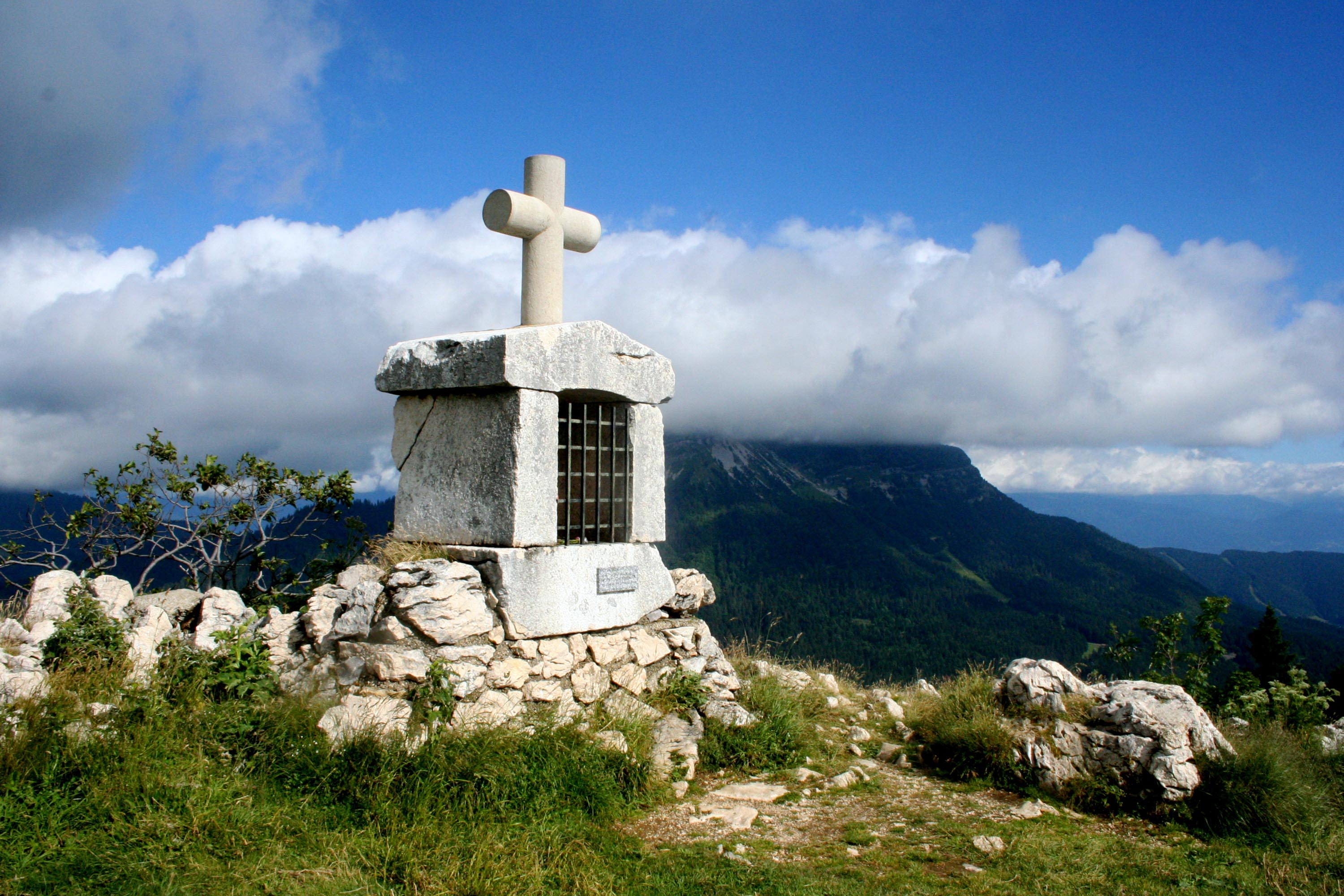
View of the Orgeval oratory, with Chamechaude in the cloudy background

A three-seater chairlift was installed in 1978. Built by Poma with a fixed-attachment system, it was one of the first of its kind in France. It is 1,763 metres (5,784 ft) long and has a vertical drop of 502 metres (1,647 ft), with the arrival station close to the southern end of the mountain pastures, above the Canaple valley. Although attached to the Col de Porte ski area, it is located entirely within the commune of Saint-Pierre-de-Chartreuse. Due to a lack of investment and after several vandalism incidents, operations ceased in the mid-2000s; unlike the rest of the Col de Porte resort, the chairlift was not reopened in 2009.

In 1992, the Orgeval oratory was restored and moved to the side of the road, where it leads out of the forest into the mountain pastures. Finally, in 1993, the Charmant Som mountain pasture was taken over by Savoyard farmers. The summit cross escaped the wave of vandalism suffered by many crosses in the Chartreuse Mountains in early 2000 and December 2001, and was replaced in 2006.

== Activities ==
=== Economy ===
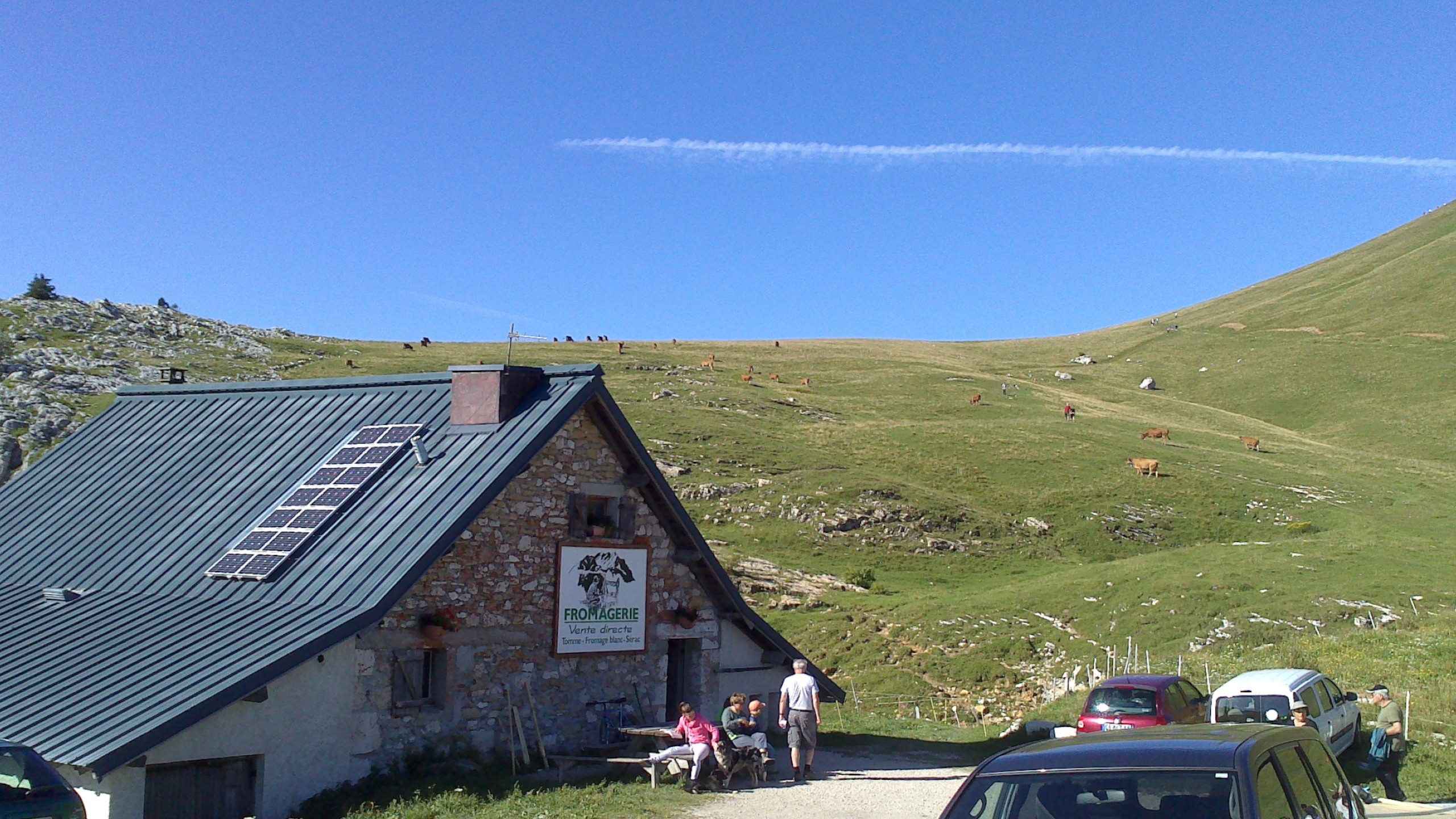
View of the cheese dairy and cattle in the background

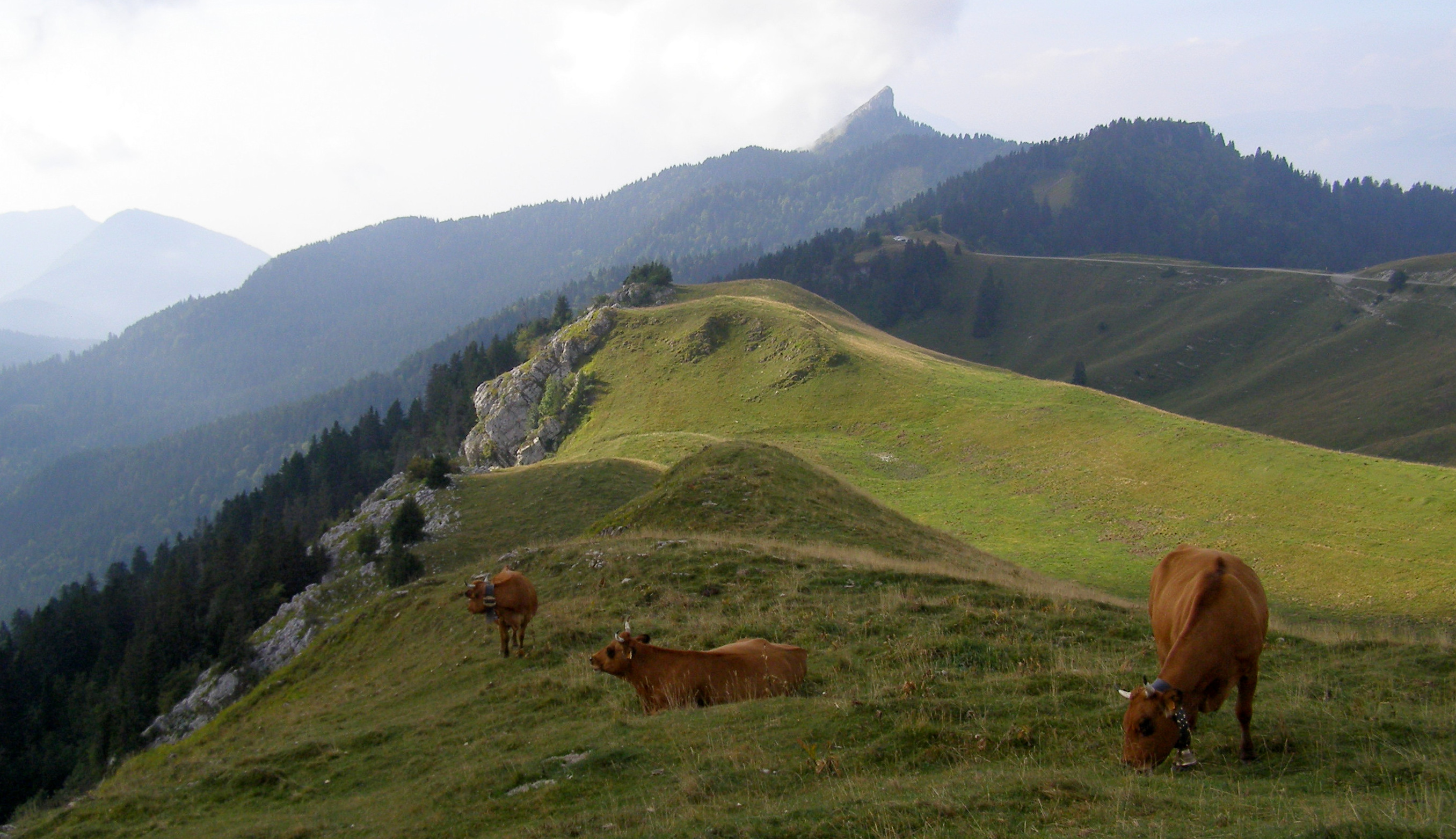
View of a mountain pasture with a few cows on the southern ridge of Charmant Som

The inn at the summit of Charmant Som is operated by cattle breeders from June to the end of September. The cattle graze alternately in four different pens and generally do not require the supervision of a shepherd; they number between 60 and 80 Tarentaise cows, providing an average of 800 litres (180 imp gal; 210 US gal) of milk. In the absence of a spring, water is brought in by tanker. The milk is processed directly into cheese. Serac, once considered a "poor man's cheese", is making a strong comeback and can be eaten as a salad. Tomme baujue and faisselle cheese are also produced. Around 70% of production is consumed by tourists, who are served a meal at the inn, or sold directly at the cheese dairy.

=== Hiking ===
The classic hiking route starts at the Chalets du Charmant Som, at the end of the D57d departmental road accessible from the Col de Porte. In summer, they offer around 50 beds; in winter, the cowshed remains open and guests can sleep on the straw. The path leads smoothly up the southern ridge above the mountain pastures to the southern antecima. Two hundred metres (660 ft) separate it from the main summit. The trail, used by between 10,000 and 20,000 people every year, was upgraded in 2007 to prevent soil erosion. From the chalets, the old path leads to the summit, passing to the west below the antecima, then up through scree slopes into a small combe.

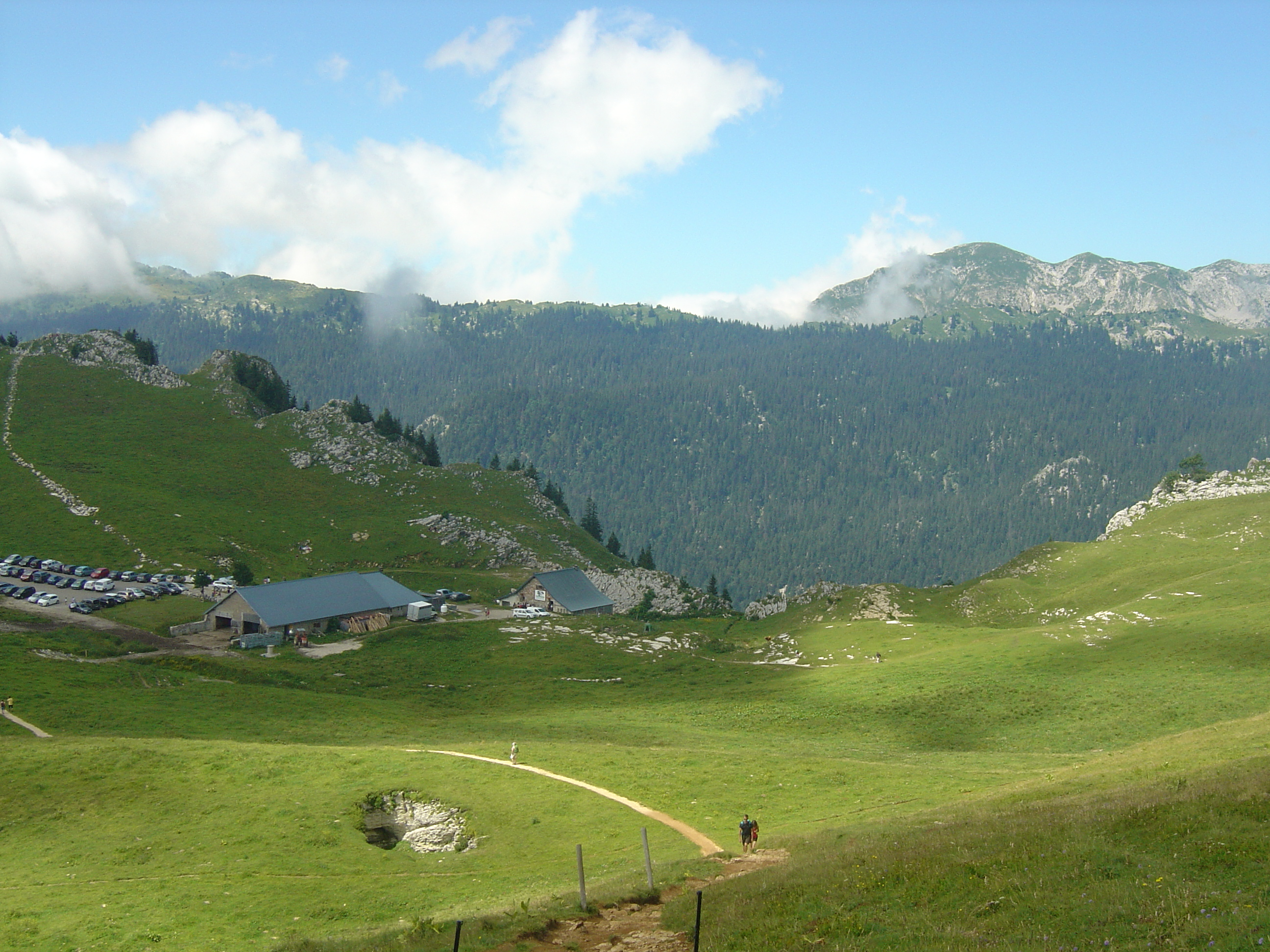
View of the chalets from the classic path

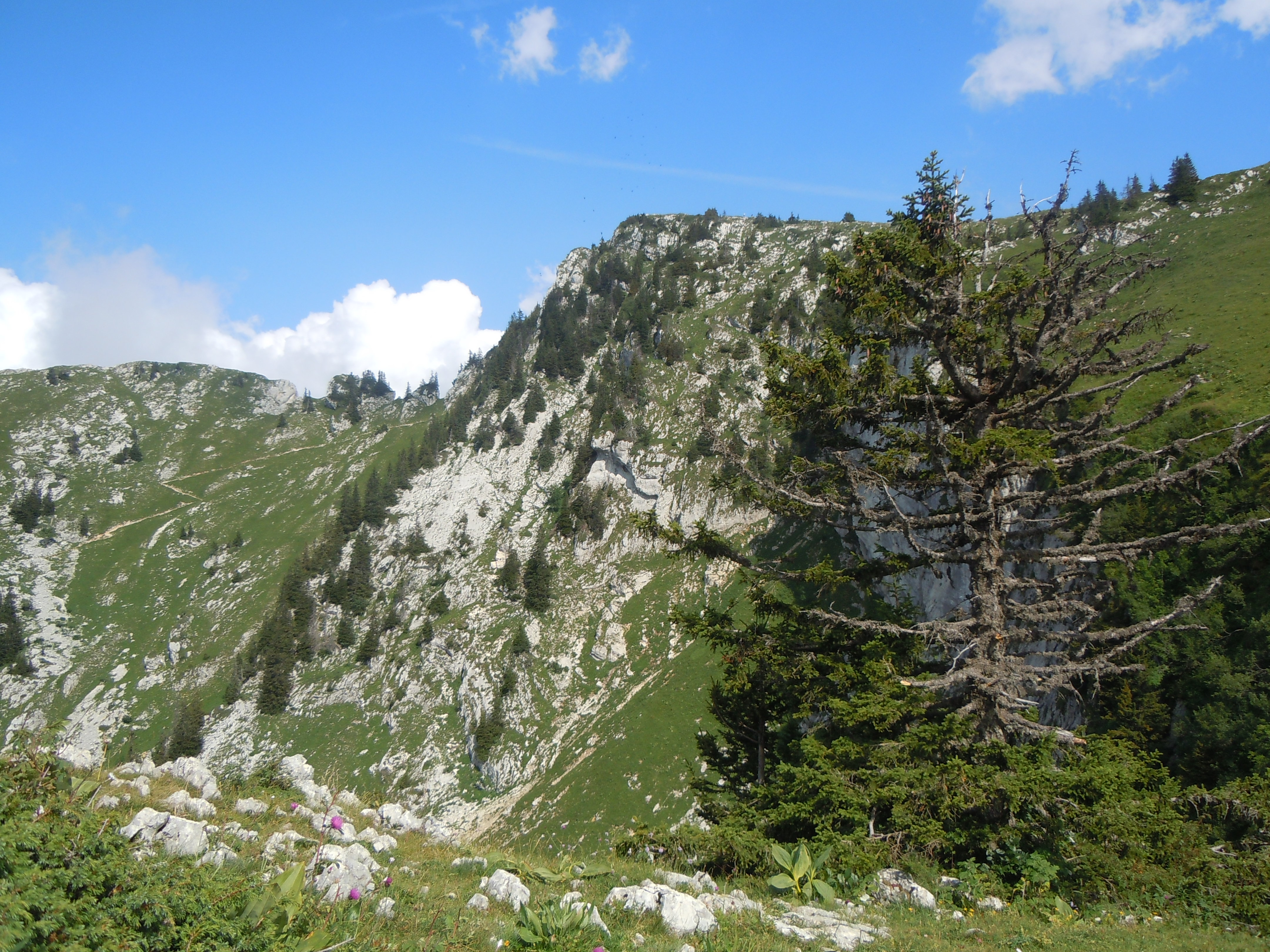
View of the alternative trail from the west

Three footpaths lead up to the road near the Oratoire d'Orgeval, in the mountain pastures to the south: from the Col de la Charmette via Le Fournel on the western slope, from the Col de Porte via the GR Tour de Chartreuse across the northeastern flank of La Pinéa and along the Balme de l'Air on the southern ridge, or from the hamlet of Les Cottaves on the eastern slope.

From the north-east, the ascent is via the Collet, then across the slabs of the east face to the main path leading to the antecima and summit. Le Collet can be reached either to the north from the Valombré valley, or to the northeast via an unmarked path along the Bérard ridge, or to the east via the GR Tour de Chartreuse from the hamlet of La Martinière, which can also be reached from the hamlet of Les Revols. The Frettevieille hut, above La Martinière, can be used as a rough shelter with straw provided.

=== Other sporting activities ===
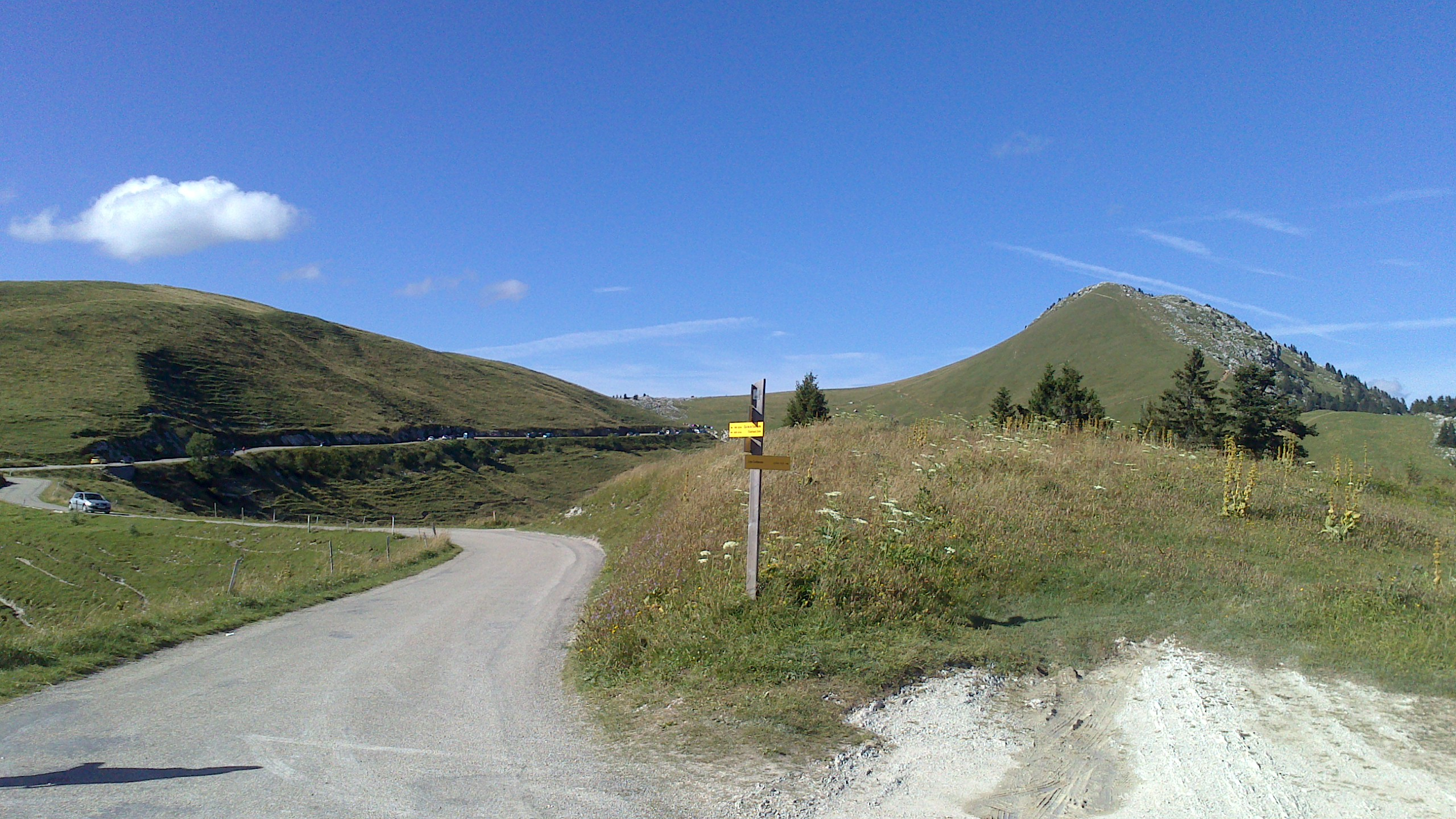
View of the Charmant Som road as you leave the forest

The ascent to the chalets by bike, via the D57d departmental road from the Col de Porte, is 5.6 km (3.5 mi) long, of which almost 4.5 km (2.8 mi) is forest. The average gradient is 6.1% (7.5% excluding the first 1,500 m; 4,900 ft of false flat), with one section at 11%.

As the Charmant Som route is closed in winter, the entire ascent can be made by ski mountaineering from the Col de Porte to the chalets, then up to the summit via the snow-covered mountain pastures. This route was used as a back-up during the Traversée de Chartreuse cross-country ski race in 2011. Despite the closure of the chairlift, the old red trail is still suitable for ski mountaineering between its downstream end and its junction with the road under Canaple. The Cottaves itinerary is possible on both the ascent and descent, as is the north-west corridor from the Col de la Charmette or the Collet from La Malamille. The Balme de l'Air can be traversed from Mont Fromage, between La Pinéa and the Oratoire d'Orgeval. The slabs of the eastern face can be used for the descent, but represent the most technical route (grading 4.3), with 40° to 45° slopes. Various loops are possible around the summit, via l'Oursière, Pré Bâtard, la combe de l'If, l'arête de Chamechine, le couloir nord-ouest, le Promontoire and le Collet.

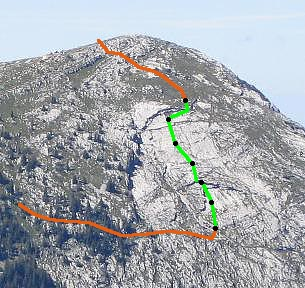
Route of the climbing route on the slabs of the east face of Charmant Som

The upper part of the limestone slabs on the east face offers an introduction to climbing on a route graded 3c. It can be accessed from the path between the chalets and Collet, and climbs 100 metres (330 ft) or so towards the summit, ending in a hike. It is possible to start from the lower part of the slabs, below the path, by taking the approach walk from the hamlet of Les Revols. The climb is slightly more difficult than the upper section (grading 4b), with a 130-metre (430 ft) vertical drop on a route that is also more varied. The Dièdre oublié route, opened in 1996, is located on the western slope and features passages rated 6b for a total height of 80 metres (260 ft).

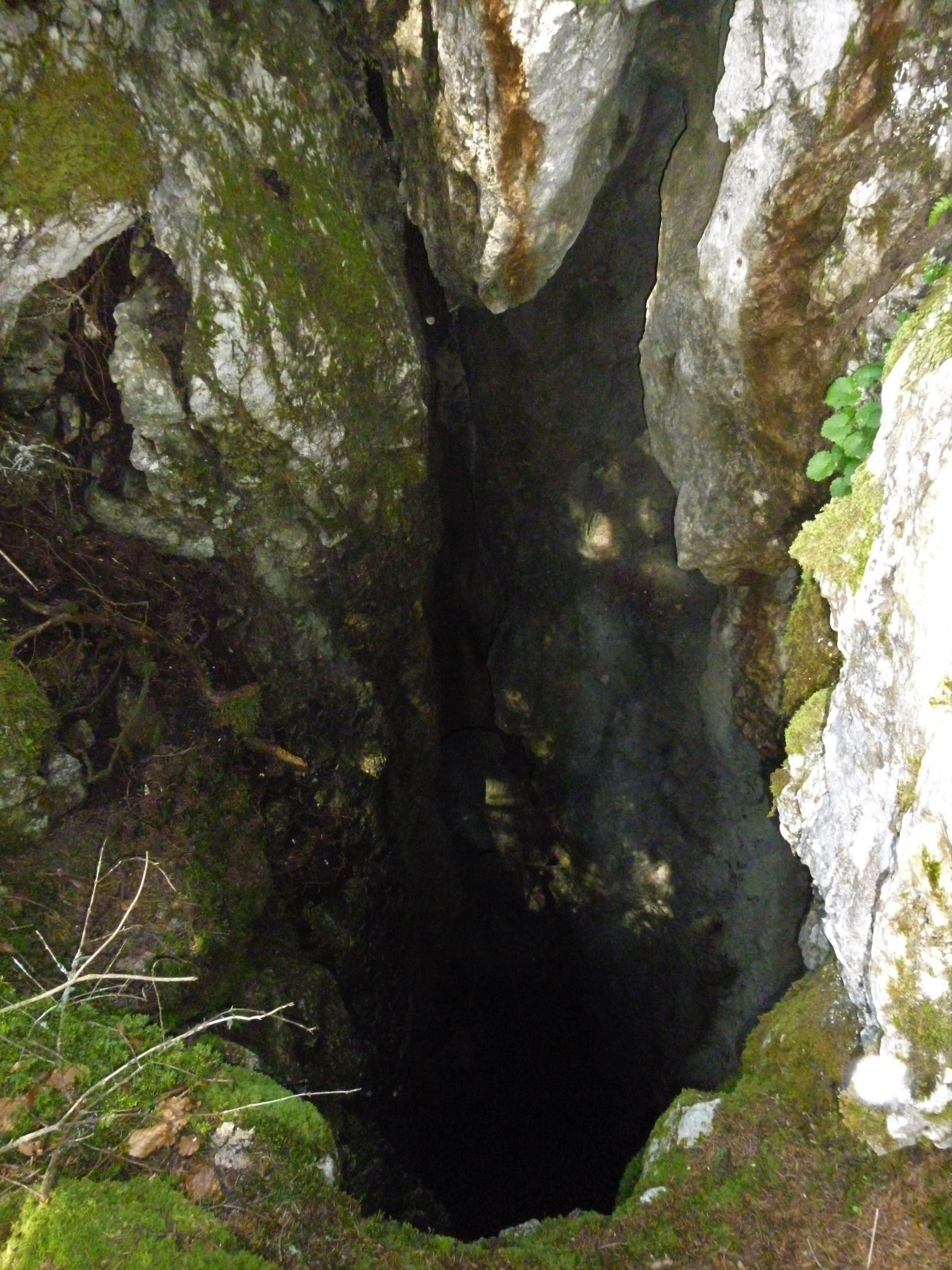
View of the entrance to Kriska chasm

The Kriska shaft is accessible to cavers from the Collet, at an altitude of 1,558 metres (5,112 ft), around 300 metres (980 ft) north-east of the summit. The Ded network then plunges into the Urgonian limestone through a series of shafts and narrow galleries. In 1991, dyes revealed its resurgence at Porte de l'Enclos in the Gorges du Guiers Mort, at an altitude of 780 metres (2,560 ft), at the end of the Bérard ridge. The section explored ends 40 metres (130 ft) higher up, with a siphon 3 kilometres (1.9 mi) from the source. This is the deepest cave in the Chartreuse.

The summit of Charmant Som is a paragliding take-off site. The take-off area is located in the limestone slabs on the eastern face, and enjoys good aerological conditions in the morning. Landing is at the hamlet of Les Revols or the village of Saint-Hugues, in the commune of Saint-Pierre-de-Chartreuse.

=== Environmental protection ===
Charmant Som is located within the Chartreuse Regional Nature Park, which was created in 1995 and, since the revision of its charter in 2008, covers 767 km^{2} (296 mi^{2}). The summit is also classified as a type I Natural area of ecological, faunal and floristic interest, covering 1,140.8 hectares (2,819 acres) from the mountain's two northern crests to La Pinéa, including the mountain pastures. Finally, the northern slope of the mountain, as far as the Gorges du Guiers Mort to the north and the Col de la Grande Vache to the west, is part of a Natura 2000 zone designed to preserve biodiversity over 2,329 hectares (5,760 acres) under the name "Ubacs du Charmant Som et Gorges du Guiers Mort". It has been recognized as a Site of Community Importance (SCI) since 2013.

== See also ==
- Auvergne-Rhône-Alpes
- Chamechaude
- Chartreuse Mountains
- Isère
- Limestone
