= Grand Som =

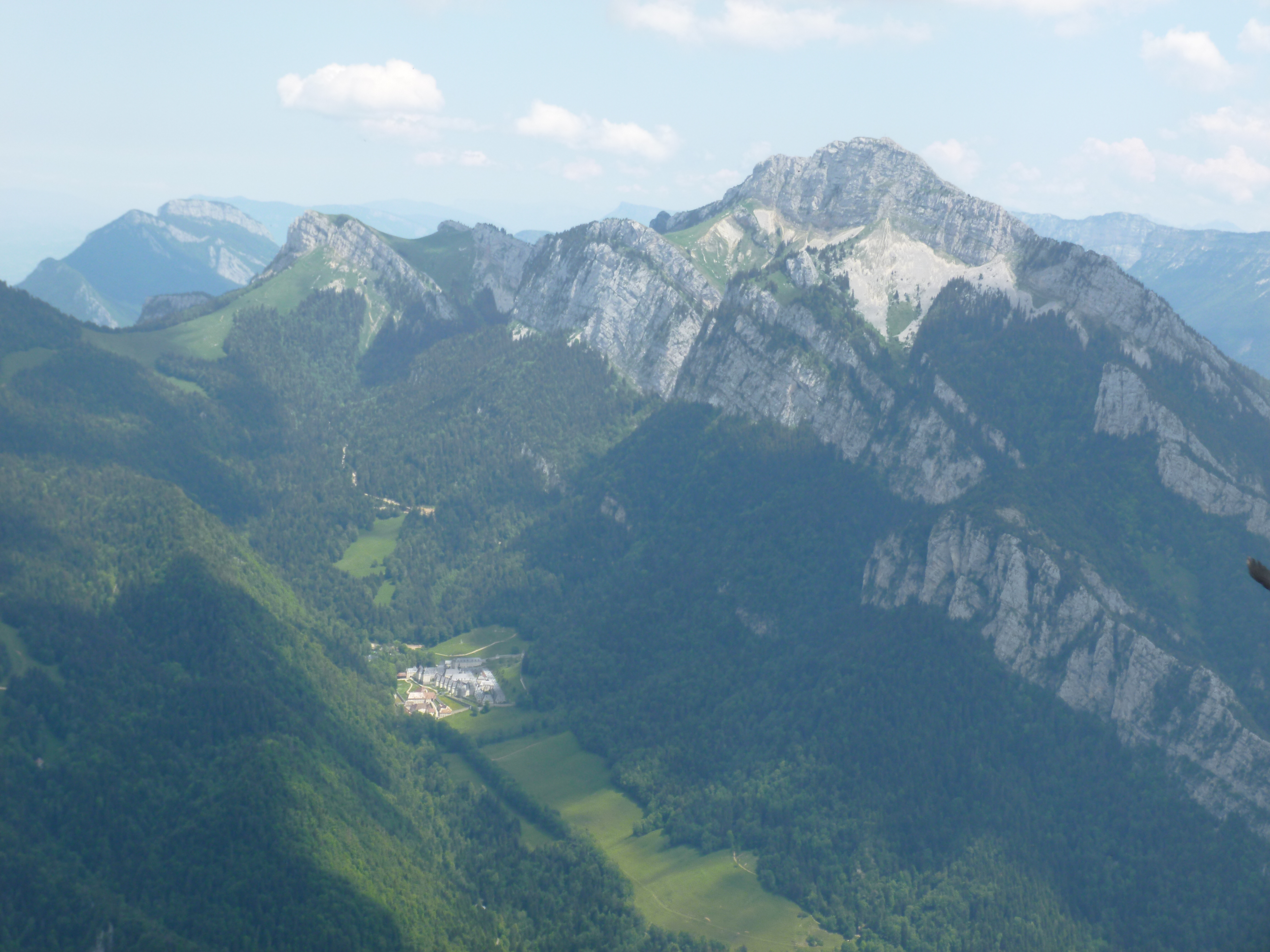
- The Grand Som from the Charmant Som.

Highest point
- Elevation: 2,026 m (6,647 ft)
- Prominence: 887 m (2,910 ft)
- Coordinates: 45°22′14″N 05°48′43″E

Geography
- Location within Alps
- Location: Isère, France
- Parent range: Chartreuse Mountains

The Grand Som is a mountain of the Chartreuse Mountains in the French Prealps, in Isère, France. It has a long ridge, unevenly sharp, overlooking the Petit Som (1,772m), the Col de la Ruchère northwest and the Grande Chartreuse monastery below the cliffs. The summit has a cross and two relief tables. It lies in the Parc Naturel Régional de la Chartreuse.

== Caving ==
Many chasms are present on the massif: Trou Lisse à Combonne (−303 m), puits de l'Écho (−396 m), gouffre Roland (−481 m), gouffre de Mauvernay (−507 m), gouffre des Aures (−512 m), but the most important network is the puits Francis (1,565 m) or Réseau de Bovinant of 723 meters deep for 6,836 m of development. Discovered in July 1966 by the caving club of La Tronche (FLT), the siphon at (−688 m) was reached on August 23, 1967. Upper entries were then found.

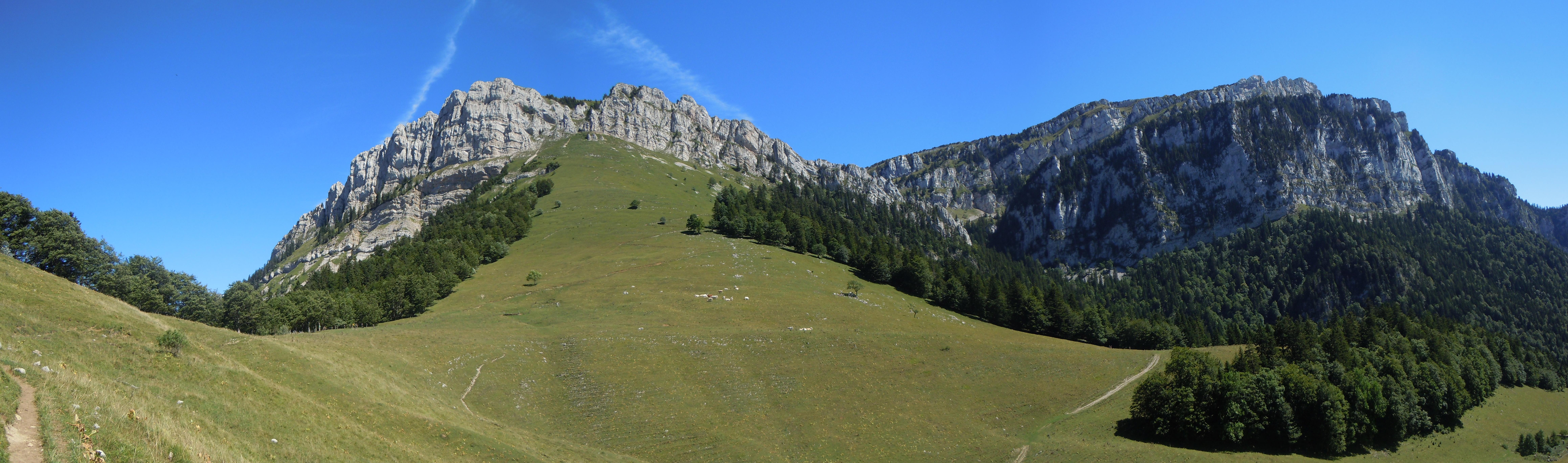
View from the col de la Ruchère to the Petit Som (1,772 metres (5,814 ft), on the left) and the summit of the Grand Som (on the right).
