= Athyrium montanum =

Athyrium montanum is the name of a fern species, which may refer to:

- Athyrium montanum (Lam.) Röhl. ex Spreng., combined in 1804, now known as Cystopteris montana
- Athyrium montanum (Willd.) Shafer, published 1901, an illegitimate later homonym, now known as Asplenium montanum
