= Chamechaude =

Mountain in France

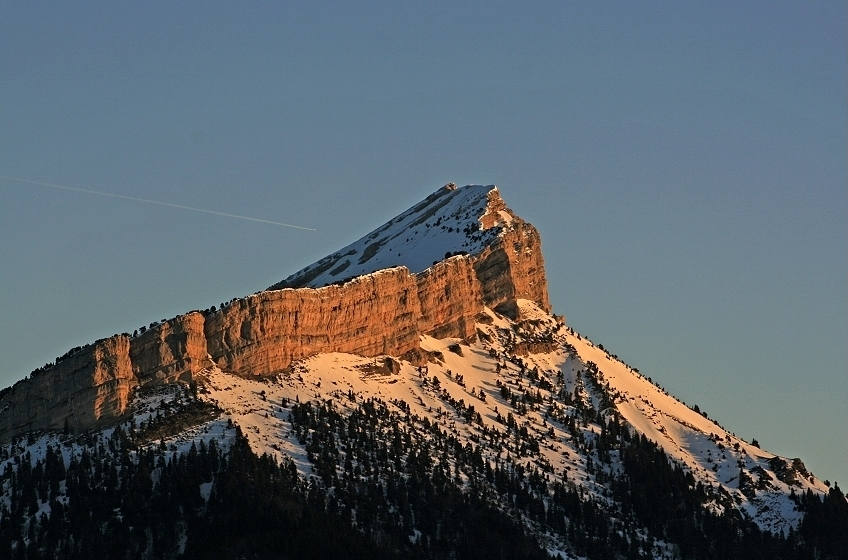
- Chamechaude from the summit of Mont Saint-Eynard

Highest point
- Elevation: 2,082 m (6,831 ft)
- Prominence: 1,769 m (5,804 ft)
- Isolation: 16.98 km (10.55 mi)
- Listing: Ultra
- Coordinates: 45°17′17″N 05°47′24″E

Geography
- Location within Alps
- Location: Isère, France
- Parent range: Chartreuse Mountains

Climbing
- Easiest route: From the Col de Porte

Chamechaude (French pronunciation: [ʃamʃod]) is the highest summit in the Chartreuse Massif in the Isère department in eastern France. It is the fourth most prominent mountain in metropolitan France.

== Ascent ==
The ascent is a hike, but there are also several climbing routes on the east face.

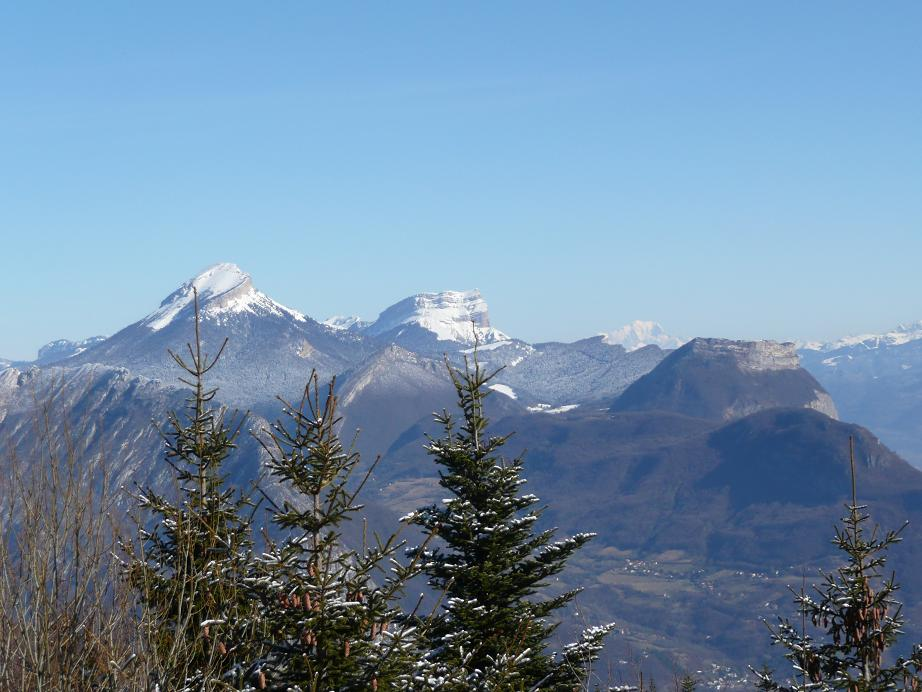
Chamechaude (left)

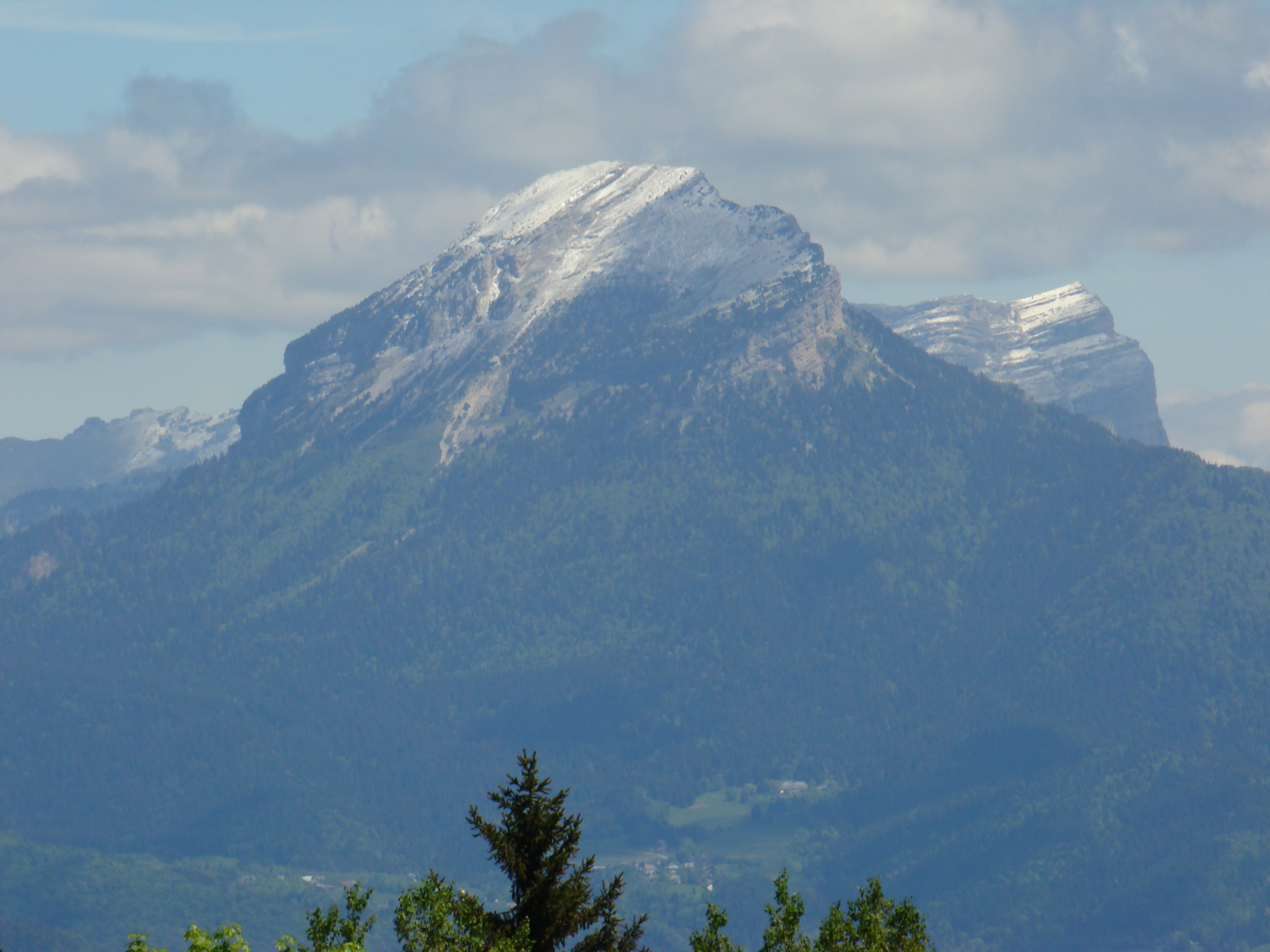
Seen from Plateau Sornin

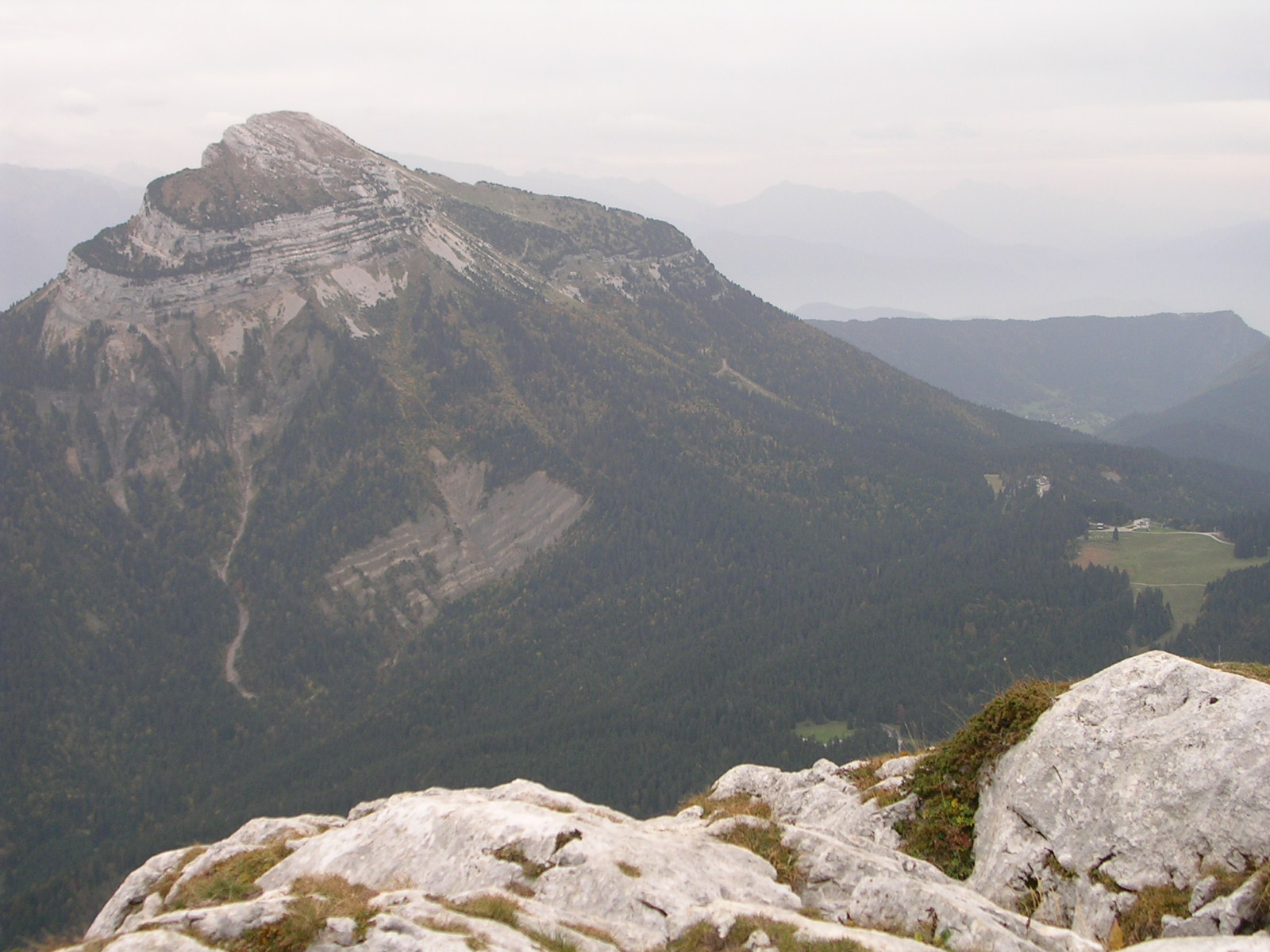
Seen from the summit Charmant Som

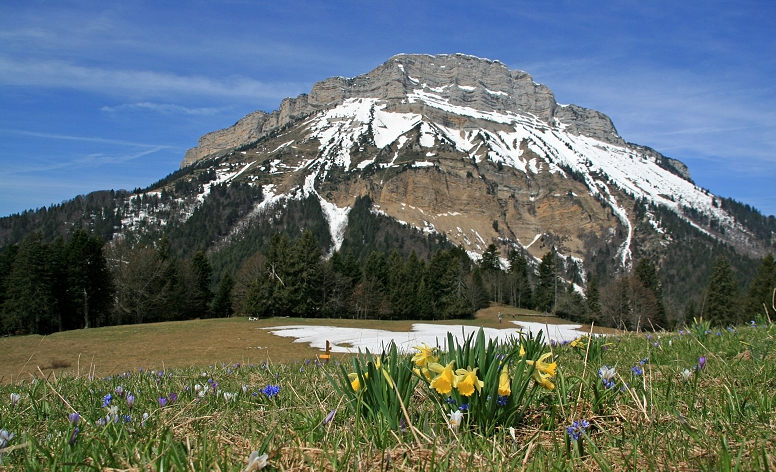
Seen from Émeindras

== See also ==
- Charmant Som
- List of Alpine peaks by prominence
