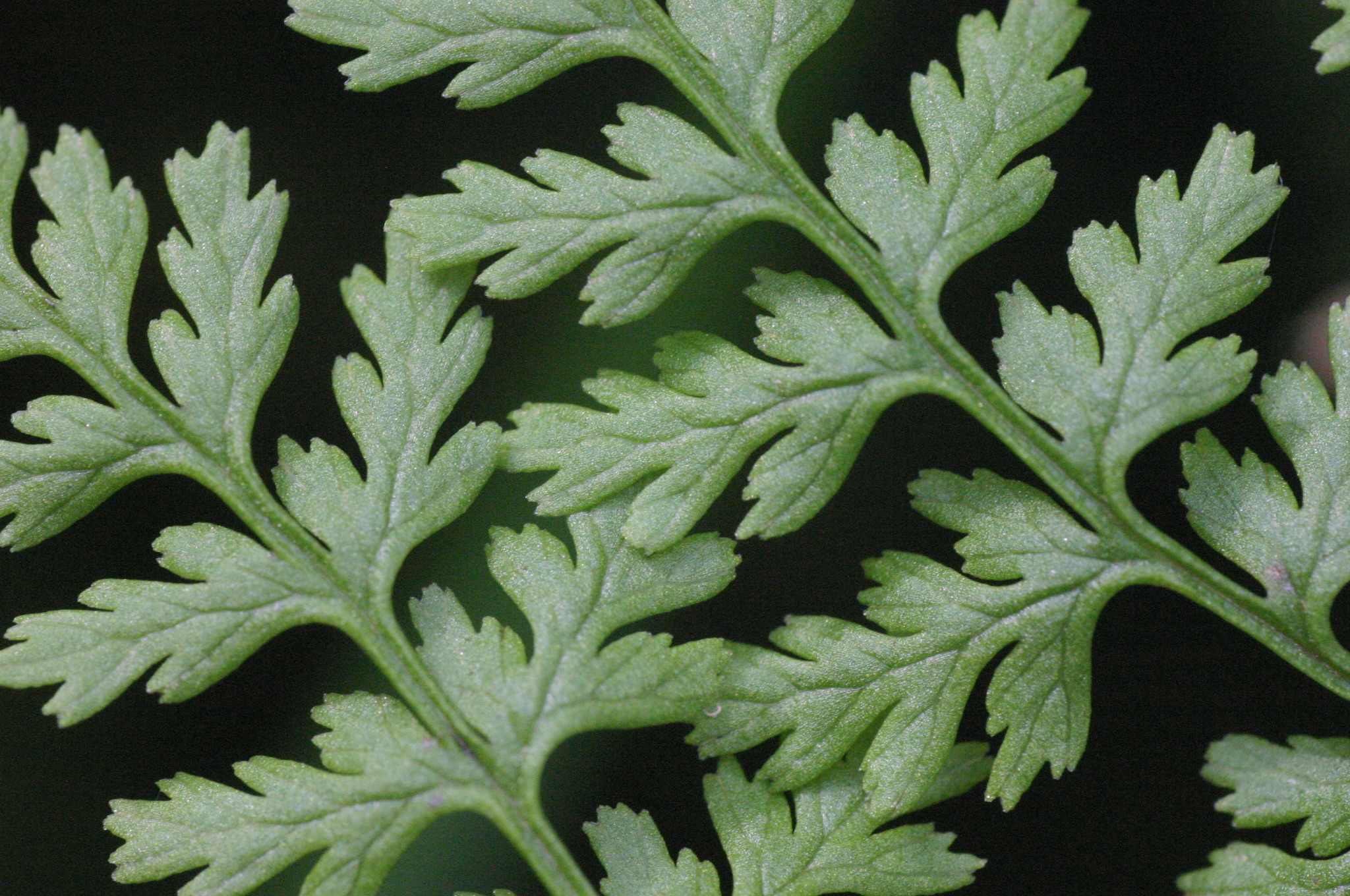

Conservation status
- Secure (NatureServe)

Scientific classification
- Kingdom: Plantae
- Clade: Tracheophytes
- Division: Polypodiophyta
- Class: Polypodiopsida
- Order: Polypodiales
- Suborder: Aspleniineae
- Family: Cystopteridaceae
- Genus: Cystopteris
- Species: C. montana

Binomial name
- Cystopteris montana (Lam.) Bernh. ex Desv.

= Cystopteris montana =

Species of fern

Cystopteris montana, previously classified as Athyrium montanum, is a species of fern known by the common name mountain bladderfern. It occurs throughout the high latitudes of the Northern Hemisphere, in Eurasia, Greenland, and Alaska, and around Canada. It is also present in the higher elevations in Colorado further south.

This fern produces a creeping, cordlike, scaly stem. The leaves are up to 45 centimeters long. The blades are borne on a petiole with a dark base and a light-colored end. The petiole is longer than the blade. The blade is pentagonal in shape and divided into leaflets which are subdivided into many lobed and toothed segments. The sori are covered in hairy, whitish, cup-shaped indusia.

This fern grows in moist mountain habitat, such as forests near streams.
