= Galium obliquum =

Scientific classification
- Kingdom: Plantae
- Clade: Tracheophytes
- Clade: Angiosperms
- Clade: Eudicots
- Clade: Asterids
- Order: Gentianales
- Family: Rubiaceae
- Genus: Galium
- Species: G. obliquum

Binomial name
- Galium obliquum Vill.

Synonyms
- Galium rubrum subsp. obliquum (Vill.) Rouy in G.Rouy & J.Foucaud; Galium mucronatum Lam.; Galium pallens Thuill.; Galium corsicum Tausch; Galium alpicola Jord.; Galium brachypodum Jord.; Galium gracilentum Jord.; Galium laetum Jord.; Galium lusitanicum Jord.; Galium luteolum Jord.; Galium myrianthum Jord.; Galium prostii Jord.; Galium rubidum Jord.; Galium leucophaeum Gren. & Godr.; Galium pseudomyrianthum Gennari; Galium tomophyllum Gand.; Galium jordanii subsp. gracilentum (Jord.) Nyman

Species of plant

Galium obliquum is a species of plants in the Rubiaceae. It is native to the Alps along the border between France and Italy, and as far south as Tuscany and as far west as Tarn-et-Garonne.

Galium obliquum is an erect herb with thin stems, narrow leaves (as many as 10 per node) and white or pale yellow flowers.
