= Col de la Ruchère =

Mountain pass in France

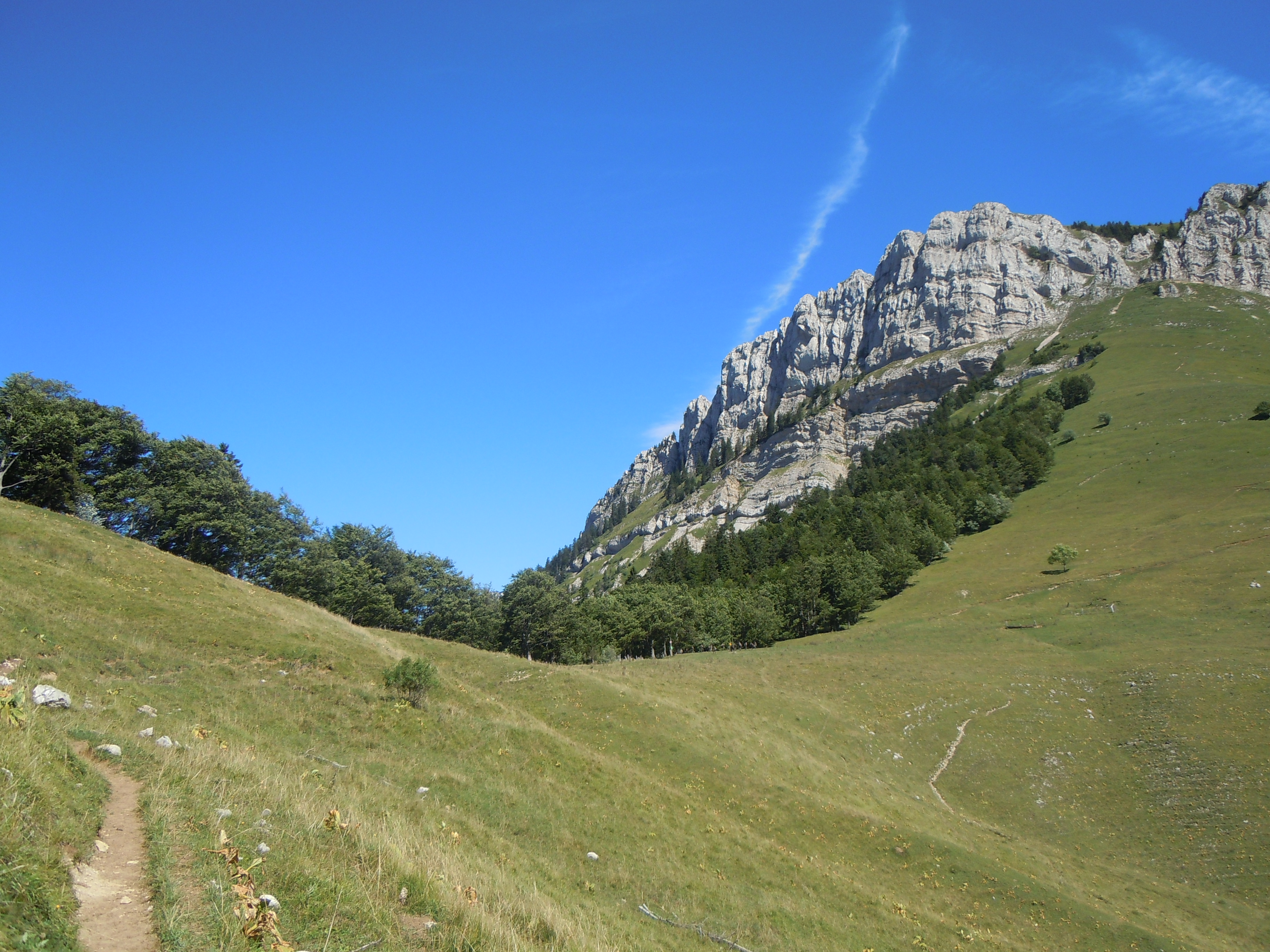
- View on the col de la Ruchère from the Pré de la Folie path.

- Location within France
- Elevation: 1,407 metres (4,616 ft)

Third Approach
- Location: Isère, France
- Range: Alps
- Coordinates: 45°23′11″N 5°47′53″E

The Col de la Ruchère is a mountain pass located at 1,407 m above sea level, in the township of Saint-Christophe-sur-Guiers in the Chartreuse Mountains between the Riondettes meadow at La Ruchère and the Grande Chartreuse monastery.

This pass is only accessible by foot: from the south, fully wooded, 2 hours 30 minutes walk from Correrie at the entrance of the silence zone of the monastery; from the north, overlooking a pasture, 1 hour 30 minutes walk from the hamlet of La Ruchère or from its northern winter sports resort area.
