= Gorges du Guiers Mort =

Coordinates: 45.3519°N 5.7595°E

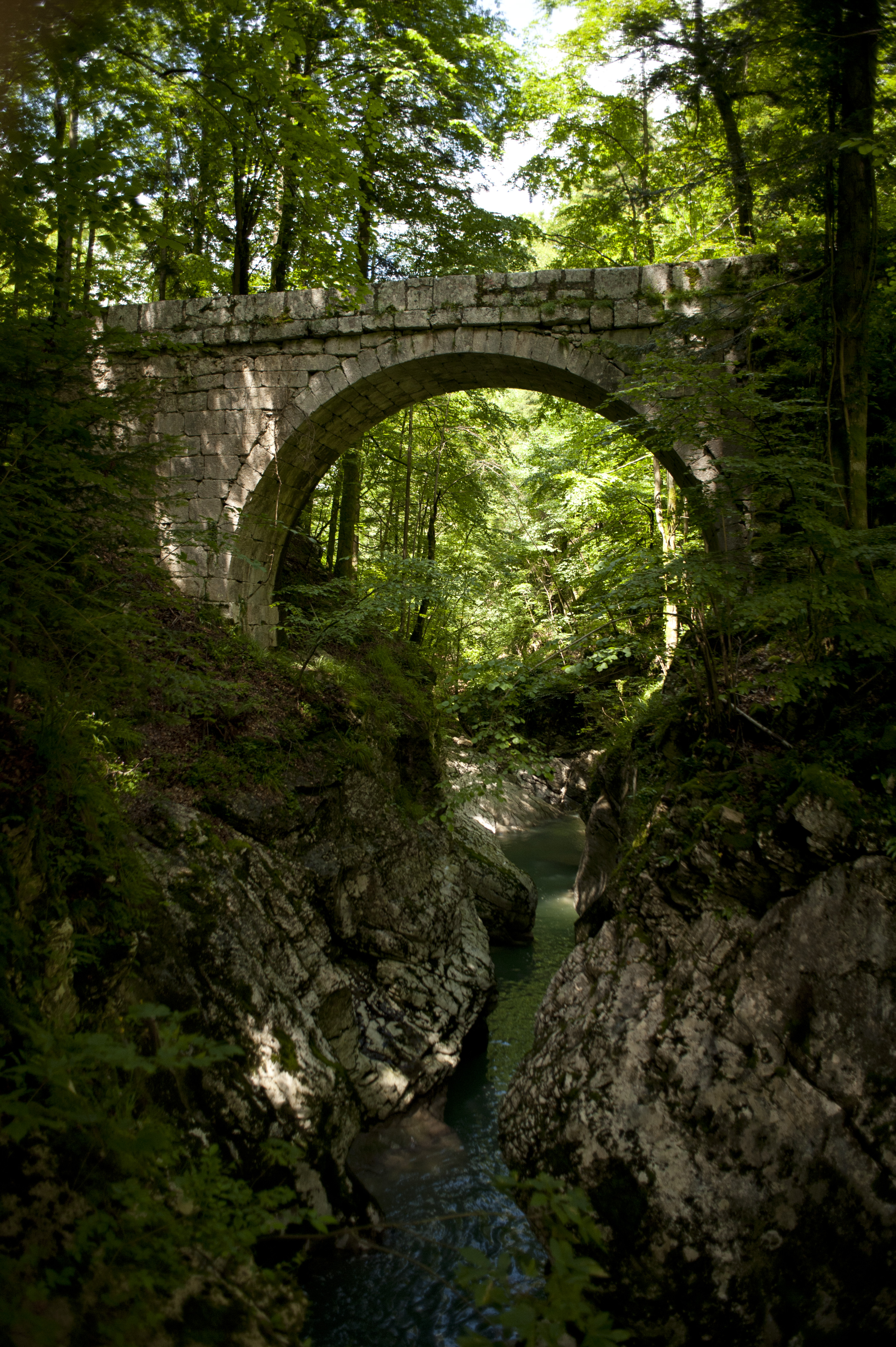
Pont Peirant at Saint-Laurent-du-Pont in the Gorges du Guiers Mort.

The Gorges du Guiers Mort is a canyon located in the French department of Isère, downstream of Saint-Pierre-de-Chartreuse. The river Guiers Mort flows through it.

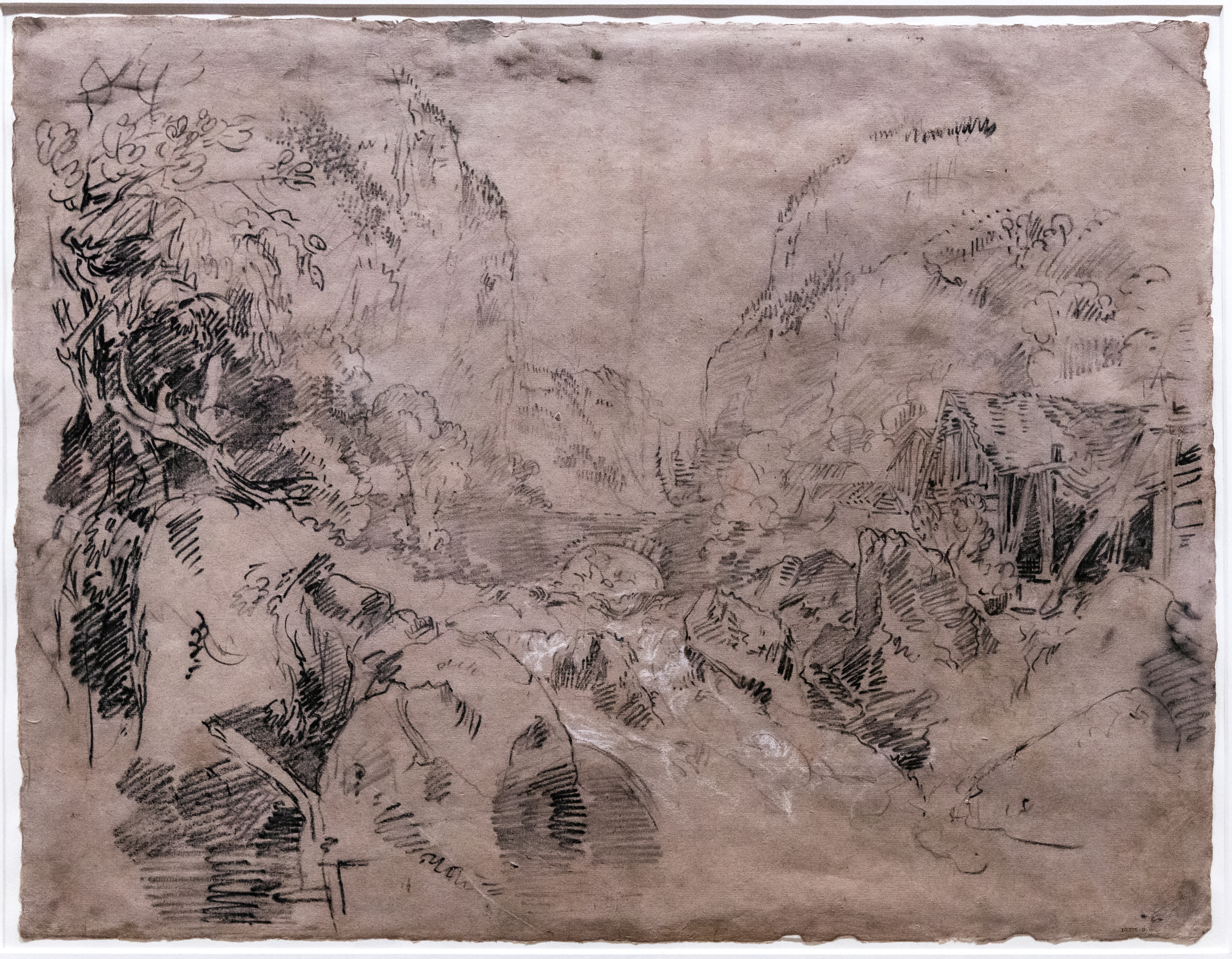
A Bridge over a mountain Stream - Gorges du Guiers Mort, Chartreuse - 1802- William Turner - Tate Britain
