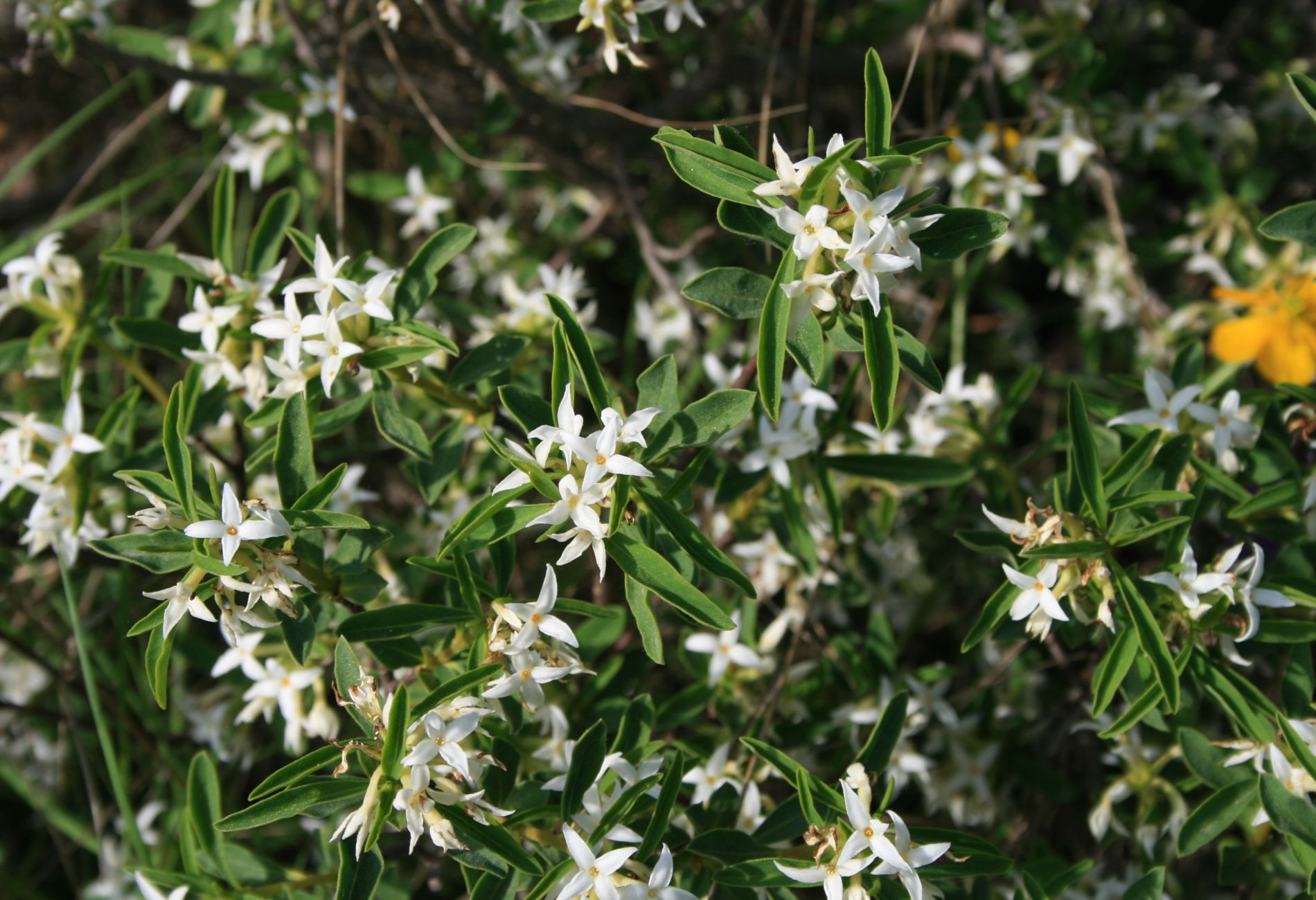

Scientific classification
- Kingdom: Plantae
- Clade: Tracheophytes
- Clade: Angiosperms
- Clade: Eudicots
- Clade: Rosids
- Order: Malvales
- Family: Thymelaeaceae
- Genus: Daphne
- Species: D. alpina

Binomial name
- Daphne alpina L.

= Daphne alpina =

Species of shrub

Daphne alpina is a shrub, of the family Thymelaeaceae. It is deciduous, and is found in southern and central Europe.

== Description ==
The shrub has an erect habit, and grows to a height of 40 to 60 cm. It grows leaves that are 1 to 4 cm long and small white flowers that are 8 to 10 mm. It is found in limestone rocks at an altitude from 300 to 1500 m.
