= Le Môle =

Mountain in France

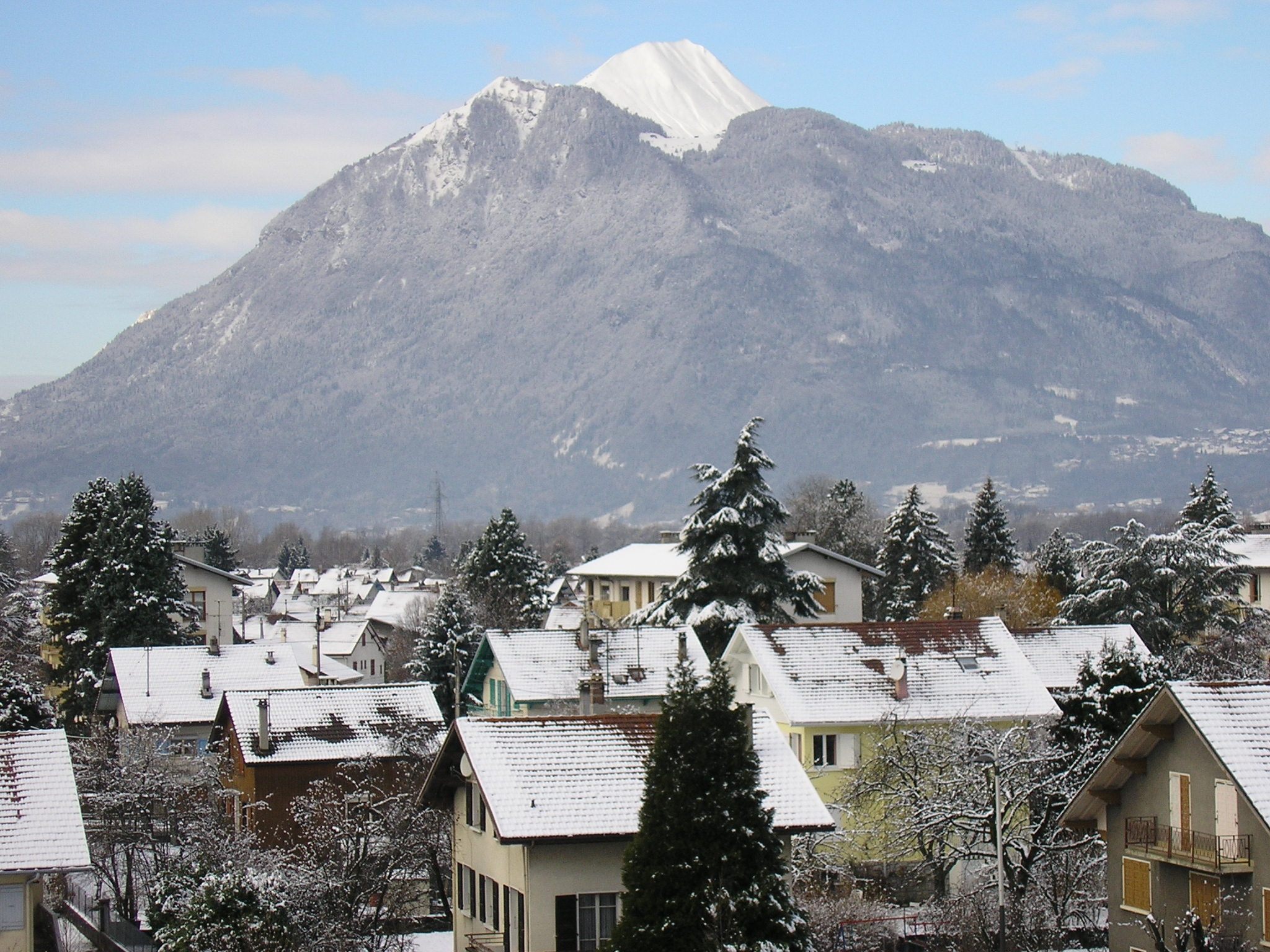

Highest point
- Elevation: 1,863 m (6,112 ft)
- Prominence: 1,254 m (4,114 ft)
- Coordinates: 46°06′24″N 06°27′18″E

Geography
- Location within Alps
- Main peaks of the Chablais Alps Mouse over (or touch) gives more detail of peaks. Location in the Alps
- Location: Haute-Savoie, France
- Parent range: Chablais Alps

Le Môle (French pronunciation: [lə mol]) is a mountain of the Chablais Alps in the Haute-Savoie department of France which dominates the area around the town of Bonneville. The communes of Ayze, La Tour, Saint-Jean-de-Tholome, Marignier, Saint-Jeoire-en-Faucigny, Viuz-en-Sallaz, Peillonnex, and Faucigny encircle it. It rises to 1,863 metres and affords an excellent 360-degree view of the surrounding region.

Though a small mountain by Alpine standards, it is of great geographic importance as it divides the vallée de l'Arve to the south and the west from the vallée du Giffre to the north and southeast, and dominates the southern entrance to the Geneva basin. Mary Shelley, in her 1818 novel Frankenstein; or, The Modern Prometheus, quotes Le Môle as being seen by Victor Frankenstein from Geneva, where he was born and lived before being a student in Germany.

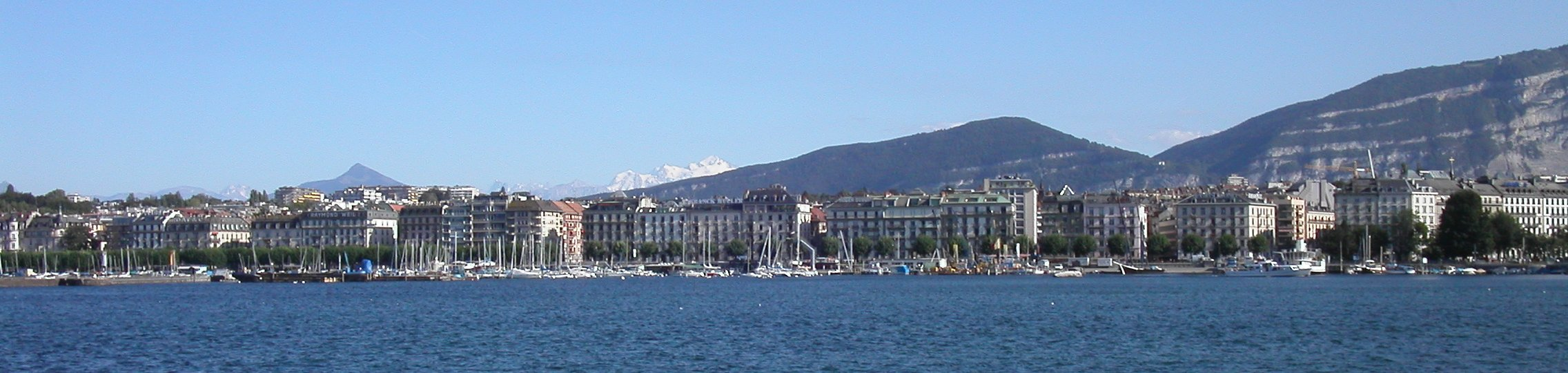
Le Môle (to the left of Mont Blanc, in the background) as seen from Geneva, to the right and in the foreground is the Salève.

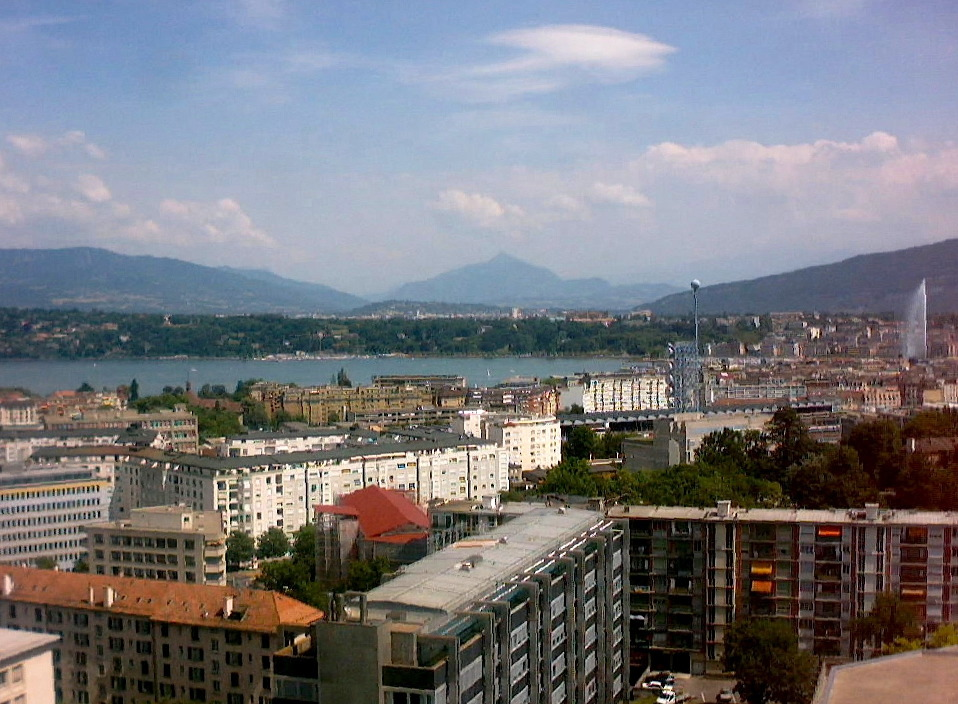
Le Môle, center, seen from Geneva on a hazy June day.
