= Route nationale 205 =

Road in France

National road 205
- Route nationale 205
- Route Blanche

Route information
- Part of E25 (section between Passy and the Mont Blanc Tunnel)
- Maintained by ATMB
- Length: 88 km (55 mi)
- Existed: 1973–present

Major junctions
- Northwest end: at Gaillard
- 1 Annemasse D 1206 2 Contamine-sur-Arve D 903; 3 Bonneville D 1203; 4 Cluses D 902; 5 Sallanches D 1212; 6 Passy E25 / A 40 / D 902 7 Chamonix D 1506

- Southeast end: A 40 T 1 / A 5 at Mont Blanc Tunnel

Location
- Country: France

Highway system
- Roads in France; Autoroutes; Routes nationales

The Route nationale 205 is a Route nationale of France that is located entirely within the Department of Haute-Savoie. It starts off from the France–Switzerland border in the commune of Gaillard which is adjacent to Geneva; and ends at Chamonix, at the French side of the Mont Blanc Tunnel. It is also nicknamed the Route blanche (white route) due to its snowiness, and shares the title with the A40 autoroute, also nicknamed the Autoroute blanche.

== Route ==
The rows shown in yellow are the endpoints of the RN205.

Communes that the RN205 passes through
| Distance | Commune | Canton |
|---|---|---|
| 0 km | Gaillard (France-Switzerland border) | Gaillard |
| 2 km | Ambilly | Annemasse |
| 3 km | Annemasse | Annemasse |
| 11 km | Nangy | La Roche-sur-Foron |
| 15 km | Contamine-sur-Arve | Bonneville |
| 23 km | Bonneville | Bonneville |
| 30 km | Vougy | Bonneville |
| 37 km | Cluses | Cluses |
| 53 km | Sallanches | Sallanches |
| 56 km | Domancy | Sallanches |
| 61 km | Passy | Le Mont-Blanc |
| 67 km | Servoz | Le Mont-Blanc |
| 72 km | Les Houches | Le Mont-Blanc |
| 88 km | Chamonix-Mont-Blanc (Mont Blanc Tunnel) | Le Mont-Blanc |

== History ==
This road was created following the reform of 1972, taking over several sections of old national roads:

- the RN 505 from Gaillard to Contamine-sur-Arve (Findrol);
- a section of the RN 203 from Contamine-sur-Arve to Bonneville;
- a section of the RN 506 from Bonneville to Cluses;
- a section of the RN 202 from Cluses to Passy;
- a section of the RN 506 from Passy to Chamonix-Mont-Blanc;
- the RN 506a from Chamonix-Mont-Blanc to the Mont-Blanc tunnel.

It was split by the A40 motorway, which opened from Gaillard to Passy between 1973 and 1976.

The decree of December 5, 2005 provided for the conservation of the Passy section, at the end of the A 40 motorway, up to the Mont-Blanc tunnel; the section not concerned is downgraded to departmental road 1205 and its management is entrusted to the General Council of Haute-Savoie.

The national road network is made up of the following routes, shown on the attached maps ("Entire France" and "Ile-de-France"):
.
.
.
34. The Saône valley (Mâcon, A 6) -Italy (Mont Blanc tunnel) link provided, on the one hand, north of Mâcon, by the section of the A 40 motorway (between the A 6 motorway and Saint-André-de-Bagé) and, on the other hand, south of Mâcon, by the national road 79 (between the A 6 motorway and the A 406 motorway) and the A 406 motorway (between the national road 79 and the A 40-Saint-André-de-Bagé motorway), then the A 40 motorway and the 205 national road (between the A 40 motorway at Le Fayet and the Mont Blanc tunnel), including the motorway A 404 (Oyonnax slip road) and the link project between the A 40 motorway and Thonon.

— Decree n° 2005-1499 of 5 December 2005 relating to the consistency of the national road network,

However, since May 1, 2010, the RN 205 has been granted to the company ATMB, which already operates the A40 autoroute and the Mont Blanc tunnel.

RN 205 is planned to be the first public electric road in France. Alstom will trial its electric road system in the Rhône-Alpes region between 2024 and 2027.

== Before the Reform ==
Before the 1972 reform, there was an RN 205 in the Alpes-Maritimes.

It was initially to connect Nice to Barcelonnette via the top of the Bonette. Border conflicts will mean that the road will not reach the bordering department of Basses-Alpes and another road had to be built by the Col de la Cayolle to reach Barcelonnette. The route from Nice to the Pont de la Mescla was integrated into the RN202 in 1920. The RN 205 stopped at Pont-Haut in the town of Saint-Dalmas-le-Selvage and the Alpes-Maritimes General Council completed the route leading to the Col de la Bonette.

The RN 205 is downgraded to RD 2205 following the reform of 1972. Since 2012, this road has been named M 2205, the municipalities crossed being members of the Nice Côte d'Azur metropolis.

The route went through:

- Mescla bridge, municipality of Malaussène (RN 202 then D 6202 then M 6202)
- Saint-Sauveur-sur-Tinée
- Isola
- Saint-Etienne-de-Tinée
- Pont-Haut, municipality of Saint-Dalmas-le-Selvage
