= Arrondissement of Bonneville =

Coordinates: 46°04′25″N 6°24′30″E

Bonneville
- Arrondissement
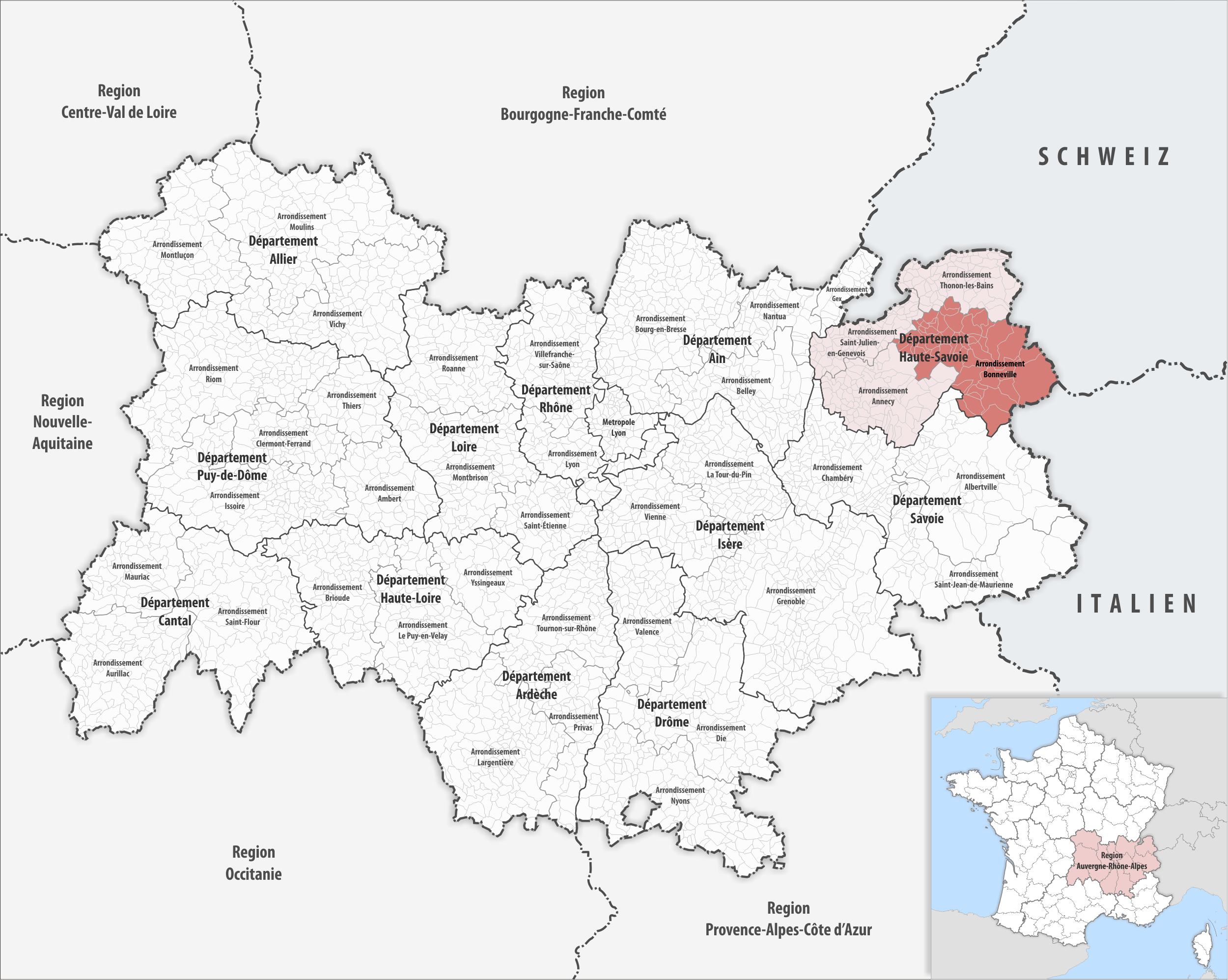
- Location within the region Auvergne-Rhône-Alpes
- Country: France
- Region: Auvergne-Rhône-Alpes
- Department: Haute-Savoie
- No. of communes: {{{nbcomm}}}
- Area: 1,527.6 km^{2} (589.8 sq mi)
- Population (2023): 197,580
  - Density: 129.34/km^{2} (334.99/sq mi)
- INSEE code: 742

The arrondissement of Bonneville is an arrondissement of France in the Haute-Savoie department in the Auvergne-Rhône-Alpes region. It has 59 communes. Its population is 194,428 (2021), and its area is 1,527.6 km^{2} (589.8 sq mi).

== Composition ==
The communes of the arrondissement of Bonneville, and their INSEE codes, are:

1. Amancy (74007)
2. Arâches-la-Frasse (74014)
3. Arenthon (74018)
4. Ayse (74024)
5. Bonneville (74042)
6. Brizon (74049)
7. Chamonix-Mont-Blanc (74056)
8. La Chapelle-Rambaud (74059)
9. Châtillon-sur-Cluses (74064)
10. Cluses (74081)
11. Combloux (74083)
12. Les Contamines-Montjoie (74085)
13. Contamine-sur-Arve (74087)
14. Cordon (74089)
15. Cornier (74090)
16. Demi-Quartier (74099)
17. Domancy (74103)
18. Eteaux (74116)
19. Faucigny (74122)
20. Fillinges (74128)
21. Glières-Val-de-Borne (74212)
22. Les Houches (74143)
23. Magland (74159)
24. Marcellaz (74162)
25. Marignier (74164)
26. Marnaz (74169)
27. Megève (74173)
28. Mégevette (74174)
29. Mieussy (74183)
30. Mont-Saxonnex (74189)
31. Morillon (74190)
32. Nancy-sur-Cluses (74196)
33. Onnion (74205)
34. Passy (74208)
35. Peillonnex (74209)
36. Praz-sur-Arly (74215)
37. Le Reposoir (74221)
38. La Rivière-Enverse (74223)
39. La Roche-sur-Foron (74224)
40. Saint-Gervais-les-Bains (74236)
41. Saint-Jean-de-Tholome (74240)
42. Saint-Jeoire (74241)
43. Saint-Laurent (74244)
44. Saint-Pierre-en-Faucigny (74250)
45. Saint-Sigismond (74252)
46. Saint-Sixt (74253)
47. Sallanches (74256)
48. Samoëns (74258)
49. Scionzier (74264)
50. Servoz (74266)
51. Sixt-Fer-à-Cheval (74273)
52. Taninges (74276)
53. Thyez (74278)
54. La Tour (74284)
55. Vallorcine (74290)
56. Verchaix (74294)
57. Ville-en-Sallaz (74304)
58. Viuz-en-Sallaz (74311)
59. Vougy (74312)

== History ==
The arrondissement of Bonneville was created in 1860. In June 2023 it lost two communes to the arrondissement of Thonon-les-Bains, and it gained one from the arrondissement of Saint-Julien-en-Genevois.

As a result of the reorganisation of the cantons of France which came into effect in 2015, the borders of the cantons are no longer related to the borders of the arrondissements. The cantons of the arrondissement of Bonneville were, as of January 2015:

1. Bonneville
2. Chamonix-Mont-Blanc
3. Cluses
4. La Roche-sur-Foron
5. Saint-Gervais-les-Bains
6. Saint-Jeoire
7. Sallanches
8. Samoëns
9. Scionzier
10. Taninges
