= Viuz-en-Sallaz =

Viuz-en-Sallaz Viu (Savoyard)
- Commune
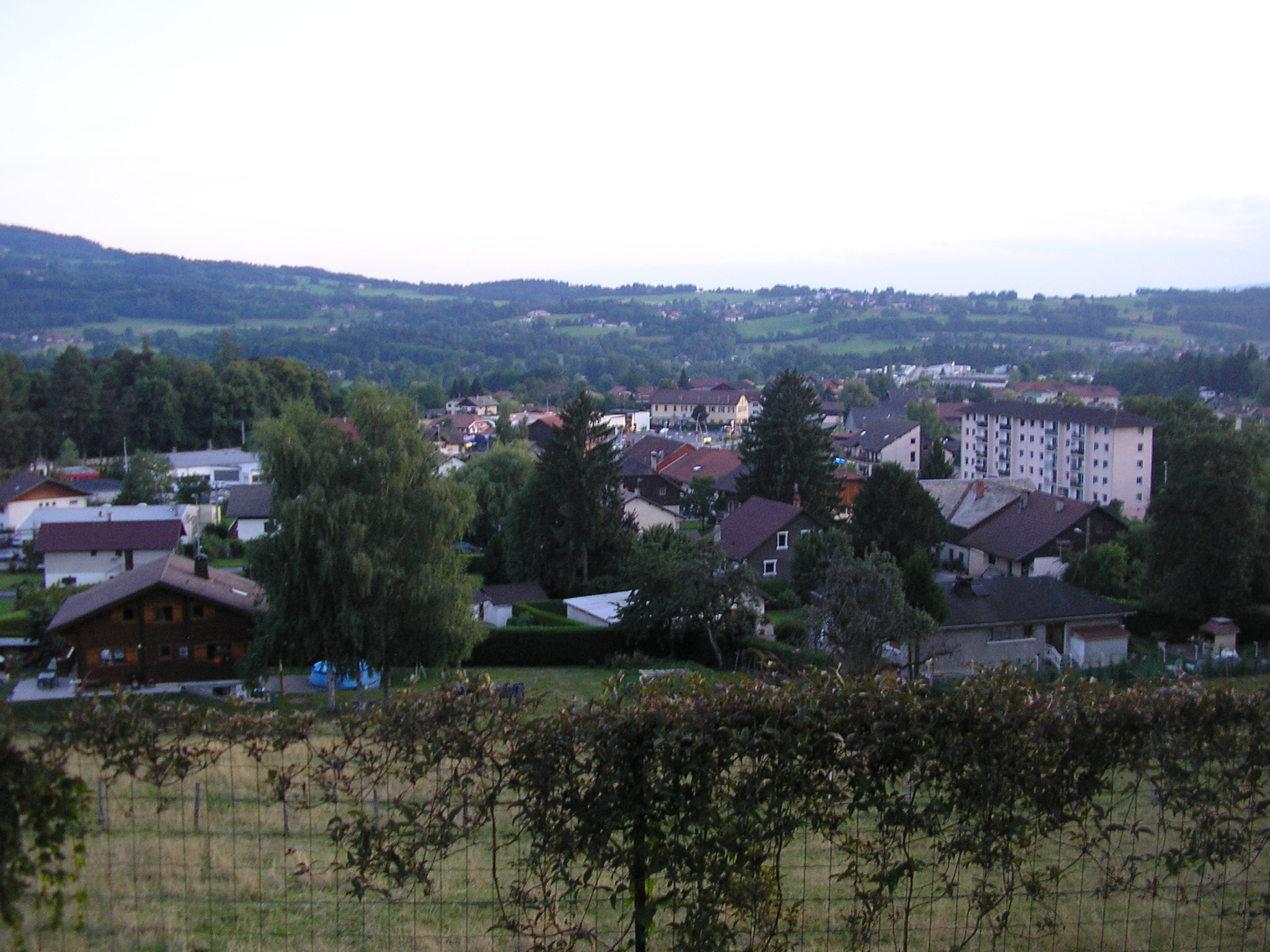
- A general view of Viuz-en-Sallaz

- Coat of arms
- Location of Viuz-en-Sallaz
- Location within France Location within Auvergne-Rhône-Alpes
- Coordinates: 46°08′54″N 6°24′40″E
- Country: France
- Region: Auvergne-Rhône-Alpes
- Department: Haute-Savoie
- Arrondissement: Bonneville
- Canton: Bonneville
- Intercommunality: Quatre Rivières

Government
  - Mayor (2020–2026): Pascal Pochat-Baron
- Area^{1}: 20.99 km^{2} (8.10 sq mi)
- Elevation: 680 m (2,230 ft)
- Highest elevation: 1,500 m (4,900 ft)
- Lowest elevation: 550 m (1,800 ft)
- Population (2023): 4,681
  - Density: 223.0/km^{2} (577.6/sq mi)
- Demonym(s): Viuzienne, Viuzien
- Time zone: UTC+01:00 (CET)
  - Summer (DST): UTC+02:00 (CEST)
- INSEE/Postal code: 74311 /74250
- ^{1} French Land Register data, which excludes lakes, ponds, glaciers > 1 km^{2} (0.386 sq mi or 247 acres) and river estuaries.

Viuz-en-Sallaz (French pronunciation: [vjy ɑ̃ sala]; Savoyard: Viu) is a commune in the Haute-Savoie department and Auvergne-Rhône-Alpes region of eastern France, close to the Swiss border.

It was historically a possession of the noble house of de Faucigny and then passed to Ardutius de Faucigny, Bishop of Geneva and successive prince-bishops. It stayed in the possession of the church until the French Revolution. There is a statue of St Francis de Sales, then Bishop of Geneva, in Viuz.

== Population ==
Historical population
| Year | Pop. | ±% p.a. |
|---|---|---|
| 1968 | 2,213 | — |
| 1975 | 2,267 | +0.34% |
| 1982 | 2,379 | +0.69% |
| 1990 | 2,944 | +2.70% |
| 1999 | 3,373 | +1.52% |
| 2007 | 3,753 | +1.34% |
| 2012 | 3,947 | +1.01% |
| 2017 | 4,374 | +2.08% |
| 2023 | 4,681 | +1.14% |
Source: INSEE

== Toponymy ==
The name of the locality is attested from the mid-13th century. Recorded forms include Viu en Salaz in 1250 and Cura de Vyu around 1344. An inscription on the gable of the 19th-century church gives the form Vicus in Sala.

The place name Viuz derives from Latin vicus, meaning a small settlement or village.

In Arpitan, the name of the commune is written Viu according to the Conflans orthography.

== History ==
Viuz-en-Sallaz belonged to the mandement of Thiez, which comprised the parishes of Bogève, Saint-André, Viuz and Ville-en-Sallaz. It was held by the lords of Faucigny until Arducius de Faucigny, bishop of Geneva, inherited it and left it to his successors, the bishops of Geneva.

The “land of Viuz” is mentioned on 11 April 1191 in an agreement between Bishop Nantelme and the knights Guillaume and Amédée Pofeis. The “land of Sallaz” is likewise mentioned on 29 March 1212, during a discussion between Aymon II of Faucigny and Bishop Bernard Chabert.

The mandement was occupied by Francis I of France in 1536 and passed to Savoy in 1539.

During the debates over the future of the Duchy of Savoy in 1860, part of the population favoured the union of northern Savoy with Switzerland. A petition circulated in Chablais, Faucigny and the northern Genevois, gathering more than 13,600 signatures, including 16 from Viuz-en-Sallaz.

== See also ==
- Communes of the Haute-Savoie department
