= Hirmentaz =

Mountain in the Chablais Alps, France

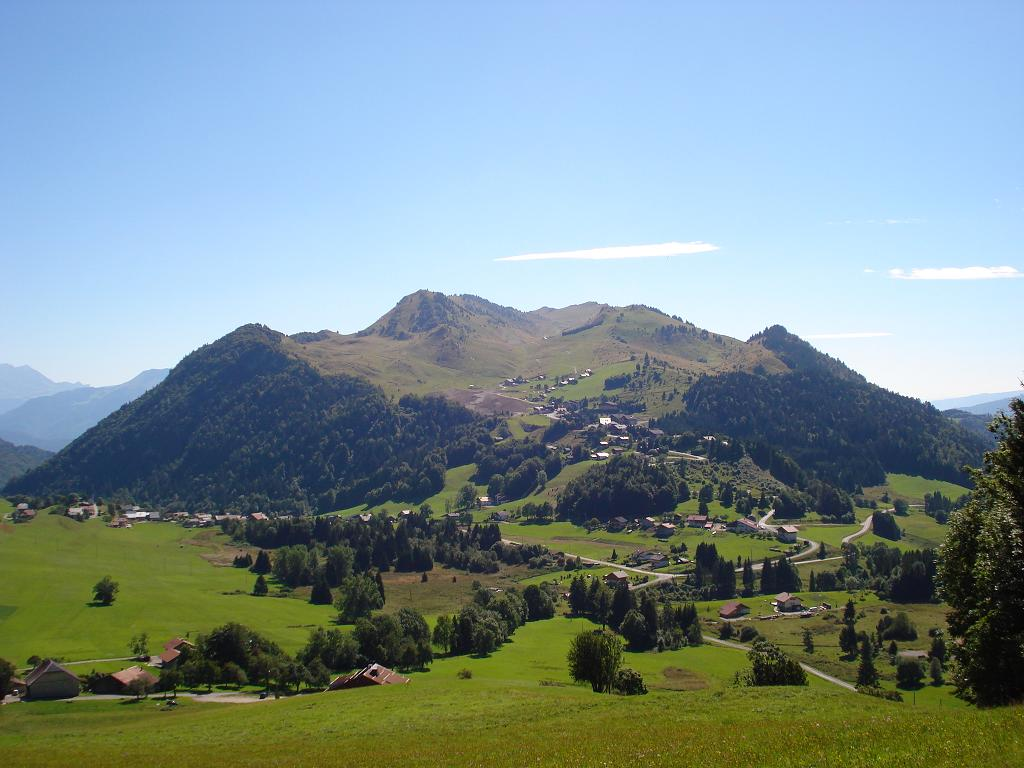

Highest point
- Elevation: 1,607 m (5,272 ft)
- Coordinates: 46°13′47″N 06°29′42″E

Geography
- Location within France
- Location: Haute-Savoie, France
- Parent range: Chablais Alps

Hirmentaz (French pronunciation: [iʁmɑ̃taz], ir-men-taz) is a mountain in eastern France, belonging to the Chablais Alps, and located in the communes of Bellevaux, Habère-Poche, Habère-Lullin and Mégevette. Two ski stations have been set up on its slopes, one, also called Hirmentaz, in the Bellevaux commune, and the other, called Domaine des Habères, in the communes of Habère-Poche and Habère-Lullin.

== History of Hirmentaz station ==
In 1963, under the influence of the contemporary mayor of Bellevauxe, Armand Félisaz, 37 local artisans pooled their efforts and resources (each contributing 50,000 French francs) to found a sports equipment and platter lift facility, SESAT (société d'équipement sportif et d'aménagement du téleski). They chose Hirmentaz for its ease of access.

The partners themselves carried out the engineering work for the installation of the first lift. There was no snow on the day of the opening ceremony, which took place on the grass. Over 10 years, a new lift was set up approximately every year. In the 1970s, there was discussion of linking the chef-lieu with Hirmentaz via a chair lift, but this was never implemented.

In 2000, an artificial lake was set up for water storage and snow cannons.

In early winter of 2008, an old chair lift from 1977 was donated to Kyrgyzstan, and replaced with a faster model.
