= Quechua (brand) =

French outdoor sport brand

- Industry: Mountaineering, hiking, climbing, Nordic skiing
- Founded: 1997; 29 years ago Domancy, France
- Headquarters: Domancy, Sallanches, France
- Key people: Christian Ollier (International Manager)
- Products: Mountain sports products
- Number of employees: 150
- Parent: Decathlon
- Website: www.decathlon.com

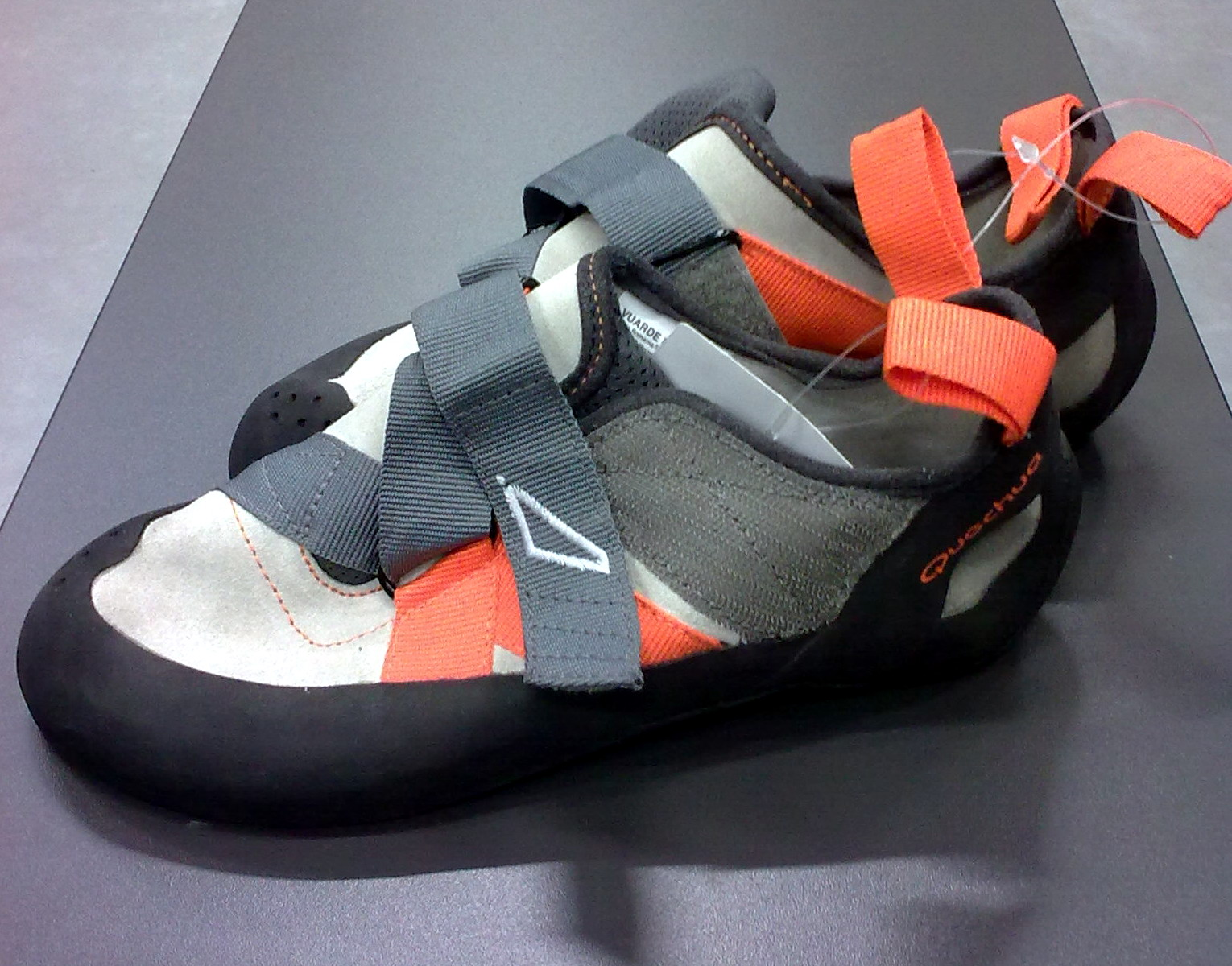
Quechua climbing shoes

Quechua (pronounced /ˈkɛtʃᵊwə/, /ˈkɛtʃuːə/ or /ˈkɛtʃwɑː/; Spanish pronunciation: [ˈketʃwa]) is the trademarked French brand for the hiking and camping apparel and equipment marketed mostly by the French company Decathlon.

== History ==
A group of nine Decathlon employees created the brand in 1997 in Domancy, France.

In the spring of 1998, the group launched its first products, geared towards hikers and campers, in all Decathlon stores. The brand's design center is in Sallanches, near Mont Blanc. Its name derives from the indigenous Quechua people of the Andes and their language.

The first Technical Partnership contracts were signed in 2002. A year later, the company joined the top 10 largest global brands in mountain gear. Publication of the first consumer magazine, covering mountain topics, called Chullanka ('snowed summit' in the Quechua language). The name changed to Quechua Magazine for the seventh issue.

In 2007, the 2 Seconds tents were even noted during high-profile media campaigns against poverty and social exclusion.

During the first decade of the 2000s, the Decathlon Group planned the construction of a large design center near the Mont Blanc massif. The Domancy site hosted more than a hundred employees. Initial development began in 2011 on a 5-hectare (12-acre) site located in the commune of Passy, before halting the following year; work eventually resumed in late 2013.

== Awards and recognition ==
Quechua won two IF Design Awards. The 2seconds tent won the Industrial Design Excellence Awards (IDEA) for the innovation of instant tent.

In 2007, Quechua won three IF Design Awards for the Forclaz 900 jacket, Arpenaz 700 lady shoes and the 2seconds Air tent, and in 2008, won three IF Design Awards for the "All in One Sleeping Bag", the SSV Forclaz and the Bionassay 500 jacket.

== Technical partnership ==
Quechua has partnerships with groups such as mountain guides, national team of young mountaineers and the Ifremmont Institute of Mountain Medical Research. It works with advisers in hiking (Hélène Rochas, Grégory Vollet, Vincent Delebarre, Dachhiri Sherpa), climbing (David Caude), and adventure racing (Quechua Team).
