= Vougy =

Vougy may refer to the following places in France:

- Vougy, Loire, a commune in the Loire department
- Vougy, Haute-Savoie, a commune in the Haute-Savoie department
