= Mont Blanc Tunnel =

Highway tunnel underneath the Alps connecting France and Italy

- Location in the western Alps
- Interactive map of Mont Blanc Tunnel

Overview
- Other names: Tunnel du Mont-Blanc (French); Traforo del Monte Bianco (Italian)
- Location: France; Italy
- Coordinates: 45.854°N 6.914°E
- Status: Open
- Route: RN205; T1
- Start: Chamonix, Haute-Savoie, France
- End: Courmayeur, Aosta Valley, Italy

Operation
- Work began: May 1959 (1946)
- Constructed: 1959–65
- Opened: 19 July 1965
- Operator: MBT-EEIG, controlled by both ATMB and SITMB
- Traffic: Automotive
- Character: Passenger and freight
- Toll: €48 (one-way), 2020 passenger vehicle over €300 (one-way), three or more axles

Technical
- Length: 11.611 km (7.215 mi)
- No. of lanes: 2
- Operating speed: 50–70 km/h (31–43 mph)
- Max elevation: 1,395 m (4,577 ft) center
- Min elevation: 1,274 m (4,180 ft); France (NW)
- Tunnel clearance: 4.35 m (14.3 ft)
- Width: 8.6 m (28 ft)

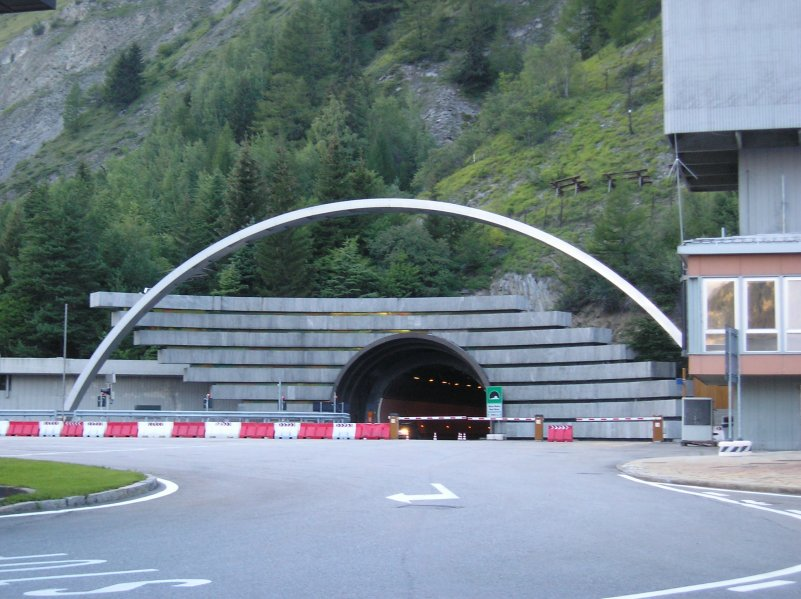
Mont Blanc Tunnel in Italy

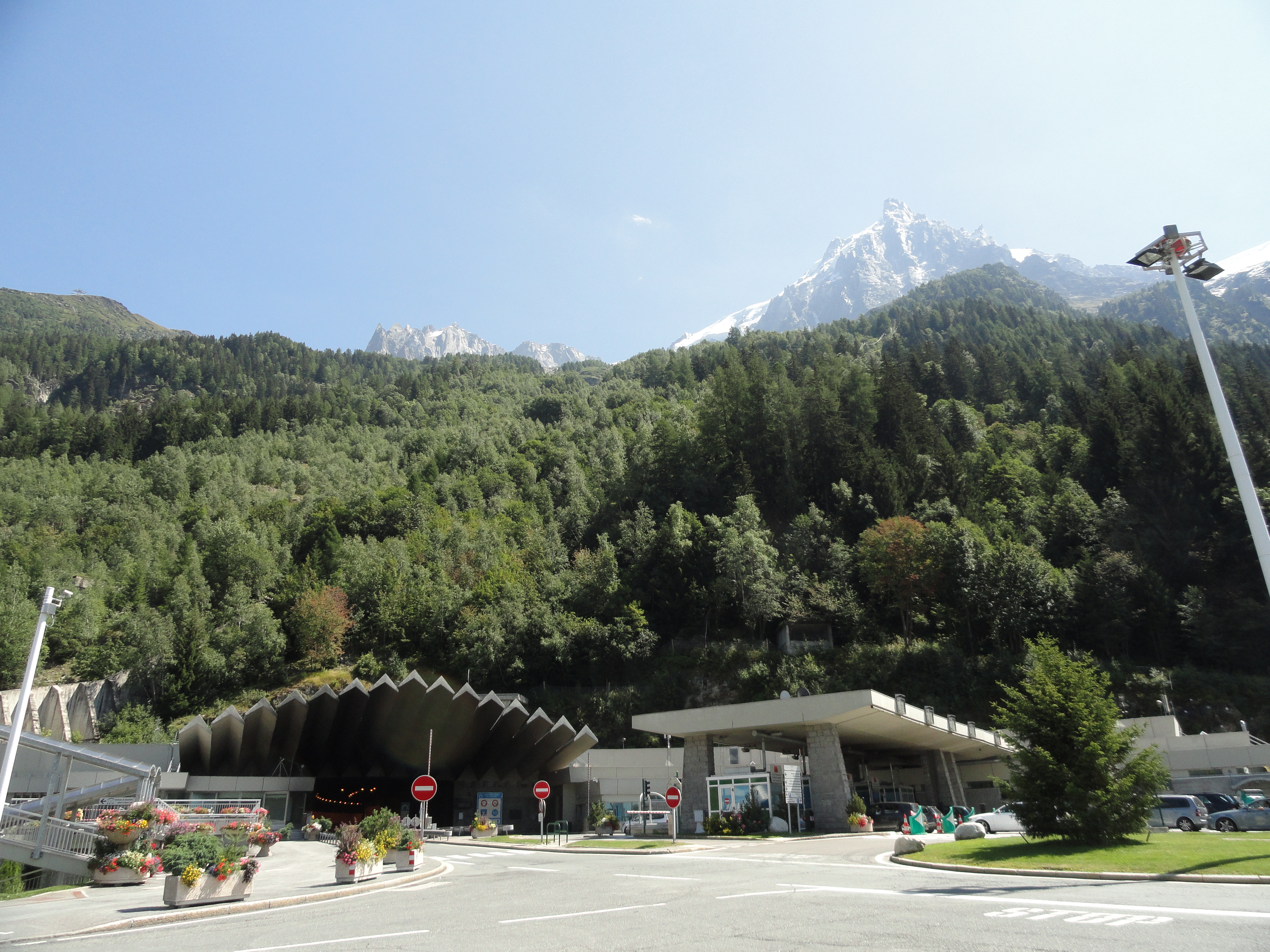
Mont Blanc Tunnel in France

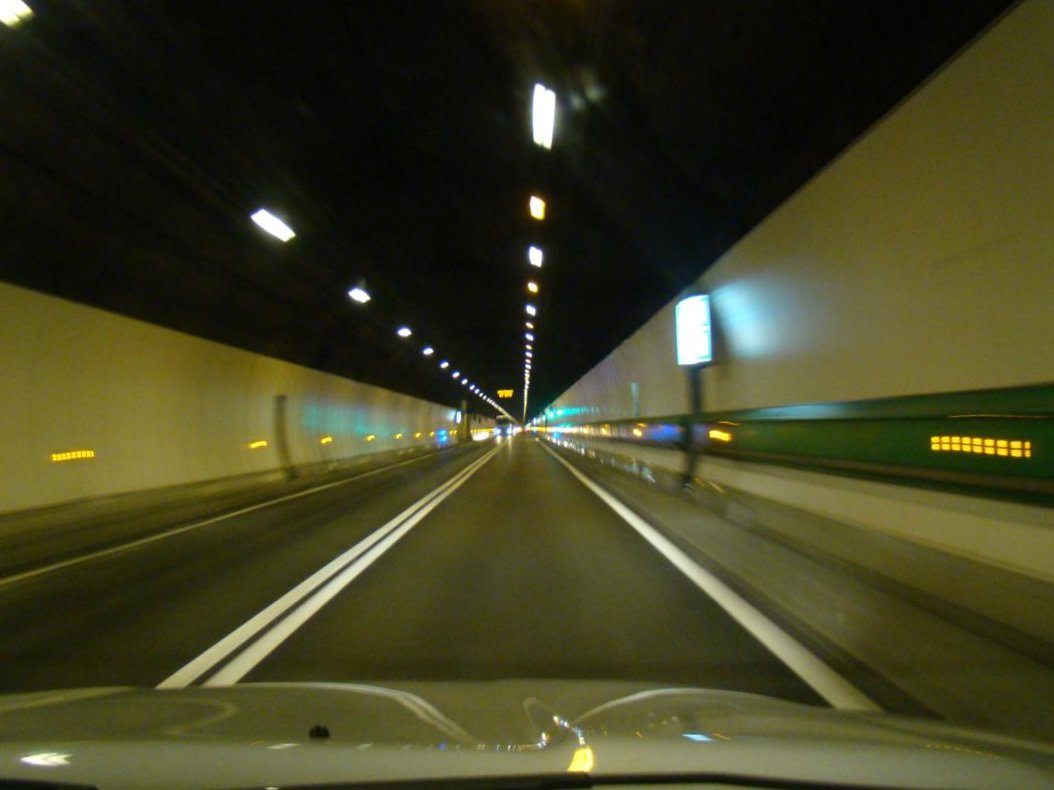
Mont Blanc Tunnel in 2008

The Mont Blanc Tunnel (French: Tunnel du Mont-Blanc, Italian: Traforo del Monte Bianco) is a highway tunnel between France and Italy, under Mont Blanc in the Alps. It links Chamonix, Haute-Savoie, France with Courmayeur, Aosta Valley, Italy, via the French Route Nationale 205 and the Italian Traforo T1 (forming the European route E25), in particular the motorways serving Geneva (A40 of France) and Turin (A5 of Italy). The passageway is one of the major trans-Alpine transport routes, particularly for Italy, which relies on this tunnel for transporting as much as one-third of its freight to northern Europe. It reduces the route from France to Turin by 50 kilometres (30 miles) and to Milan by 100 km (60 mi). Northeast of Mont Blanc's summit, the tunnel is about 15 km (10 mi) southwest of the tripoint with Switzerland, near Mont Dolent.

The agreement between France and Italy on building a tunnel was signed in 1949. Two operating companies were founded, each responsible for one half of the tunnel: the French Autoroutes et tunnel du Mont-Blanc (ATMB), founded on 30 April 1958, and the Italian Società italiana per azioni per il Traforo del Monte Bianco (SITMB), founded on 1 September 1957. Drilling began in 1959 and was completed in 1962; the tunnel was opened to traffic on 19 July 1965.

The tunnel is 11.611 km (7.215 mi) in length, 8.6 m (28 ft) in width, and 4.35 m (14.3 ft) in height. The passageway is not horizontal, but in a slight inverted "V", which assists ventilation and water drainage. The tunnel consists of a single gallery with a two-lane dual direction road. At the time of its construction, it was twice as long as any existing highway tunnel.

The tunnel passes almost exactly under the summit of the Aiguille du Midi. At this spot, it lies 2,480 metres (8,140 ft) beneath the surface, making it the world's second deepest operational tunnel after the Gotthard Base Tunnel.

The Mont Blanc Tunnel was originally managed by the two building companies. Following a fire in 1999 in which 39 people died, which showed how lack of coordination could hamper the safety of the tunnel, all the operations are managed by a single entity: MBT-EEIG, controlled by both ATMB and SITMB together, through a 50–50 shares distribution.

An alternative route for road traffic between France to Italy is the Fréjus Road Tunnel. Road traffic grew steadily until 1994, even with the opening of the Fréjus tunnel. Since then, the combined traffic volume of the two has decreased only slightly.

== Construction statistics ==
- Workforce: five engineers and 350 workmen worked an estimated grand total of 4.6 million man-hours to complete the project
- Explosives: 711 tonnes (700 long tons; 784 short tons) of explosives were used to blast 555,000 m^{3} (19,600,000 cu ft) of rock
- Energy: 37 million kWh and 2,700,000 litres (590,000 imp gal; 710,000 US gal) of fuel for trucks and engines
- Other facts: 771,240 bolts, 6,900 drill rods, and 300 tonnes (300 long tons; 330 short tons) of iron were used to support the vault, 5,000 m^{3} (180,000 cu ft) of formwork for 60,000 tonnes (59,000 long tons; 66,000 short tons) of cement (mixed with 280,000 m^{3} (9,900,000 cu ft) of aggregates)

== History ==
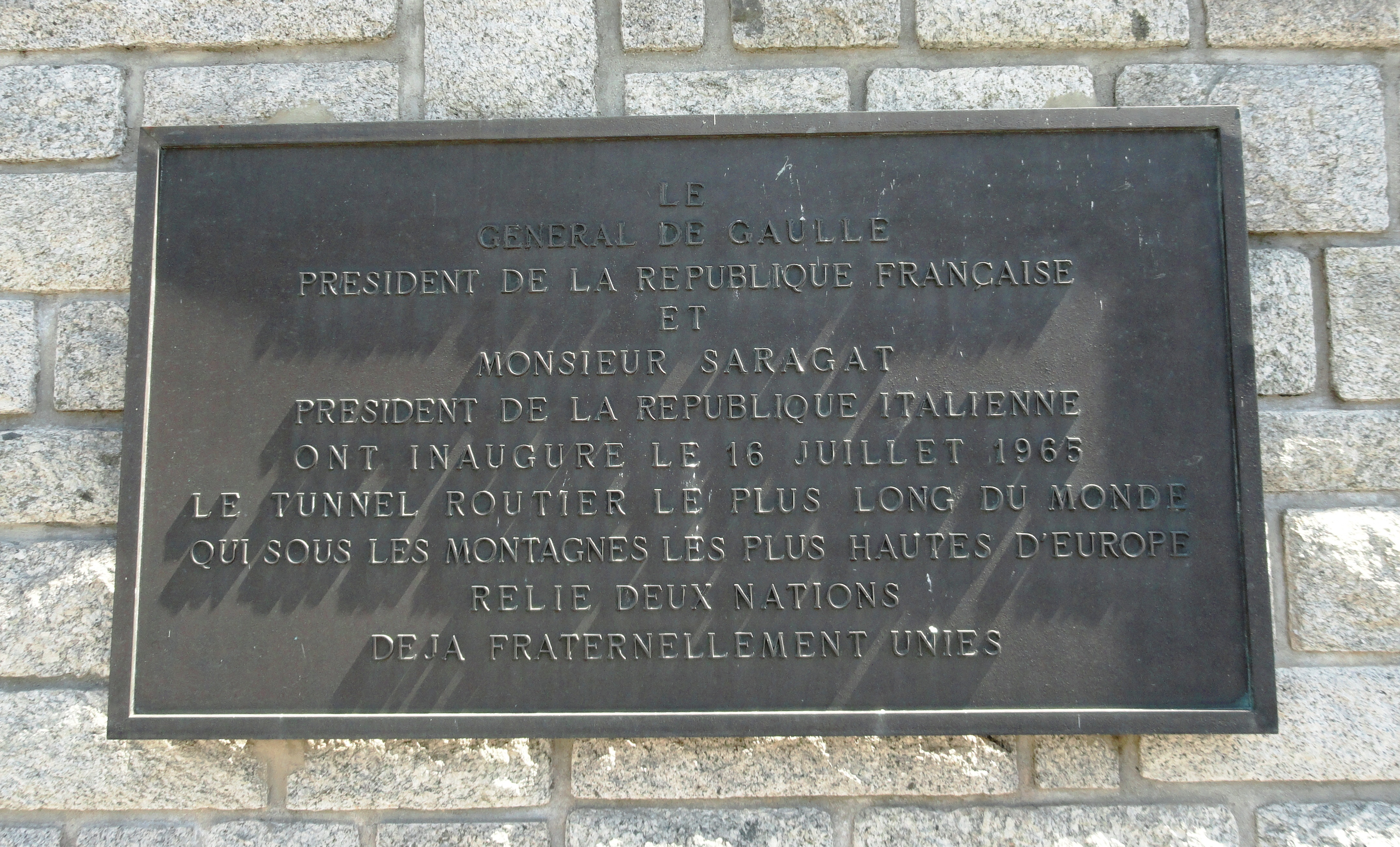
Inaugural Plaque, French side

The idea of building a tunnel underneath Mont Blanc to avoid the need for long journeys dates back to the nineteenth century during the heyday of the railway. However, the idea did not receive widespread attention until 1907, when Francesco Farinet, a Member of Parliament of the Aosta Valley, advocated constructing of the tunnel. In 1908, a first design was presented by French engineer Arnold Monod, to much interest from Italian and French politicians.

=== Agreement between France and Italy and start of construction by 1959 ===
Due to political turmoil and World War I and World War II, the project did not start until 1959, when excavations on the tunnel officially began. This was preceded by the signing of a national charter for the tunnel construction, ratified by the parliaments of France (1957) and Italy (1954). That same year, the STMB (Société du tunnel du Mont Blanc) was formed, which became ATMB (Autoroutes et Tunnel du Mont Blanc) in 1996. In 1962, the French and Italian drilling teams met on 4 August. The opening was successful, with an axis variation of less than 13 centimetres (5 inches).

=== Opening ===
The tunnel was inaugurated by the French president, Charles de Gaulle, and the Italian President, Giuseppe Saragat on 16 July 1965. The tunnel opened to traffic on 19 July. Surveillance cameras were installed in 1978.

=== Updates in the 1990s ===
The tunnel underwent extensive modernisation works in 1990, including the addition of safety features such as new video surveillance cameras, 8 pressurized emergency shelters, a sprinkler system and other safety maintenance. In 1997, a fire detection system was installed along with centralized safety equipment management, and new variable message signs.

=== 1999 fire ===
On the morning of 24 March 1999, the engine of a Belgian transport truck carrying volatile freight caught fire in the tunnel. The event expanded into a catastrophe which killed 39 people.

=== 2002 reopening ===
The fire led to a tunnel closure until 9 March 2002. The reopening followed an extensive overhaul of the safety features. The highway trunk from Aosta to the tunnel on the Italian side was completed in 2007.

== Traffic ==
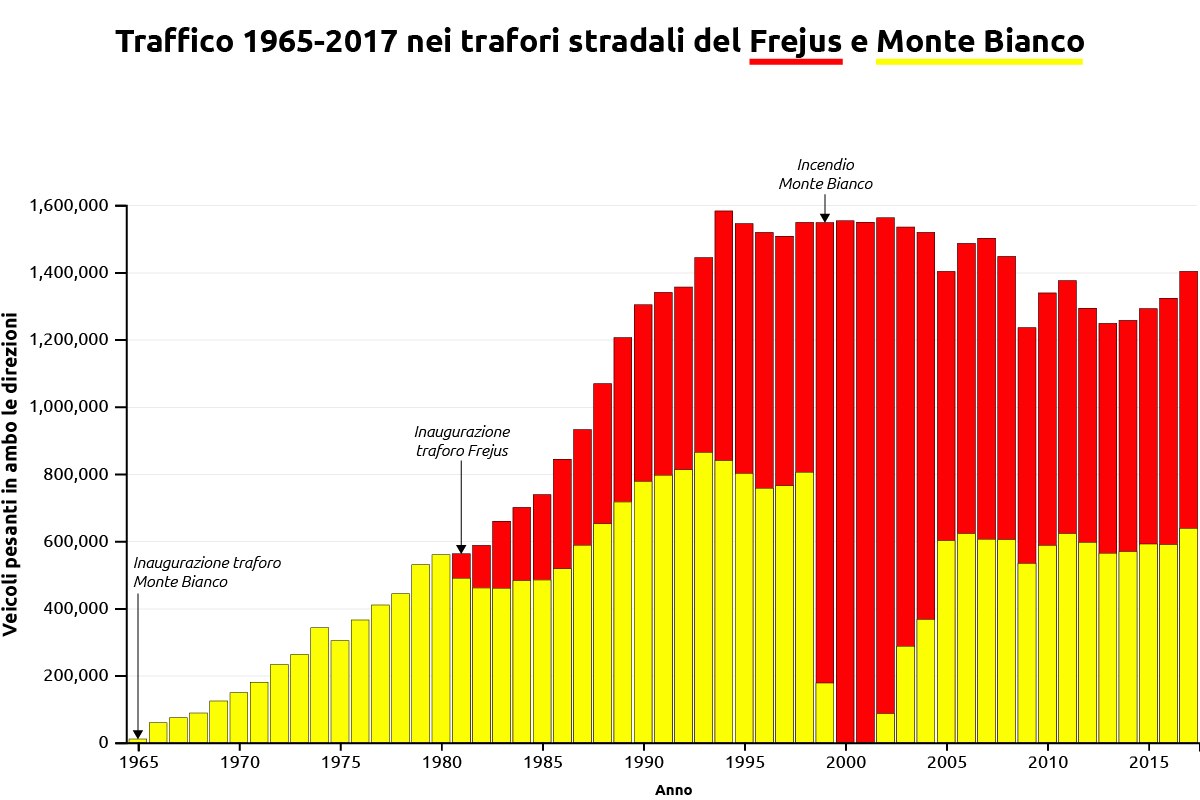
Truck traffic statistics: Mont Blanc and Fréjus Road Tunnels

In 2010, the average traffic volume was 4,945 vehicles per day, or around 1.80 million vehicles per year. In 2011, there were an average of 5,113 vehicles per day (about 1.87 million vehicles per year).

Although several lines of vehicles can queue up at the toll station, only a limited number of vehicles per unit time is allowed to transit the tunnel to ensure a safety distance between them.

Within the tunnel, a minimum speed of 50 km/h and a maximum speed of 70 km/h applies, while the prescribed distance between vehicles is 150 m; trucks are allowed to enter in groups of five. These security measures were taken as a consequence of the 1999 tunnel fire.

Pedestrians can cross the tunnel by bus; bicycles can also be carried through the tunnel with a reservation.

== Toll ==
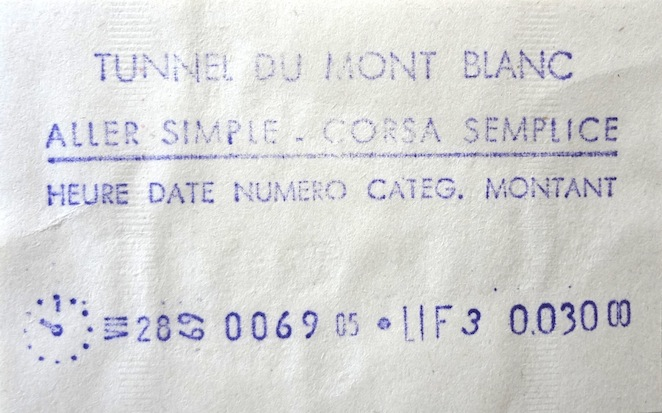
Receipt for tunnel crossing of 28 July 1969

The tunnel crossing is subject to a toll; the toll differs from Italy to France because of their different VAT rates.

In 2013, the one-way ticket for a car was €40.90 (€41.40 on the Italian side), while the return ticket, valid for 7 days, was €51 (€51.60 on the Italian side). In 2016, the one-way ticket for a car cost €43.50 (€44.20 on the Italian side).

Mont Blanc Tunnel Tolls on the Italian side from 1 January 2022 (22% VAT included)

Vehicle Type	One Way	Return
Cars	€52.30	€65.30
Motorbikes	€34.60	€43.50
Caravans	€69.30	€87.10

Mont Blanc Tunnel Tolls on the French side from 1 January 2022 (20% VAT included)

Vehicle Type	One Way	Return
Cars	€51.50	€64.20
Motorbikes	€34.10	€42.80
Caravans	€68.10	€85.60

== See also ==
- National Geographic Seconds From Disaster episodes
- Mont Blanc tunnel fire

Records
Preceded by Great St Bernard Tunnel; 5.80 km (3.60 mi)	World's longest road tunnel 1965–1978	Succeeded by Arlberg Road Tunnel; 13.98 km (8.69 mi)
