= Marignier =

Marignier Mârni (Savoyard)
- Commune
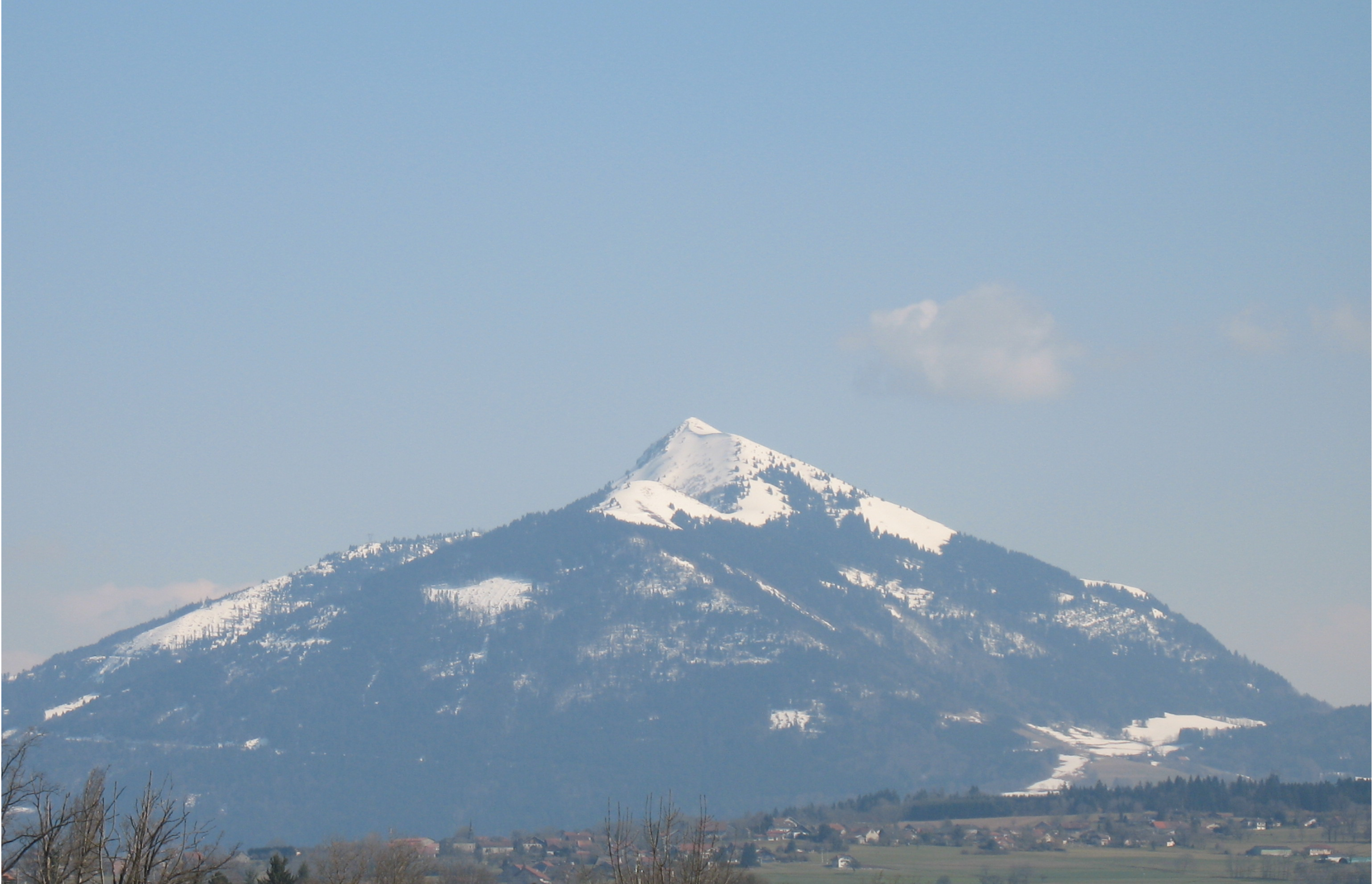
- Le Môle seen from Marignier

- Coat of arms
- Location of Marignier
- Location within France Location within Auvergne-Rhône-Alpes
- Coordinates: 46°05′28″N 6°30′00″E
- Country: France
- Region: Auvergne-Rhône-Alpes
- Department: Haute-Savoie
- Arrondissement: Bonneville
- Canton: Bonneville

Government
  - Mayor (2020–2026): Christophe Pery
- Area^{1}: 19.97 km^{2} (7.71 sq mi)
- Highest elevation: 1,860 m (6,100 ft)
- Lowest elevation: 453 m (1,486 ft)
- Population (2023): 6,507
  - Density: 325.8/km^{2} (843.9/sq mi)
- Time zone: UTC+01:00 (CET)
  - Summer (DST): UTC+02:00 (CEST)
- INSEE/Postal code: 74164 /74970
- ^{1} French Land Register data, which excludes lakes, ponds, glaciers > 1 km^{2} (0.386 sq mi or 247 acres) and river estuaries.

Marignier (French pronunciation: [maʁiɲe]; Savoyard: Mârni) is a commune in the Haute-Savoie department in the Auvergne-Rhône-Alpes region in south-eastern France.

== Population ==
Historical population
Year	Pop.	±% p.a.
1968	3,070	—
1975	3,451	+1.69%
1982	3,679	+0.92%
1990	4,322	+2.03%
1999	5,323	+2.34%
2007	6,114	+1.75%
2012	6,357	+0.78%
2017	6,445	+0.28%
2023	6,507	+0.16%
Source: INSEE

== Transport ==
The commune has a railway station, Marignier, on the La Roche-sur-Foron–Saint-Gervais-les-Bains-Le Fayet line.

== See also ==
- Communes of the Haute-Savoie department
