= Brizon, Haute-Savoie =

Brizon
- Commune
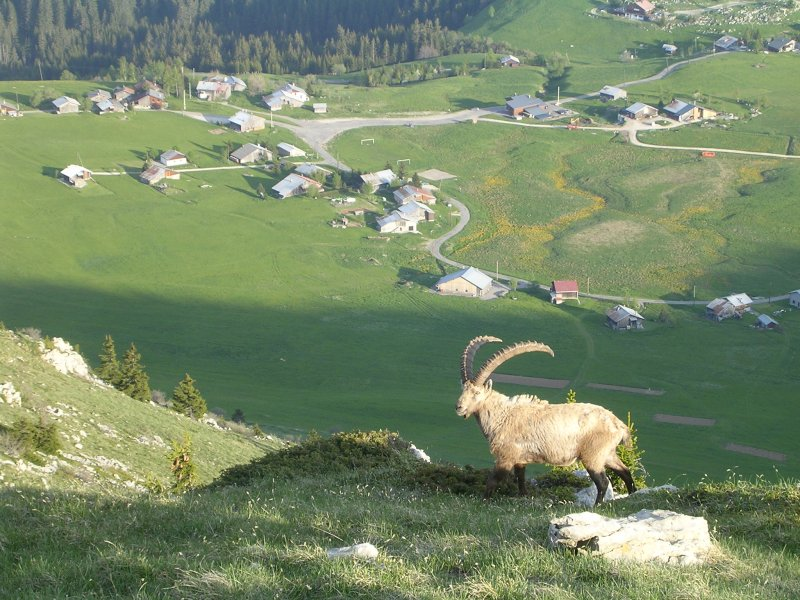
- View of Brizon with an Alpine ibex in the foreground

- Coat of arms
- Location of Brizon
- Location within France Location within Auvergne-Rhône-Alpes
- Coordinates: 46°02′56″N 6°26′44″E
- Country: France
- Region: Auvergne-Rhône-Alpes
- Department: Haute-Savoie
- Arrondissement: Bonneville
- Canton: Bonneville

Government
  - Mayor (2020–2026): Didier Layat
- Area^{1}: 10.39 km^{2} (4.01 sq mi)
- Highest elevation: 1,936 m (6,352 ft)
- Lowest elevation: 707 m (2,320 ft)
- Population (2023): 457
  - Density: 44.0/km^{2} (114/sq mi)
- Time zone: UTC+01:00 (CET)
  - Summer (DST): UTC+02:00 (CEST)
- INSEE/Postal code: 74049 /74130
- Website: Mairie-brison.fr
- ^{1} French Land Register data, which excludes lakes, ponds, glaciers > 1 km^{2} (0.386 sq mi or 247 acres) and river estuaries.

Brizon (French pronunciation: [bʁizɔ̃]; Arpitan: Beurzon) is a commune in the Haute-Savoie département in the Auvergne-Rhône-Alpes region in south-eastern France.

The Col de Solaison ski area is within the commune.

== Personalities linked to the Place ==
- Eugène Bourgeau, botanist, born in the commune in 1813.

== See also ==
- Communes of the Haute-Savoie department
