= Onnion =

Onnion Onyon (Savoyard)
- Commune
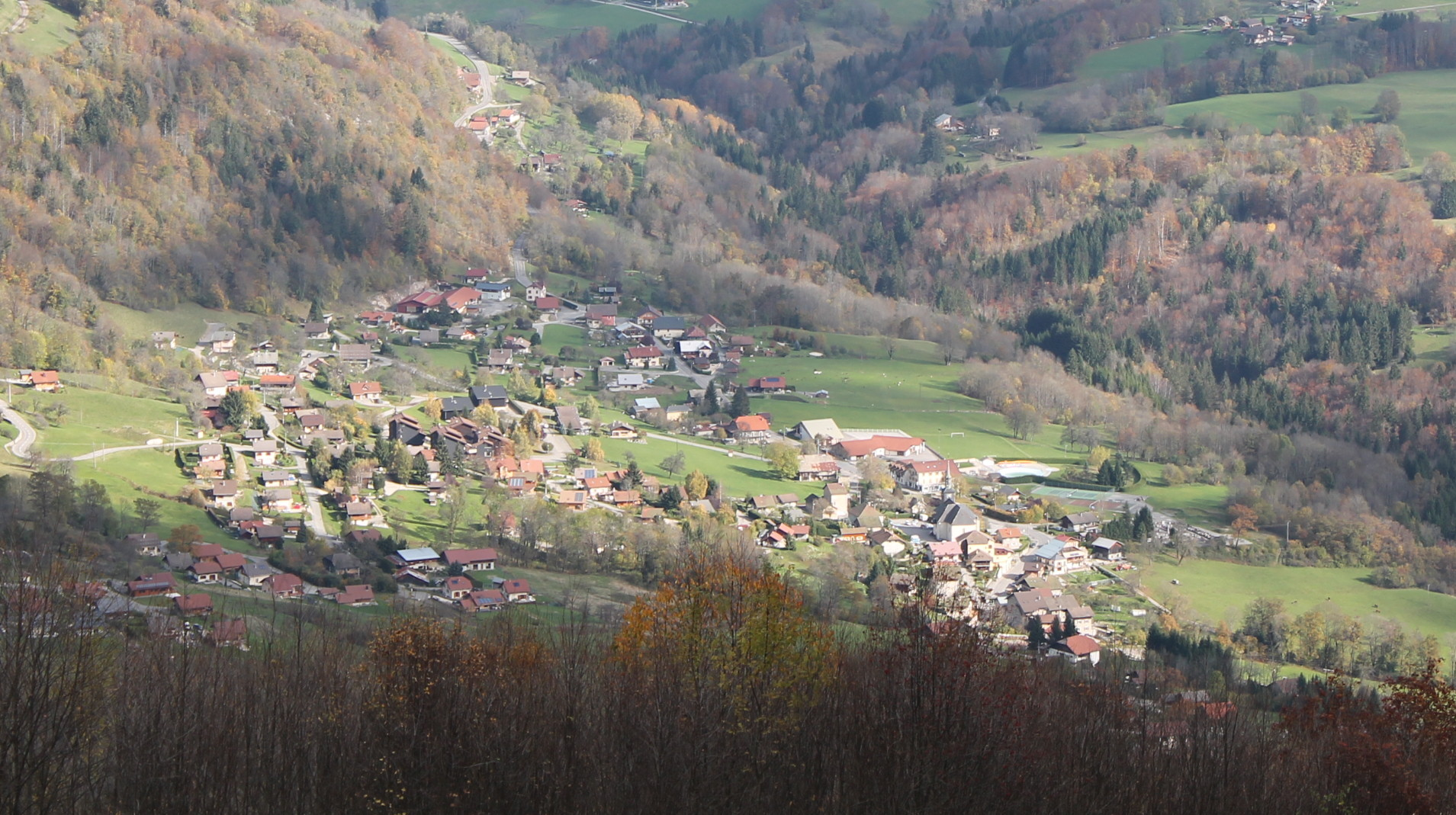
- A general view of Onnion
- Location of Onnion
- Location within France Location within Auvergne-Rhône-Alpes
- Coordinates: 46°10′19″N 6°28′47″E
- Country: France
- Region: Auvergne-Rhône-Alpes
- Department: Haute-Savoie
- Arrondissement: Bonneville
- Canton: Bonneville

Government
  - Mayor (2024–2026): André Gervais
- Area^{1}: 18.97 km^{2} (7.32 sq mi)
- Highest elevation: 1,581 m (5,187 ft)
- Lowest elevation: 683 m (2,241 ft)
- Population (2023): 1,299
  - Density: 68.48/km^{2} (177.4/sq mi)
- Time zone: UTC+01:00 (CET)
  - Summer (DST): UTC+02:00 (CEST)
- INSEE/Postal code: 74205 /74490
- Website: Villagedonnion.free.fr
- ^{1} French Land Register data, which excludes lakes, ponds, glaciers > 1 km^{2} (0.386 sq mi or 247 acres) and river estuaries.

Onnion (French pronunciation: [ɔnjɔ̃]; Savoyard: Onyon) is a commune in the Haute-Savoie department in the Auvergne-Rhône-Alpes region in south-eastern France.

== See also ==
- Communes of the Haute-Savoie department
