= Fillinges =

Commune in Auvergne-Rhône-Alpes, France

Fillinges Flinzho (Savoyard)
- Commune
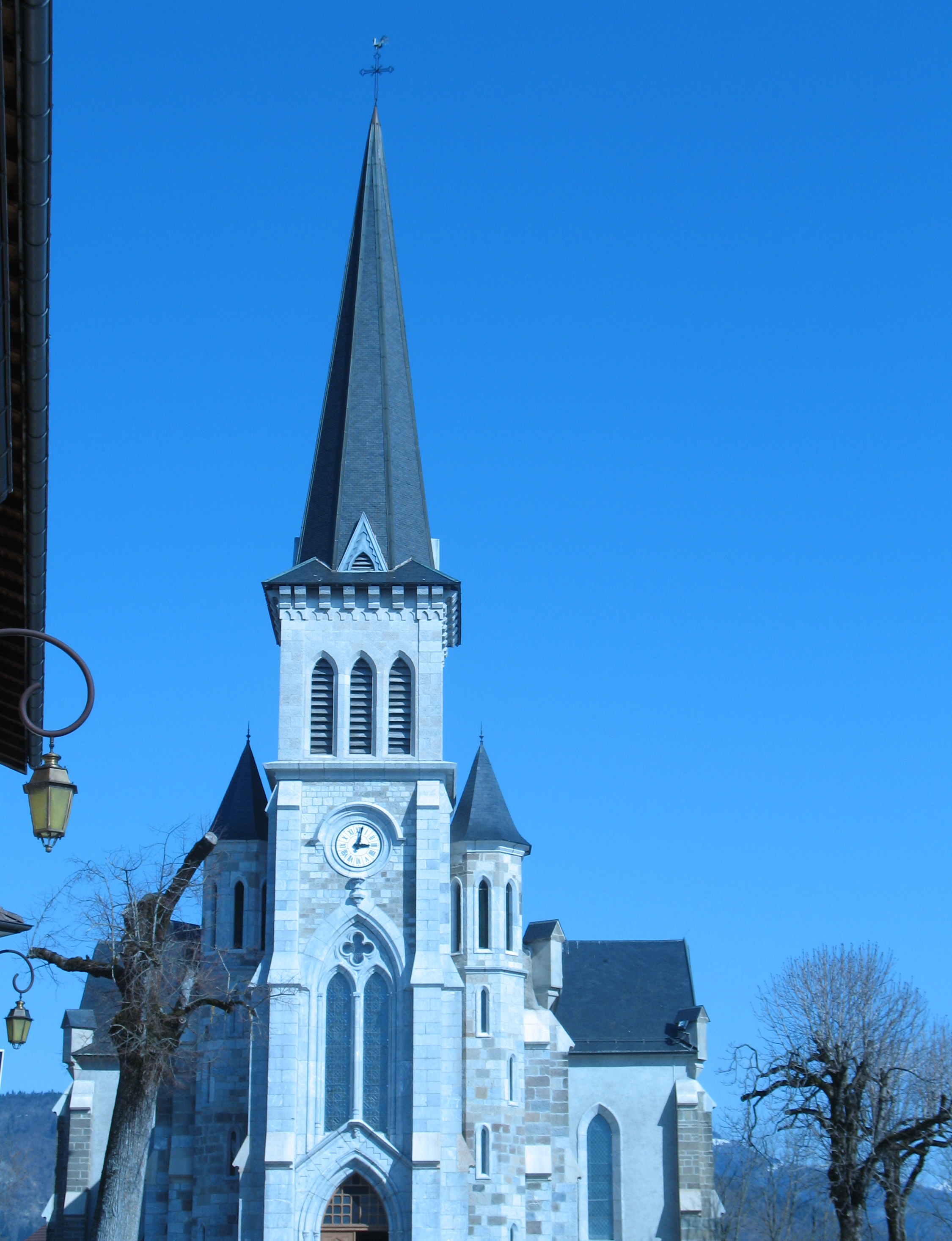
- The church in Fillinges

- Coat of arms
- Location of Fillinges
- Location within France Location within Auvergne-Rhône-Alpes
- Coordinates: 46°09′00″N 6°19′00″E
- Country: France
- Region: Auvergne-Rhône-Alpes
- Department: Haute-Savoie
- Arrondissement: Bonneville
- Canton: Bonneville
- Intercommunality: Quatre Rivières

Government
  - Mayor (2020–2026): Bruno Forel
- Area^{1}: 11.67 km^{2} (4.51 sq mi)
- Highest elevation: 1,287 m (4,222 ft)
- Lowest elevation: 473 m (1,552 ft)
- Population (2023): 3,671
  - Density: 314.6/km^{2} (814.7/sq mi)
- Time zone: UTC+01:00 (CET)
  - Summer (DST): UTC+02:00 (CEST)
- INSEE/Postal code: 74128 /
- ^{1} French Land Register data, which excludes lakes, ponds, glaciers > 1 km^{2} (0.386 sq mi or 247 acres) and river estuaries.

Fillinges (French pronunciation: [filɛ̃ʒ]; Savoyard: Flinzho) is a Commune in Haute-Savoie, in Auvergne-Rhône-Alpes region in south-eastern France. It is part of Greater Geneva. The commune lies between 473 and 1,287 m above sea level and has a total area of 11.67 km^{2}. The village is 7.4 km from Annemasse. Its inhabitants are named Fillingeoises and Fillingeois.

== History ==
The population, having experienced few majors migrations in the seventeenth and eighteenth centuries, Fillinges is an inexhaustible reservoir for genealogists around the world. The Berthet, Ducret, Gavard and many other families find their origins, often with nicknames related to the specific place of residence or the activity of their ancestor: farrier, roadmender, clog maker, armourer, shoemaker, baker etc. (Labori, Socqui etc.). At that time, marriages were often "arranged" in between families and took place nearly all the time between inhabitants of the municipality or hamlets in the vicinity (Arpigny, Marcellaz, Viuz, La Tour, Bonne, Mijouet, Loëx, etc.).

In the nineteenth century, several people are market gardeners and sell (on foot, of course) their production on the markets of Annemasse and Geneva. Others, with the experience of the vineyard will offer their services on farms and vineyards of Crépy, or even the canton of Vaud (Switzerland) - Nyon region in particular. Others will look further: the Lyon surroundings, Paris, even the Americas (North and South). The majority of the Berthet of Geneva have a common ancestor native of Fillinges.

Between 1780 and 1837, Fillinges is part of the province of Carouge, which belongs to the States of Savoie.

== Population ==
Historical population
Year	Pop.	±% p.a.
1968	1,133	—
1975	1,508	+4.17%
1982	1,619	+1.02%
1990	2,005	+2.71%
1999	2,441	+2.21%
2007	2,955	+2.42%
2012	3,229	+1.79%
2017	3,413	+1.11%
2023	3,671	+1.22%
Source: INSEE

== See also ==
- Communes of the Haute-Savoie department
