= Marcellaz =

- Commune
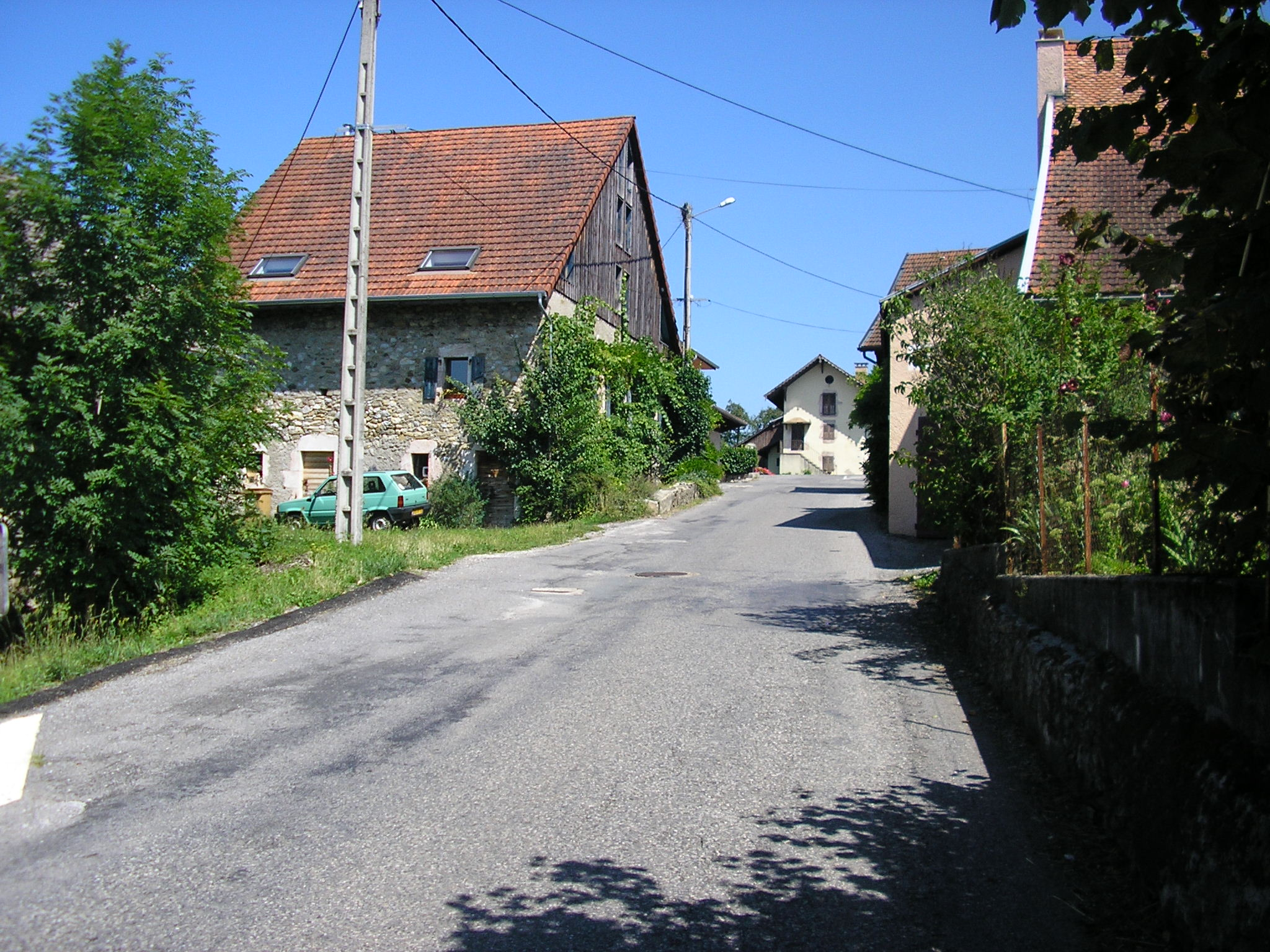
- The road through Marcellaz

- Coat of arms
- Location of Marcellaz
- Location within France Location within Auvergne-Rhône-Alpes
- Coordinates: 46°08′43″N 6°21′19″E
- Country: France
- Region: Auvergne-Rhône-Alpes
- Department: Haute-Savoie
- Arrondissement: Bonneville
- Canton: Bonneville
- Intercommunality: CC des Quatre Rivières

Government
  - Mayor (2024–2026): Léon Gavillet
- Area^{1}: 4.17 km^{2} (1.61 sq mi)
- Highest elevation: 706 m (2,316 ft)
- Lowest elevation: 540 m (1,770 ft)
- Population (2023): 1,082
  - Density: 259/km^{2} (672/sq mi)
- Time zone: UTC+01:00 (CET)
  - Summer (DST): UTC+02:00 (CEST)
- INSEE/Postal code: 74162 /74250
- ^{1} French Land Register data, which excludes lakes, ponds, glaciers > 1 km^{2} (0.386 sq mi or 247 acres) and river estuaries.

Marcellaz is a commune in the Haute-Savoie department in the Auvergne-Rhône-Alpes region in south-eastern France.

== Toponymy ==
As with many polysyllabic Arpitan toponyms or anthroponyms, the final -x marks oxytonic stress (on the last syllable), whereas the final -z indicates paroxytonic stress (on the penultimate syllable) and should not be pronounced, although in French it is often mispronounced due to hypercorrection.

== See also ==
- Communes of the Haute-Savoie department
