= Mégevette =

Mégevette Mezhvèta (Savoyard)
- Commune
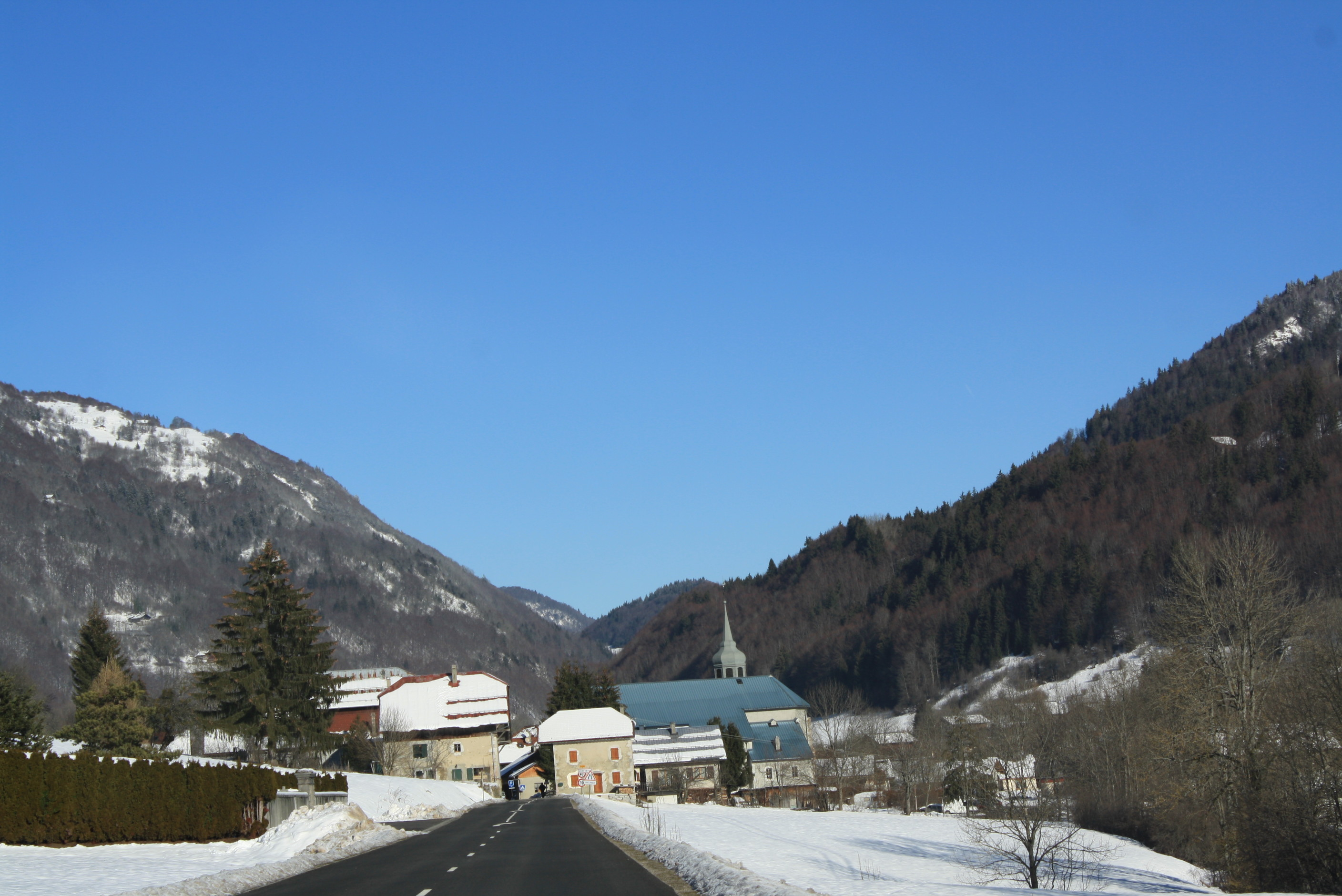
- A general view of Mégevette

- Coat of arms
- Location of Mégevette
- Location within France Location within Auvergne-Rhône-Alpes
- Coordinates: 46°12′00″N 6°29′55″E
- Country: France
- Region: Auvergne-Rhône-Alpes
- Department: Haute-Savoie
- Arrondissement: Bonneville
- Canton: Bonneville

Government
  - Mayor (2020–2026): Max Meynet-Cordonnier
- Area^{1}: 21.66 km^{2} (8.36 sq mi)
- Highest elevation: 1,760 m (5,770 ft)
- Lowest elevation: 856 m (2,808 ft)
- Population (2023): 619
  - Density: 28.6/km^{2} (74.0/sq mi)
- Demonym: Mégevans
- Time zone: UTC+01:00 (CET)
  - Summer (DST): UTC+02:00 (CEST)
- INSEE/Postal code: 74174 /74490
- ^{1} French Land Register data, which excludes lakes, ponds, glaciers > 1 km^{2} (0.386 sq mi or 247 acres) and river estuaries.

Mégevette (French pronunciation: [meʒvɛt]; Savoyard: Mezhvèta) is a commune in the Haute-Savoie department in the Auvergne-Rhône-Alpes region in south-eastern France.

== See also ==
- Communes of the Haute-Savoie department
