= Saint-Dalmas-le-Selvage =

Commune in Provence-Alpes-Côte d'Azur, France

- Commune
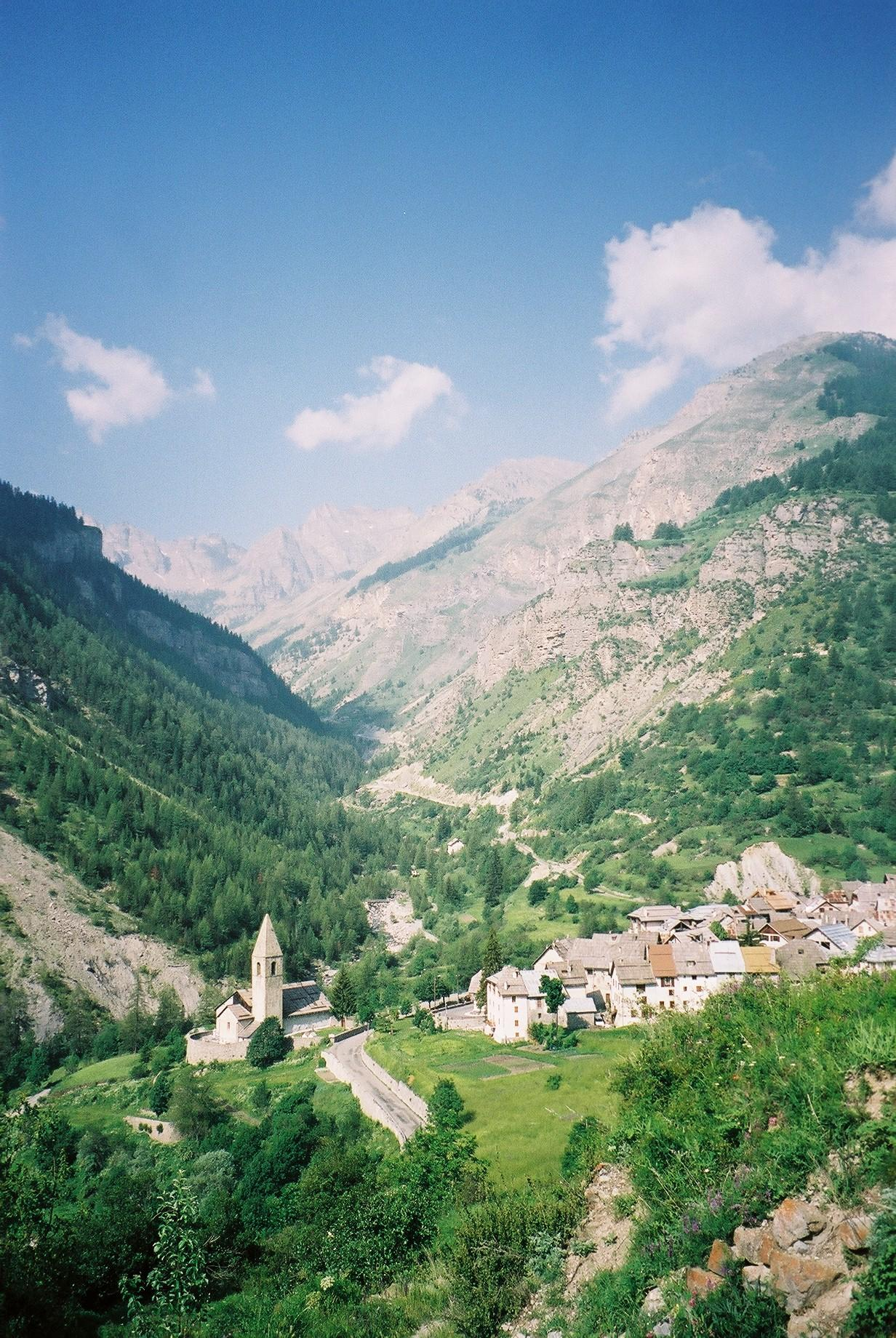
- A general view of the village

- Coat of arms
- Location of Saint-Dalmas-le-Selvage
- Location within France Location within Provence-Alpes-Côte d'Azur
- Coordinates: 44°17′06″N 6°52′39″E
- Country: France
- Region: Provence-Alpes-Côte d'Azur
- Department: Alpes-Maritimes
- Arrondissement: Nice
- Canton: Tourrette-Levens
- Intercommunality: Métropole Nice Côte d'Azur

Government
  - Mayor (2026–32): Cedric Issautier
- Area^{1}: 81.03 km^{2} (31.29 sq mi)
- Elevation: 1,480 m (4,860 ft)
- Highest elevation: 2,881 m (9,452 ft)
- Lowest elevation: 1,280 m (4,200 ft)
- Population (2023): 98
  - Density: 1.2/km^{2} (3.1/sq mi)
- Time zone: UTC+01:00 (CET)
  - Summer (DST): UTC+02:00 (CEST)
- INSEE/Postal code: 06119 /06660
- ^{1} French Land Register data, which excludes lakes, ponds, glaciers > 1 km^{2} (0.386 sq mi or 247 acres) and river estuaries.

Saint-Dalmas-le-Selvage (French pronunciation: [sɛ̃ dalmas lə sɛlvaʒ]; Occitan: Sant Darmàs lo Selvatge; Italian: San Dalmazzo Selvatico) is a commune in the Alpes-Maritimes department in southeastern France.

== Population ==
Historical population
Year	Pop.	±% p.a.
1968	152	—
1975	151	−0.09%
1982	121	−3.11%
1990	114	−0.74%
1999	123	+0.85%
2007	132	+0.89%
2012	125	−1.08%
2017	118	−1.15%
2023	98	−3.05%
Source: INSEE

== See also ==
- Communes of the Alpes-Maritimes department
