= Saint-Jean-de-Tholome =

Saint-Jean-de-Tholome San-Dyan (Savoyard)
- Commune
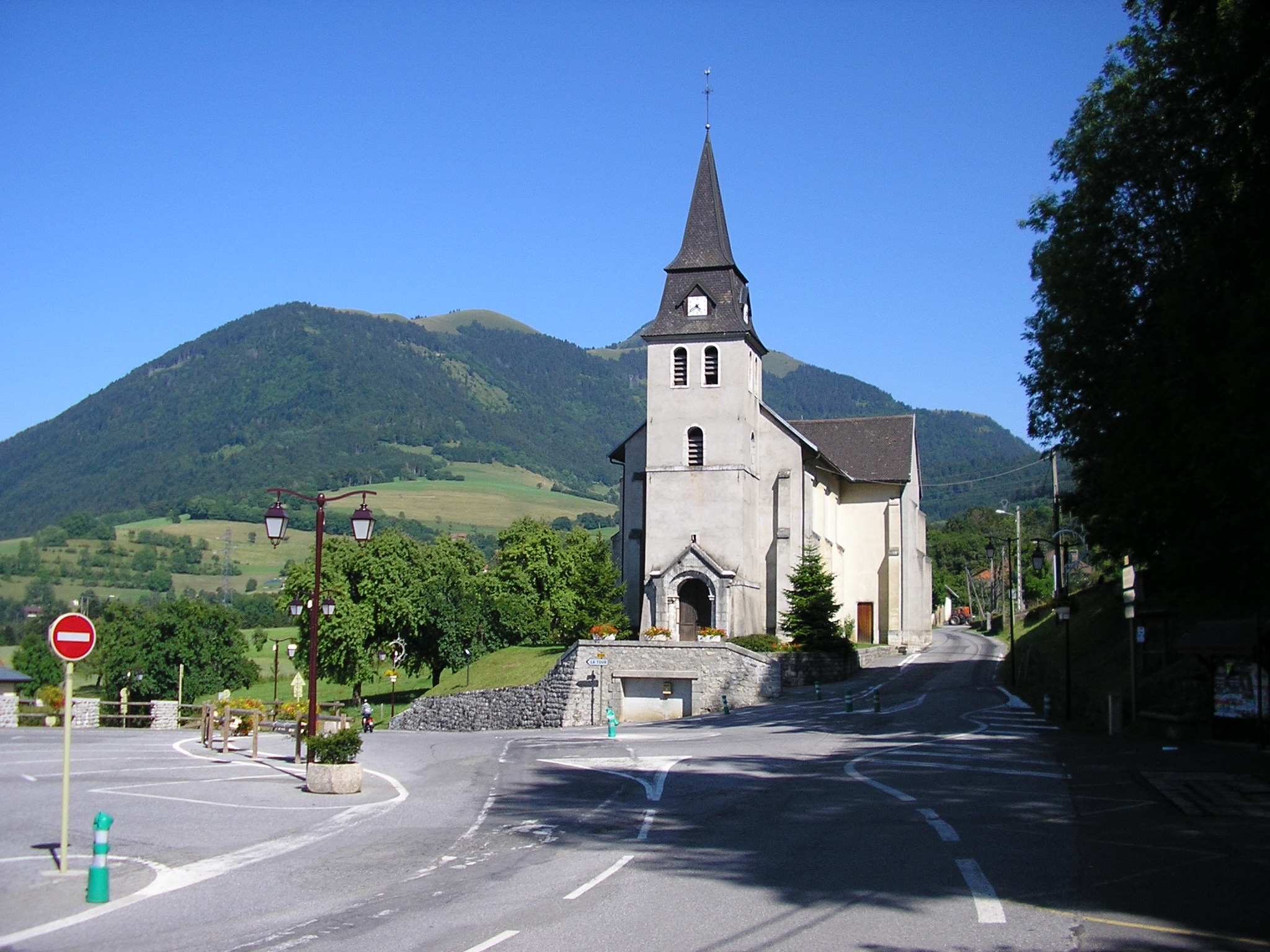
- The church of Saint-Jean-de-Tholome
- Location of Saint-Jean-de-Tholome
- Location within France Location within Auvergne-Rhône-Alpes
- Coordinates: 46°06′45″N 6°23′54″E
- Country: France
- Region: Auvergne-Rhône-Alpes
- Department: Haute-Savoie
- Arrondissement: Bonneville
- Canton: Bonneville

Government
  - Mayor (2020–2026): Sabrina Bertrand
- Area^{1}: 12.37 km^{2} (4.78 sq mi)
- Highest elevation: 1,840 m (6,040 ft)
- Lowest elevation: 613 m (2,011 ft)
- Population (2023): 1,180
  - Density: 95.4/km^{2} (247/sq mi)
- Time zone: UTC+01:00 (CET)
  - Summer (DST): UTC+02:00 (CEST)
- INSEE/Postal code: 74240 /74250
- ^{1} French Land Register data, which excludes lakes, ponds, glaciers > 1 km^{2} (0.386 sq mi or 247 acres) and river estuaries.

Saint-Jean-de-Tholome (French pronunciation: [sɛ̃ ʒɑ̃ də tɔlom]; Savoyard: San-Dyan) is a commune in the Haute-Savoie department in the Auvergne-Rhône-Alpes region in south-eastern France.

== See also ==
- Communes of the Haute-Savoie department
