= Ayse =

Ayse Aïze (Savoyard)
- Commune
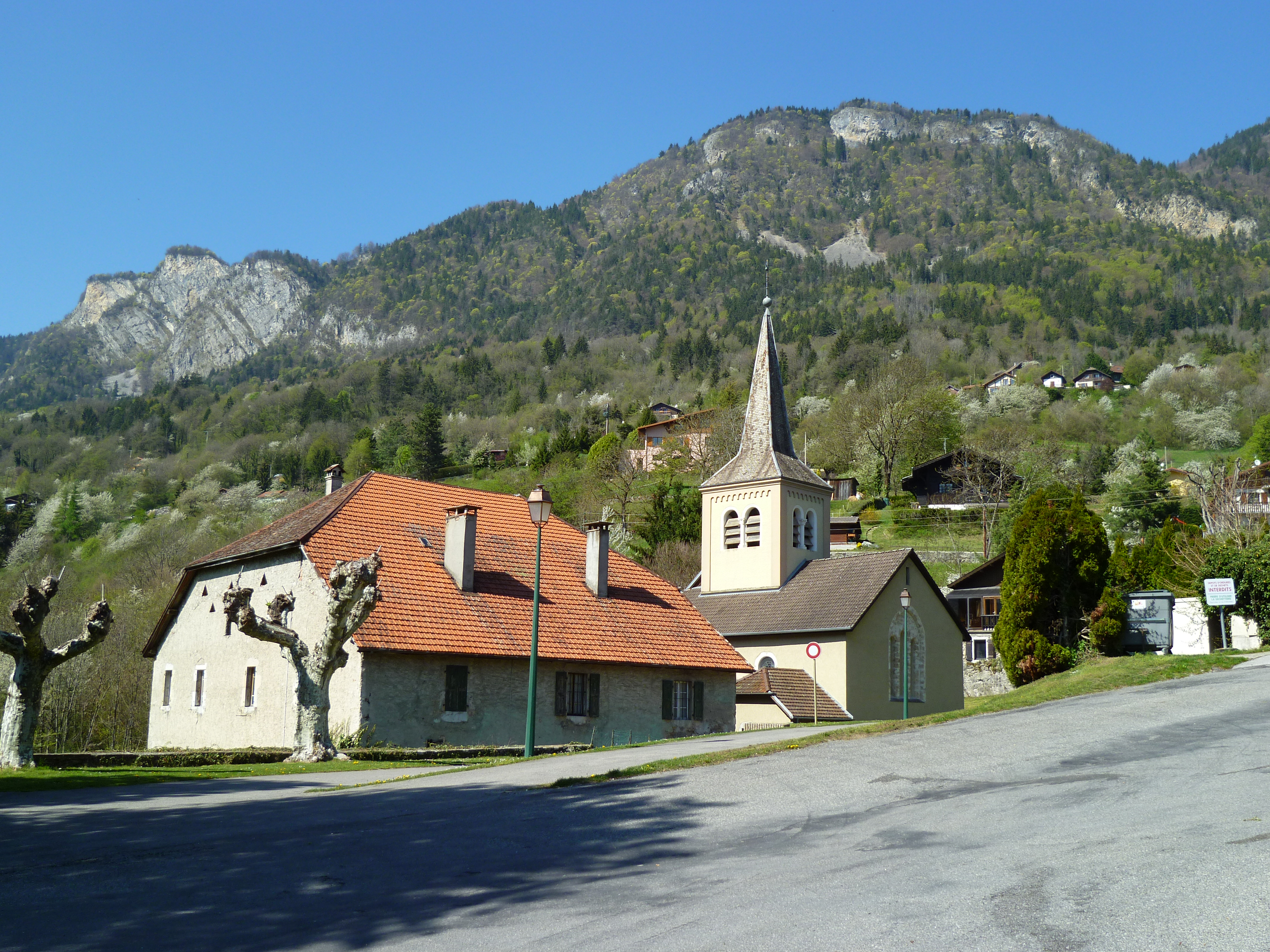
- The church in Ayse

- Coat of arms
- Location of Ayse
- Location within France Location within Auvergne-Rhône-Alpes
- Coordinates: 46°05′00″N 6°26′15″E
- Country: France
- Region: Auvergne-Rhône-Alpes
- Department: Haute-Savoie
- Arrondissement: Bonneville
- Canton: Bonneville
- Intercommunality: CC Fauciny-Glières

Government
  - Mayor (2020–2026): Jean-Pierre Mermin
- Area^{1}: 10.48 km^{2} (4.05 sq mi)
- Highest elevation: 1,843 m (6,047 ft)
- Lowest elevation: 444 m (1,457 ft)
- Population (2023): 2,376
  - Density: 226.7/km^{2} (587.2/sq mi)
- Time zone: UTC+01:00 (CET)
  - Summer (DST): UTC+02:00 (CEST)
- INSEE/Postal code: 74024 /74130
- ^{1} French Land Register data, which excludes lakes, ponds, glaciers > 1 km^{2} (0.386 sq mi or 247 acres) and river estuaries.

Ayse (sometimes written Ayze, French pronunciation: [aiz]; Savoyard: Aïze) is a commune of the Haute-Savoie department in the Auvergne-Rhône-Alpes region in south-eastern France.

== Climate ==
Climate data for Ayse (1991-2020, extremes 1951-present)
Month	Jan	Feb	Mar	Apr	May	Jun	Jul	Aug	Sep	Oct	Nov	Dec	Year
Record high °C (°F)	18.2 (64.8)	22.6 (72.7)	25.7 (78.3)	28.9 (84.0)	33.1 (91.6)	35.8 (96.4)	40.4 (104.7)	40 (104)	33.2 (91.8)	28.6 (83.5)	24 (75)	20.4 (68.7)	40.4 (104.7)
Mean daily maximum °C (°F)	5.0 (41.0)	7.9 (46.2)	13.2 (55.8)	17.3 (63.1)	21.4 (70.5)	25.2 (77.4)	27.5 (81.5)	27.0 (80.6)	22.1 (71.8)	16.5 (61.7)	9.5 (49.1)	5.2 (41.4)	16.5 (61.7)
Daily mean °C (°F)	1.3 (34.3)	2.8 (37.0)	6.9 (44.4)	10.5 (50.9)	14.7 (58.5)	18.4 (65.1)	20.4 (68.7)	20.0 (68.0)	15.9 (60.6)	11.3 (52.3)	5.4 (41.7)	1.8 (35.2)	10.8 (51.4)
Mean daily minimum °C (°F)	−2.4 (27.7)	−2.2 (28.0)	0.5 (32.9)	3.7 (38.7)	8.0 (46.4)	11.5 (52.7)	13.3 (55.9)	13.4 (56.1)	9.6 (49.3)	6.1 (43.0)	1.4 (34.5)	−1.6 (29.1)	5.1 (41.2)
Record low °C (°F)	−23.9 (−11.0)	−23.2 (−9.8)	−15 (5)	−7 (19)	−3.9 (25.0)	−0.8 (30.6)	2.8 (37.0)	3 (37)	−0.5 (31.1)	−5.5 (22.1)	−11.1 (12.0)	−16.5 (2.3)	−23.9 (−11.0)
Average precipitation mm (inches)	80.8 (3.18)	69.8 (2.75)	79.0 (3.11)	91.3 (3.59)	116.8 (4.60)	111.0 (4.37)	109.1 (4.30)	118.9 (4.68)	110.0 (4.33)	104.6 (4.12)	101.4 (3.99)	99.9 (3.93)	1,192.6 (46.95)
Average precipitation days (≥ 1 mm)	10.9	8.9	9.7	10	12.2	10.9	9.7	10.4	9.3	10.7	10.8	11.4	124.8
Source: Meteociel

== Population ==
Historical population
Year	Pop.	±% p.a.
1968	628	—
1975	926	+5.70%
1982	1,262	+4.52%
1990	1,532	+2.45%
1999	1,817	+1.91%
2007	1,944	+0.85%
2012	2,039	+0.96%
2017	2,145	+1.02%
2023	2,376	+1.72%
Source: INSEE

== See also ==
- Communes of the Haute-Savoie department
