= Ville-en-Sallaz =

Ville-en-Sallaz Vla (Savoyard)
- Commune
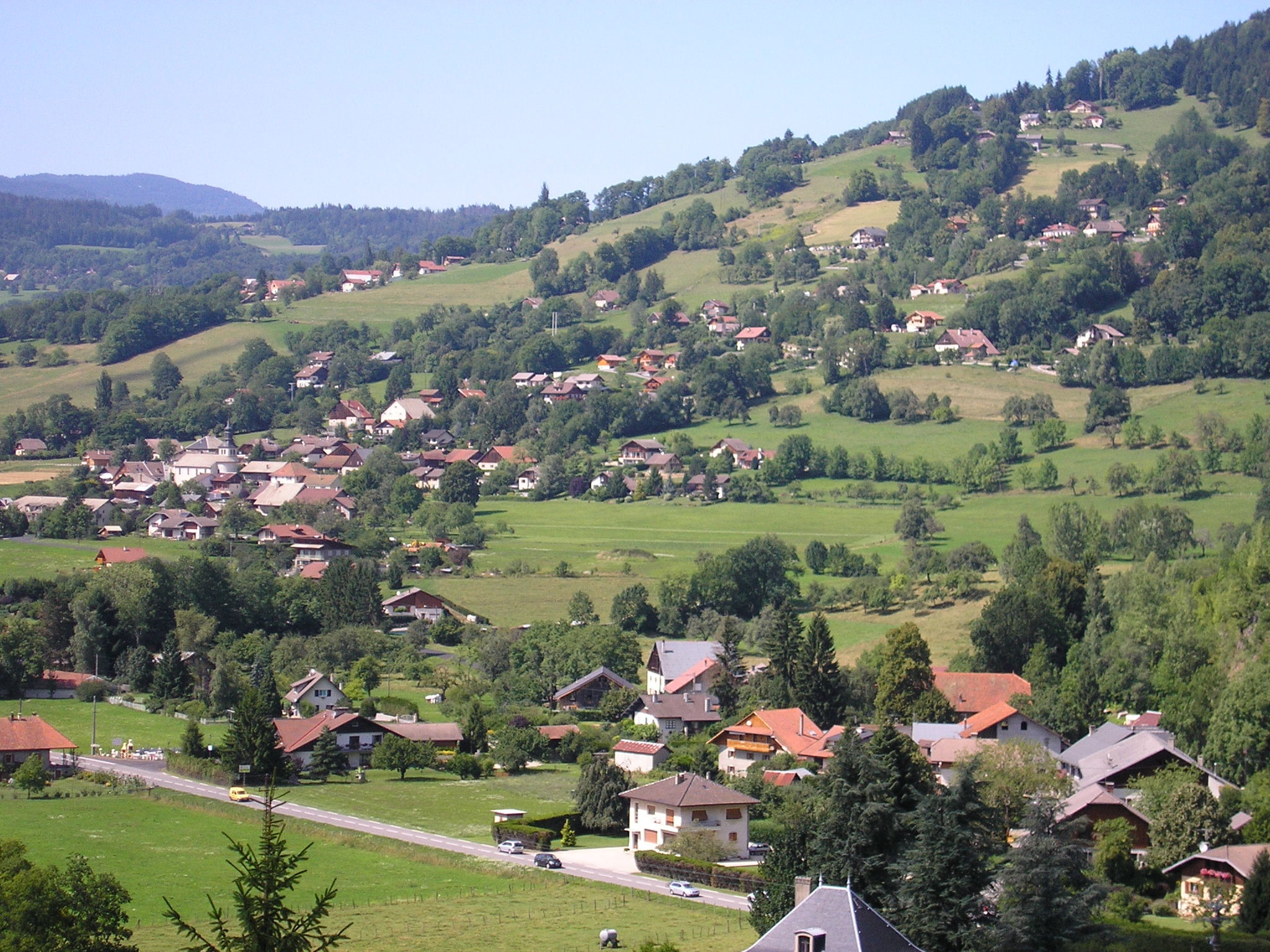
- A general view of Ville-en-Sallaz
- Location of Ville-en-Sallaz
- Location within France Location within Auvergne-Rhône-Alpes
- Coordinates: 46°08′47″N 6°25′23″E
- Country: France
- Region: Auvergne-Rhône-Alpes
- Department: Haute-Savoie
- Arrondissement: Bonneville
- Canton: Bonneville

Government
  - Mayor (2020–2026): Laurette Cheneval
- Area^{1}: 3.37 km^{2} (1.30 sq mi)
- Elevation: 634 m (2,080 ft)
- Highest elevation: 1,380 m (4,530 ft)
- Lowest elevation: 587 m (1,926 ft)
- Population (2023): 899
  - Density: 267/km^{2} (691/sq mi)
- Time zone: UTC+01:00 (CET)
  - Summer (DST): UTC+02:00 (CEST)
- INSEE/Postal code: 74304 /74250
- ^{1} French Land Register data, which excludes lakes, ponds, glaciers > 1 km^{2} (0.386 sq mi or 247 acres) and river estuaries.

Ville-en-Sallaz (French pronunciation: [vil ɑ̃ sala]; Savoyard: Vla) is a commune in the Haute-Savoie department in the Auvergne-Rhône-Alpes region in south-eastern France.

== See also ==
- Communes of the Haute-Savoie department
