= Contamine-sur-Arve =

Contamine-sur-Arve Kontamna (Savoyard)
- Commune
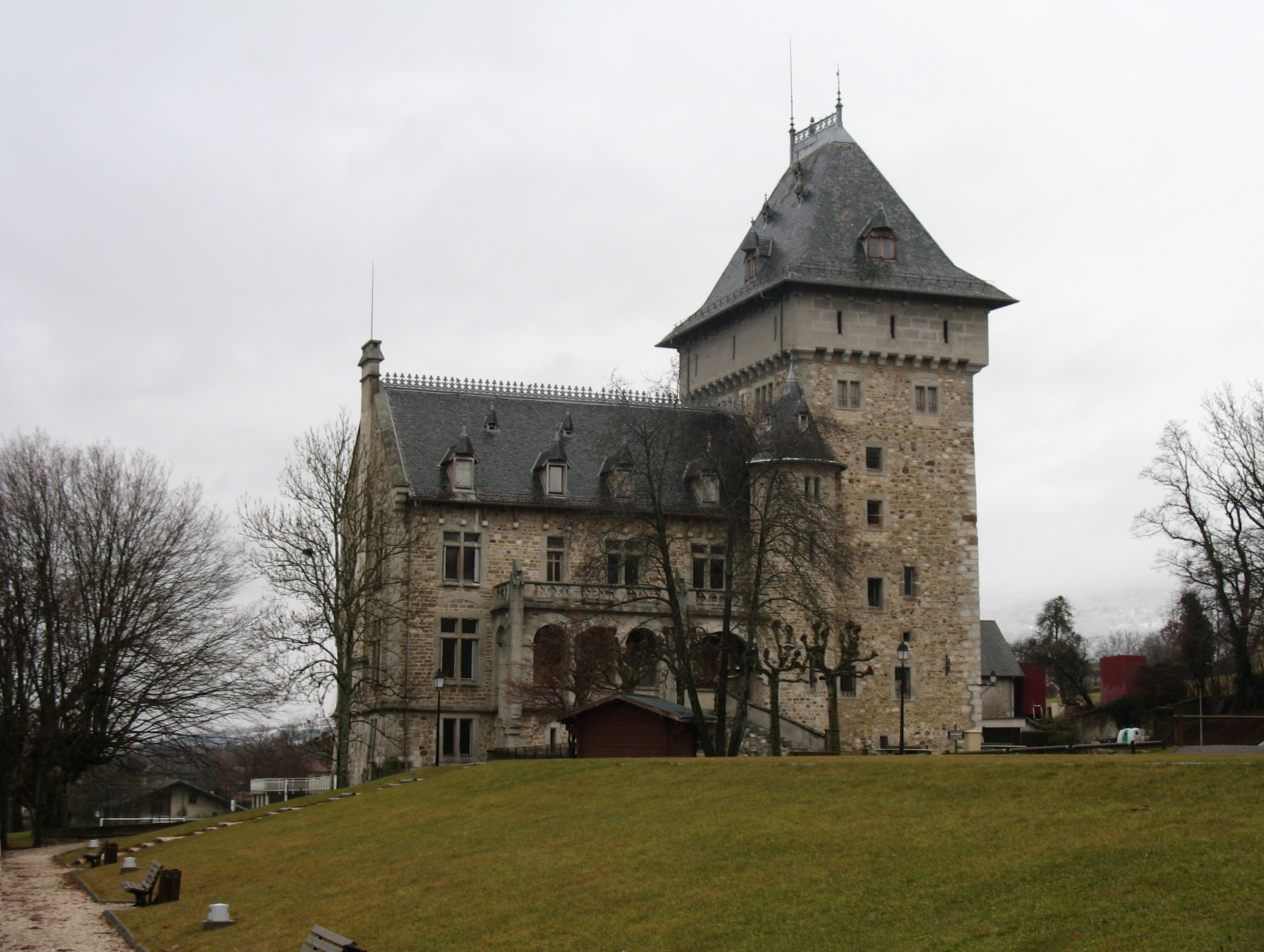
- The Château of Villy, in Contamine-sur-Arve
- Location of Contamine-sur-Arve
- Location within France Location within Auvergne-Rhône-Alpes
- Coordinates: 46°07′45″N 6°20′28″E
- Country: France
- Region: Auvergne-Rhône-Alpes
- Department: Haute-Savoie
- Arrondissement: Bonneville
- Canton: Bonneville
- Intercommunality: CC Faucigny-Glières

Government
  - Mayor (2020–2026): Aline Watt Chevallier
- Area^{1}: 6.92 km^{2} (2.67 sq mi)
- Highest elevation: 697 m (2,287 ft)
- Lowest elevation: 423 m (1,388 ft)
- Population (2023): 2,403
  - Density: 347/km^{2} (899/sq mi)
- Time zone: UTC+01:00 (CET)
  - Summer (DST): UTC+02:00 (CEST)
- INSEE/Postal code: 74087 /74130
- ^{1} French Land Register data, which excludes lakes, ponds, glaciers > 1 km^{2} (0.386 sq mi or 247 acres) and river estuaries.

Contamine-sur-Arve (French pronunciation: [kɔ̃tamin syʁ aʁv], literally Contamine on Arve; Savoyard: Kontamna) is a commune in the Haute-Savoie department and Auvergne-Rhône-Alpes region of eastern France.

== Population ==
Historical population
Year	Pop.	±% p.a.
1968	727	—
1975	837	+2.03%
1982	882	+0.75%
1990	1,125	+3.09%
1999	1,343	+1.99%
2007	1,537	+1.70%
2012	1,709	+2.14%
2017	2,083	+4.04%
2023	2,403	+2.41%
Source: INSEE

== See also ==
- Communes of the Haute-Savoie department
