= La Tour, Haute-Savoie =

La Tour La Tœr (Savoyard)
- Commune
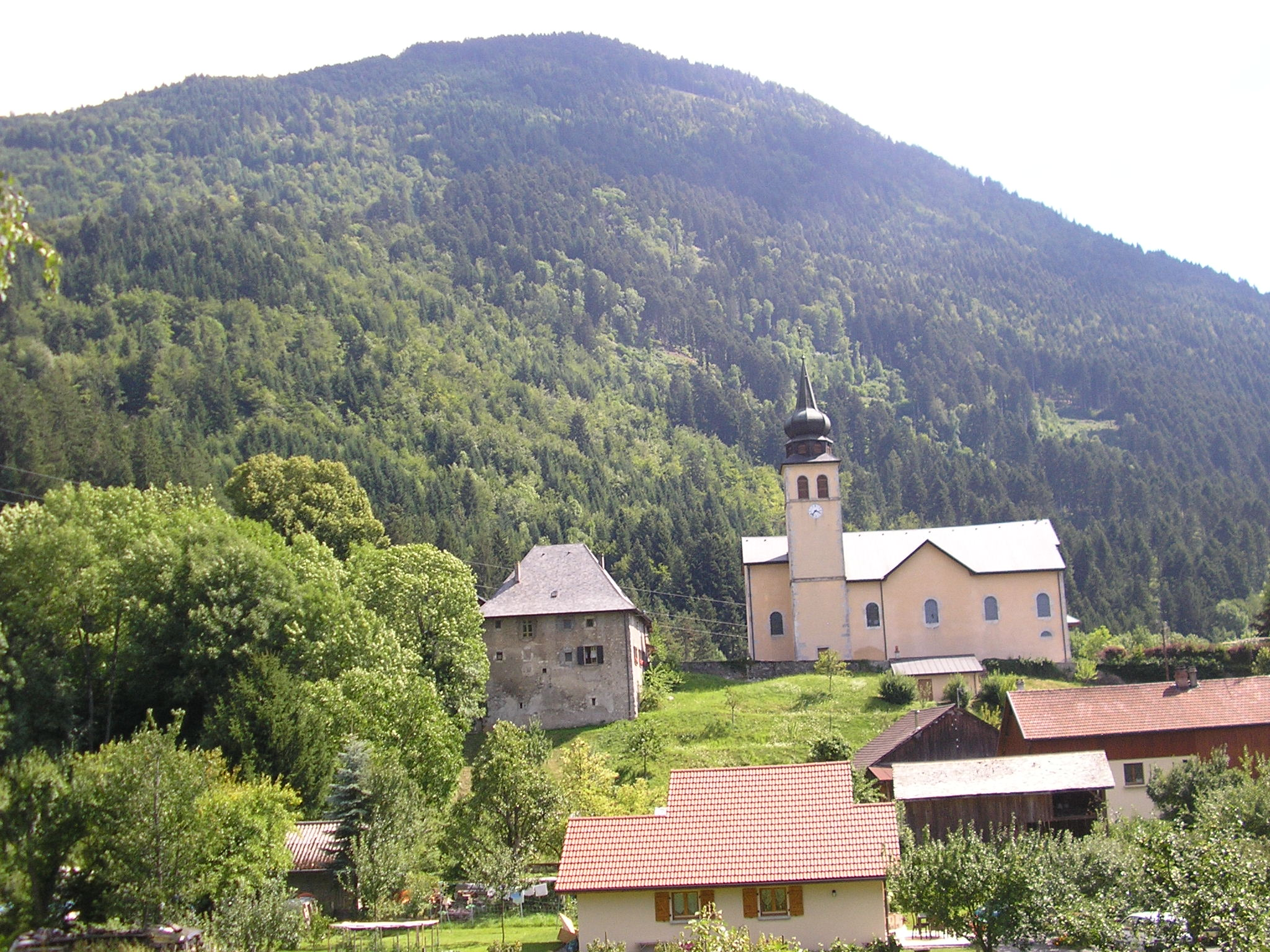
- The church and surrounding buildings in La Tour

- Coat of arms
- Location of La Tour
- Location within France Location within Auvergne-Rhône-Alpes
- Coordinates: 46°08′01″N 6°25′52″E
- Country: France
- Region: Auvergne-Rhône-Alpes
- Department: Haute-Savoie
- Arrondissement: Bonneville
- Canton: Bonneville

Government
  - Mayor (2020–2026): Daniel Revuz
- Area^{1}: 7.73 km^{2} (2.98 sq mi)
- Highest elevation: 1,627 m (5,338 ft)
- Lowest elevation: 588 m (1,929 ft)
- Population (2023): 1,329
  - Density: 172/km^{2} (445/sq mi)
- Time zone: UTC+01:00 (CET)
  - Summer (DST): UTC+02:00 (CEST)
- INSEE/Postal code: 74284 /74250
- ^{1} French Land Register data, which excludes lakes, ponds, glaciers > 1 km^{2} (0.386 sq mi or 247 acres) and river estuaries.

La Tour (Savoyard: La Tœr) is a commune in the Haute-Savoie department in the Auvergne-Rhône-Alpes region in south-eastern France.

== See also ==
- Communes of the Haute-Savoie department
