= Peillonnex =

Peillonnex Pèyené (Savoyard)
- Commune
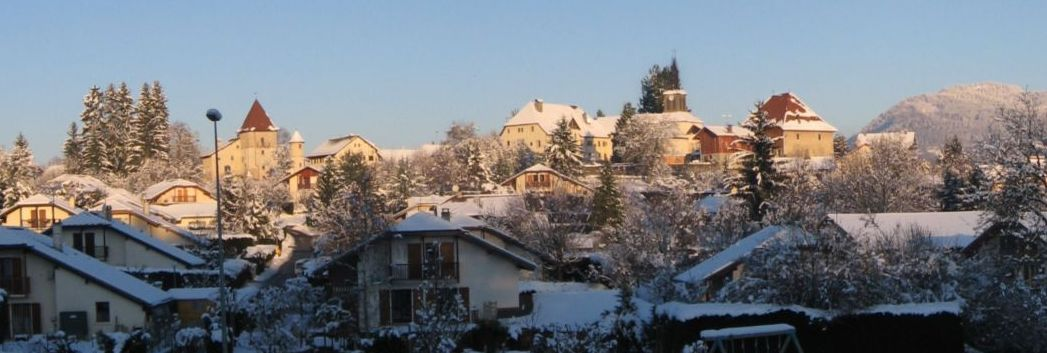
- Peillonnex village seen from the RD12 road

- Coat of arms
- Location of Peillonnex
- Location within France Location within Auvergne-Rhône-Alpes
- Coordinates: 46°07′56″N 6°22′31″E
- Country: France
- Region: Auvergne-Rhône-Alpes
- Department: Haute-Savoie
- Arrondissement: Bonneville
- Canton: Bonneville
- Intercommunality: CC des Quatre Rivières

Government
  - Mayor (2020–2026): Christian Raimbault
- Area^{1}: 6.40 km^{2} (2.47 sq mi)
- Highest elevation: 753 m (2,470 ft)
- Lowest elevation: 565 m (1,854 ft)
- Population (2023): 1,381
  - Density: 216/km^{2} (559/sq mi)
- Time zone: UTC+01:00 (CET)
  - Summer (DST): UTC+02:00 (CEST)
- INSEE/Postal code: 74209 /74250
- Website: www.peillonnex.com
- ^{1} French Land Register data, which excludes lakes, ponds, glaciers > 1 km^{2} (0.386 sq mi or 247 acres) and river estuaries.

Peillonnex (French pronunciation: [pɛjɔne]; Savoyard: Pèyené) is a commune in the Haute-Savoie department and Auvergne-Rhône-Alpes region of south-eastern France. It lies 32 km (20 mi) north-east of Annecy, the department capital, and some 425 km (264 mi) from Paris.

The inhabitants are called Peillonnexois.

== Places and monuments ==
- Stiges du château des sires de Faucigny
- The priory of Peillonnex, whose village has preserved a part.
- The church of Peillonnex, is dated from the twelfth century, it is inscribed in the register of historical monuments. Its architecture combines Romanesque art and Savoyard baroque art. A small walking tour "wandering around the priory" takes a look at the surrounding landscape and the architecture of the church.

== Tourist attractions near Peillonnex ==
=== Grand sites of France ===
- Cirque de Sixt Fer a Cheval (37km) [Map]

=== Villages ===
- Yvoire (27km)
- Sixt-Fer-à-Cheval (32km)

=== National Monuments ===
- Voltaire Chateau (25km) [Map]

=== Recommended detour towns ===
- La Roche-sur-Foron (9km) [Map]
- Sallanches (29km)

=== Regional Natural Parcs ===
- Haut-Jura (48km) [Map]

=== Remarkable gardens ===
- Le Labyrinthe - Jardin des Cinq Sens (27km) [Map]
- Jardin botanique alpin La Jaÿsinia (27km) [Map]
- Jardin d'eau de pré curieux (32km) [Map]

=== Sites of natural beauty ===
- Mole (6km) [Map]
- Cascade de la Diomaz (12km) [Map]
- Col de la Colombière (17km) [Map]
- Col de Romme (19km) [Map]
- Roc d'Enfer (19km) [Map]
- Mont Veyrier (30km) [Map]
- Cascade du Rouget (32km) [Map]
- Lac d'Annecy (34km) [Map]
- Roc de Chere (34km) [Map]
- Lac d'Anterne (36km) [Map]
- Gorges du Fier (37km) [Map]
- Cirque du Fer-à-Cheval (37km) [Map]
- Col de la Faucille (38km) [Map]
- Lac Cornu (41km) [Map]
- Le Brévent (42km) [Map]
- Lac de Lamoura (42km) [Map]
- Glacier des Bossons (47km) [Map]
- Cascade de la queue de cheval (47km) [Map]
- Montenvers (47km) [Map]
- Lac des Rousses (47km) [Map]
- Aiguille du Midi (48km) [Map]
- Mont Blanc (50km) [Map]
- Mer de Glace (50km) [Map]
- Lac de l'Abbaye (57km) [Map]
- Lacs d'Étival (61km) [Map]

=== Towns of art and history ===
- Annecy (32km)

=== Villages in bloom 4* (fr: ville fleurie) ===
- Evian-les-Bains (35km) [Map]
- Megeve (36km)

== See also ==
- Communes of the Haute-Savoie department
