= Faucigny =

Faucigny Feûfnyi (Savoyard) Fosigni (Italian)
- Commune
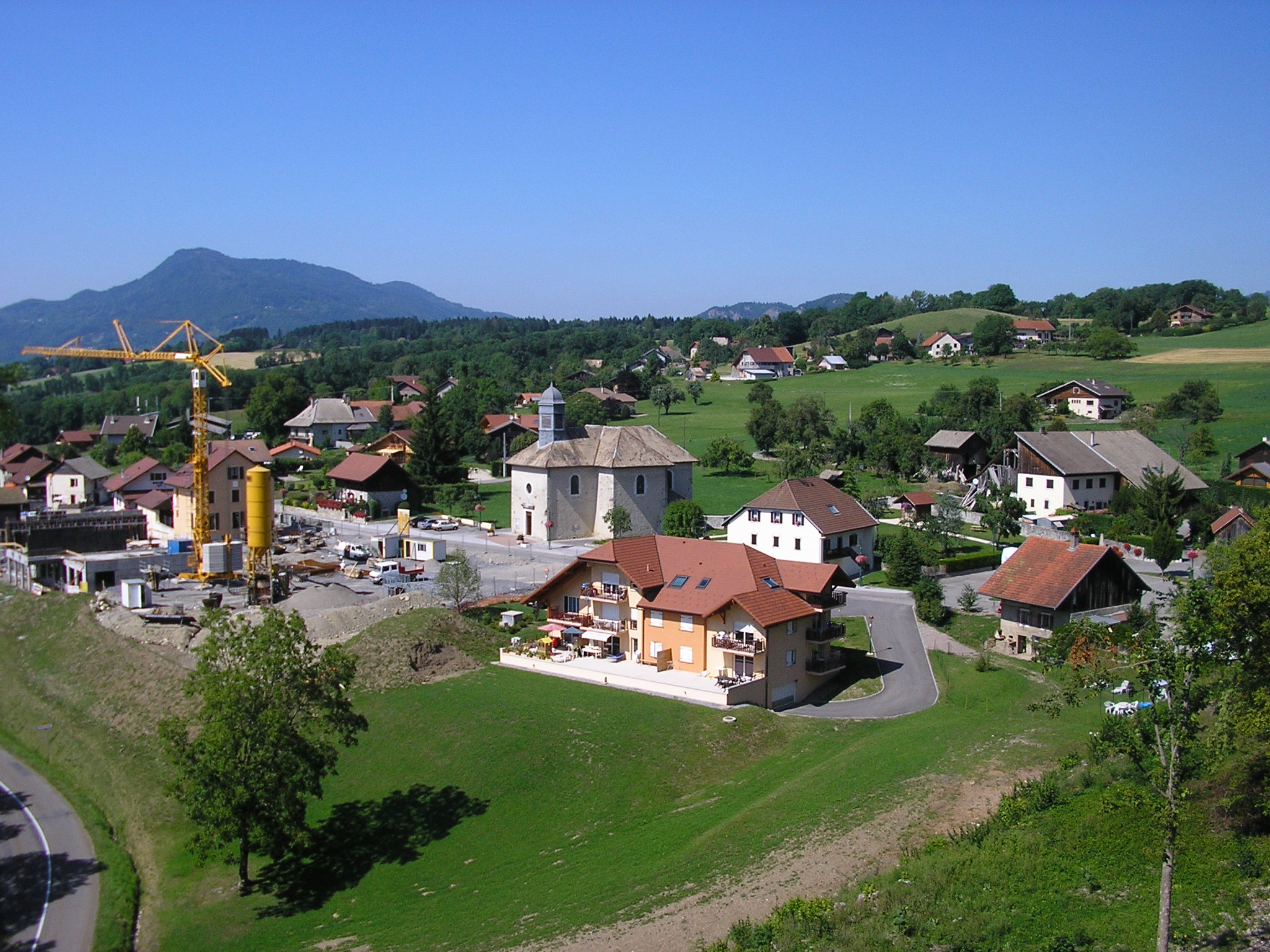
- View of Faucigny from the castle

- Coat of arms
- Location of Faucigny
- Location within France Location within Auvergne-Rhône-Alpes
- Coordinates: 46°07′06″N 6°21′30″E
- Country: France
- Region: Auvergne-Rhône-Alpes
- Department: Haute-Savoie
- Arrondissement: Bonneville
- Canton: Bonneville
- Intercommunality: CC des Quatre Rivières

Government
  - Mayor (2020–2026): Barthélémy Gonzalez-Rodriguez
- Area^{1}: 4.91 km^{2} (1.90 sq mi)
- Highest elevation: 1,002 m (3,287 ft)
- Lowest elevation: 477 m (1,565 ft)
- Population (2023): 684
  - Density: 139/km^{2} (361/sq mi)
- Time zone: UTC+01:00 (CET)
  - Summer (DST): UTC+02:00 (CEST)
- INSEE/Postal code: 74122 /74130
- ^{1} French Land Register data, which excludes lakes, ponds, glaciers > 1 km^{2} (0.386 sq mi or 247 acres) and river estuaries.

Faucigny (French pronunciation: [fosiɲi]; Arpitan: Feûfnyi; Italian: Fosigni) is a commune in the Haute-Savoie department in the Auvergne-Rhône-Alpes region in south-eastern France.

Historically, Faucigny was a region in Savoy which included the area of the modern département of Haute Savoie and the municipalities of Chamonix, Argentière, and Les Houches.

== Geography ==
In the Faucigny region, the river Arve flows through the low-lying, agricultural Arve Valley. The village of Faucigny is at an elevation of approximately 639 m., northeast of La Roche-sur-Foron, and about 20 km. southeast of the city of Geneva. The village lies on a river terrace on the eastern side of the Arve Valley.

== History ==
The fertile valley of the Arve and the area around Faucigny were already settled in Neolithic times, and there are numerous Roman ruins. Legend suggests that the area was the estates of the Roman family Falcinius. It was known by various names in the Middle Ages: Falciniacum, Fociniacum and Fossiniacum, but the first documented name was Fulciniaco.

Around 930 a castle was built on a rocky promontory overlooking the Arve. The castle was the regional governmental seat from the eleventh through the thirteenth centuries. The barons of Faucigny dominated the valley of the Arve and its tributary the Giffre, the Arly as far as Flumet, and the valley of Doron de Beaufort (Beaufortain). During this time, suzerainty over Faucigny was contested between the House of Savoy and the Dauphin de Viennois.

In 1253, Pierre II of Savoy acquired Faucigny by marrying Agnès, the daughter of the Baron de Faucigny. Their daughter, Béatrix, inherited the province in 1268. Béatrix married Guigues VII and the lands came under the Dauphin de Viennois. Savoy fought to regain the Faucigny region, but was unsuccessful and Faucigny became part of France in 1349 as part of the purchase from Humbert II de La Tour du Pin, Dauphin de Viennois of the Dauphiné lands. Amadeus VI, Count of Savoy, challenged this purchase and defeated the French in 1354. Then Faucigny was transferred to the House of Savoy as part of the peace Treaty of Paris (1355).

Recently Faucigny has come up in the news again as twelve cars were burned in riots in 2005.

== Twin towns – sister cities ==
Faucigny is twinned with:

- Camandona, Italy (2011)

== See also ==
- Communes of the Haute-Savoie department
- House of Faucigny
- Château de Faucigny
