= Domancy =

Domancy Domanfi (Savoyard)
- Commune
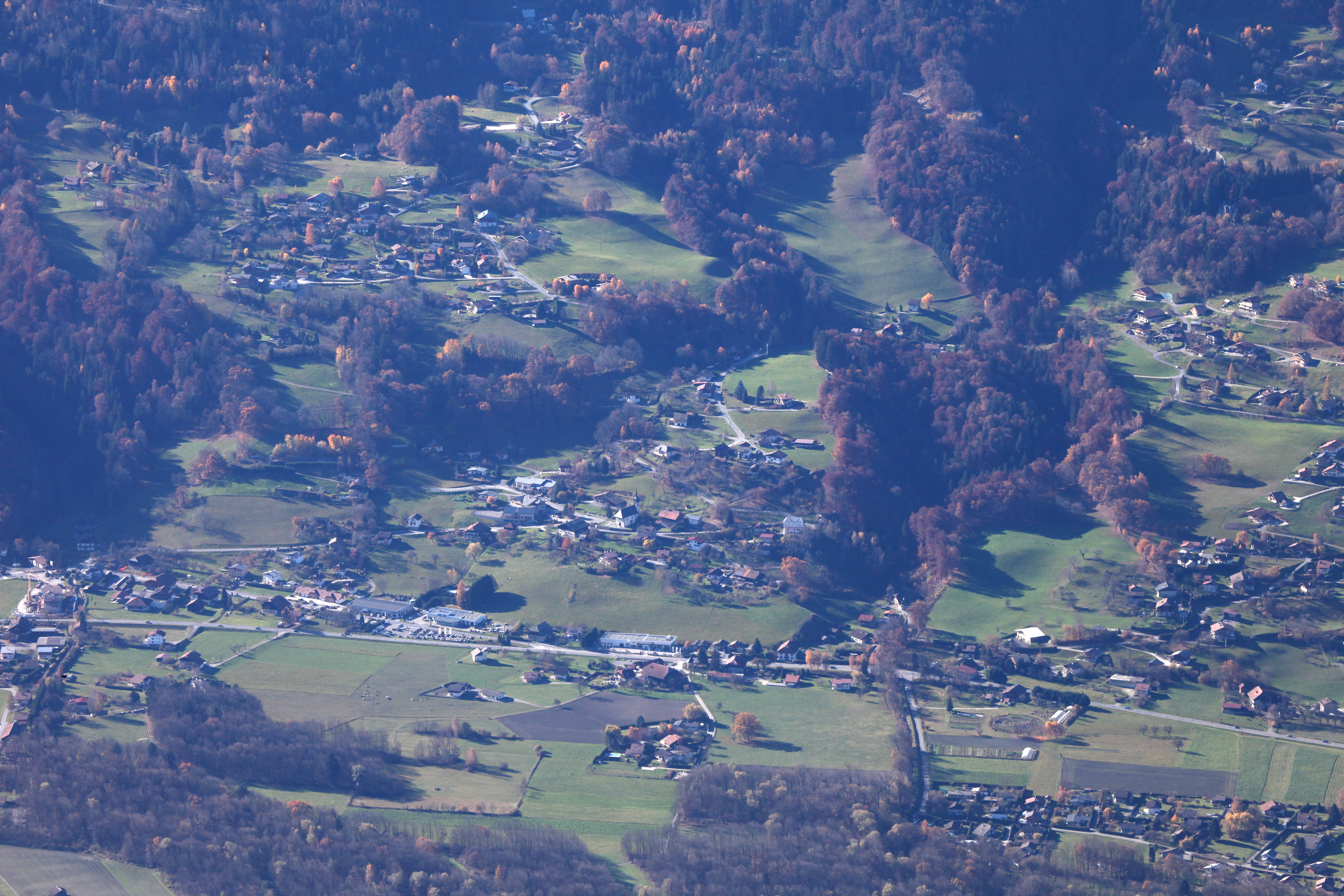

- Coat of arms
- Location of Domancy
- Location within France Location within Auvergne-Rhône-Alpes
- Coordinates: 45°54′52″N 6°38′57″E
- Country: France
- Region: Auvergne-Rhône-Alpes
- Department: Haute-Savoie
- Arrondissement: Bonneville
- Canton: Sallanches
- Intercommunality: Pays du Mont-Blanc

Government
  - Mayor (2020–2026): Serge Revenaz
- Area^{1}: 7.4 km^{2} (2.9 sq mi)
- Highest elevation: 900 m (3,000 ft)
- Lowest elevation: 547 m (1,795 ft)
- Population (2023): 2,097
  - Density: 280/km^{2} (730/sq mi)
- Time zone: UTC+01:00 (CET)
  - Summer (DST): UTC+02:00 (CEST)
- INSEE/Postal code: 74103 /74700
- ^{1} French Land Register data, which excludes lakes, ponds, glaciers > 1 km^{2} (0.386 sq mi or 247 acres) and river estuaries.

Domancy (French pronunciation: [dɔmɑ̃si]; Savoyard: Domanfi) is a commune in the Haute-Savoie department in the Auvergne-Rhône-Alpes region in south-eastern France. It is part of the urban area of Sallanches.

== Population ==
Historical population
Year	Pop.	±% p.a.
1968	977	—
1975	1,033	+0.80%
1982	1,210	+2.29%
1990	1,527	+2.95%
1999	1,710	+1.27%
2007	1,780	+0.50%
2012	1,904	+1.36%
2017	2,113	+2.10%
2023	2,097	−0.13%
Source: INSEE

== See also ==
- Communes of the Haute-Savoie department
