= Canton of Bonneville =

Administrative division of Haute-Savoie, France

Coordinates: 46.08°N 6.41°E

A map of the canton of Bonneville in Haute-Savoie since 2015

The canton of Bonneville (French: Canton de Bonneville) is a canton (an administrative division) in the central part of the Haute-Savoie department in Southeastern France. Its seat is Bonneville. Its borders were modified at the canton reorganisation that came into effect in March 2015. Since then, it elects two members of the Departmental Council of Haute-Savoie.

== Composition ==
The canton of Bonneville consists of the following communes:

1. Arenthon
2. Ayse
3. Bonneville
4. Brizon
5. Contamine-sur-Arve
6. Faucigny
7. Fillinges
8. Glières-Val-de-Borne
9. Marcellaz
10. Marignier
11. Mégevette
12. Onnion
13. Peillonnex
14. Saint-Jean-de-Tholome
15. Saint-Jeoire
16. Saint-Pierre-en-Faucigny
17. La Tour
18. Ville-en-Sallaz
19. Viuz-en-Sallaz
20. Vougy
