= Vougy, Haute-Savoie =

Vougy Veuzhi (Savoyard)
- Commune
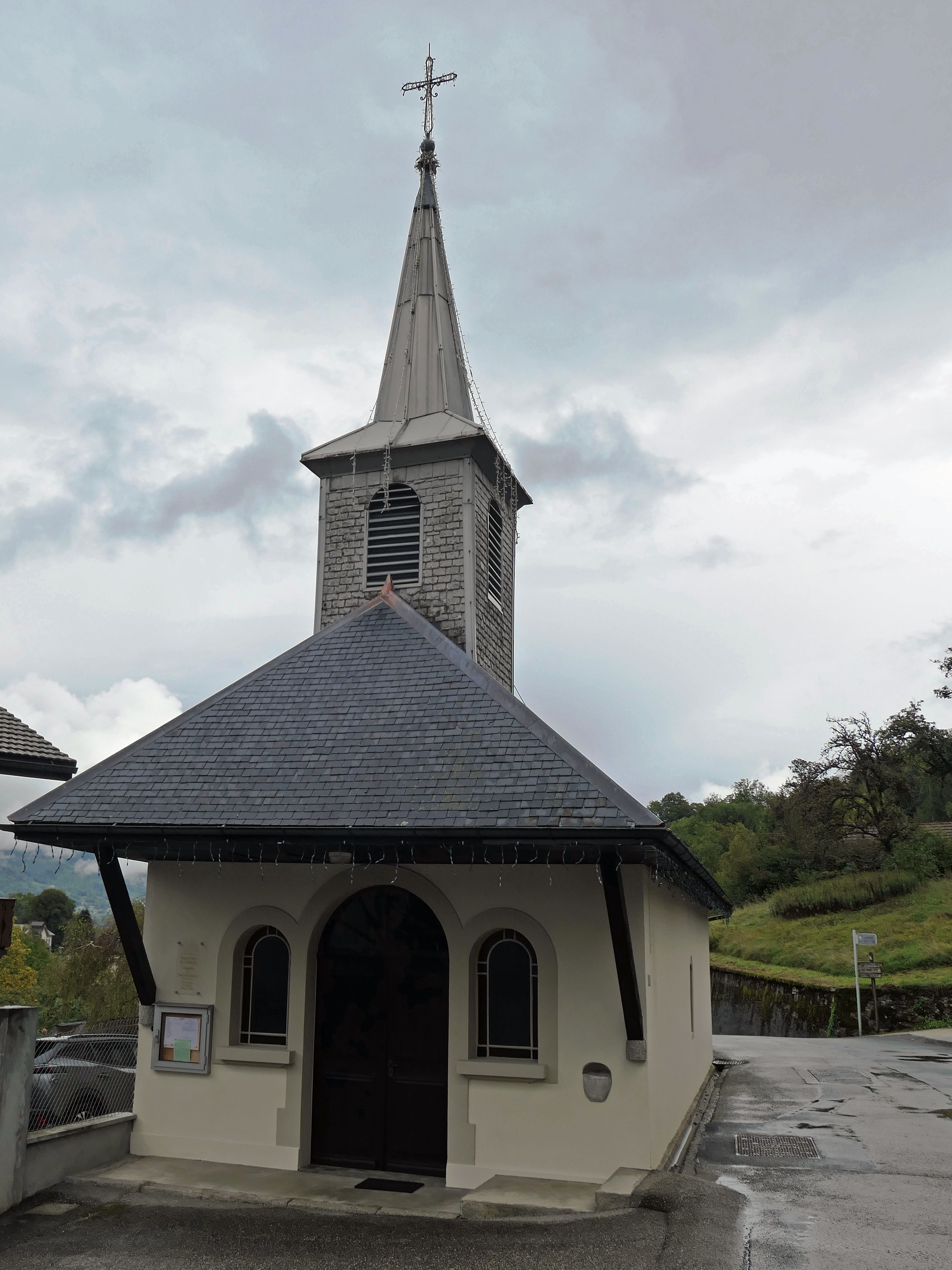
- Location of Vougy
- Location within France Location within Auvergne-Rhône-Alpes
- Coordinates: 46°04′22″N 6°29′36″E
- Country: France
- Region: Auvergne-Rhône-Alpes
- Department: Haute-Savoie
- Arrondissement: Bonneville
- Canton: Bonneville
- Intercommunality: Faucigny-Glières

Government
  - Mayor (2020–2026): Yves Massarotti
- Area^{1}: 3.99 km^{2} (1.54 sq mi)
- Elevation: 465 m (1,526 ft)
- Highest elevation: 800 m (2,600 ft)
- Lowest elevation: 450 m (1,480 ft)
- Population (2023): 1,659
  - Density: 416/km^{2} (1,080/sq mi)
- Time zone: UTC+01:00 (CET)
  - Summer (DST): UTC+02:00 (CEST)
- INSEE/Postal code: 74312 /74130
- ^{1} French Land Register data, which excludes lakes, ponds, glaciers > 1 km^{2} (0.386 sq mi or 247 acres) and river estuaries.

Vougy (French pronunciation: [vuʒi]; Savoyard: Veuzhi) is a commune in the Haute-Savoie department in the Auvergne-Rhône-Alpes region in south-eastern France.

== See also ==
- Communes of the Haute-Savoie department
