= Abbey of Entremont =

Former abbey in France

Sainte-Marie d'Entremont Abbey
- Sanctu Maria inter montes
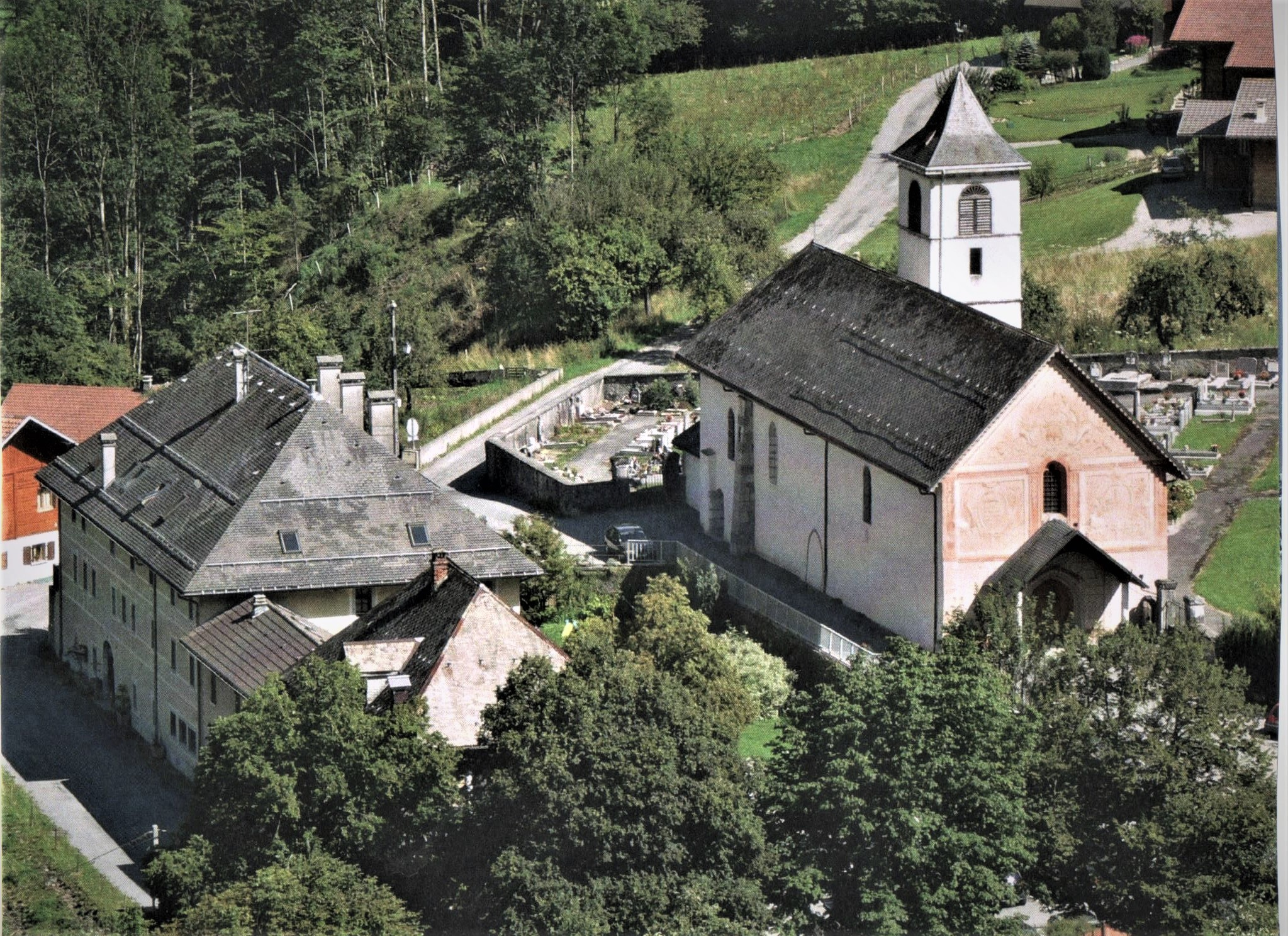

Religion
- Affiliation: Catholic church
- Province: Haute-Savoie
- Region: Auvergne-Rhône-Alpes

Location
- State: Glières-Val-de-Borne
- Country: France
- Interactive map of Sainte-Marie d'Entremont Abbey
- Coordinates: 45°57′24″N 6°23′10″E

The Abbey of Entremont, also known as Entremont-en-Genevois and dedicated to Saint Mary (Sancta Maria inter montes), is a former abbey of Canons Regular founded in 1154. It is situated in the commune of Glières-Val-de-Borne, within the Haute-Savoie department in the Auvergne-Rhône-Alpes region of France.

== Geography ==
The Abbey of Entremont is located on the left bank of the Borne Valley, along departmental road D12, between Saint-Pierre-en-Faucigny and Saint-Jean-de-Sixt. It is situated near the historical border between the territories of Faucigny and the County of Geneva, with the Borne torrent serving as a natural boundary. The abbey's domain extended into the valleys of the Bornant.

== History ==
=== Foundation of the Abbey ===
Around 1115, canons from the Abbey of Abondance, located in the province of Chablais, established a priory in the already-inhabited valley of Entremont. Burcard, who became prior of the monastery, is believed to have been a member of the Counts of Geneva family. The monks received a land donation extending from the strait of Antérieux to the Pas de l’Échelle, corresponding to the parish of Entremont, from a local seigneurial family, possibly the Pontverre. This donation was later confirmed by Count Amadeus I of Geneva, the regional suzerain, in the presence of Peter II of Tarentaise, Archbishop of Tarentaise.

Girold, the first abbot of the Abbey of Entremont, implemented a strict monastic life based on the Rule of Saint Augustine. The constitutions of the Abbey of Abondance, composed around 1130 by the Blessed Ponce de Faucigny, first abbot of Sixt, served as a model. This form of religious life attracted support from the Counts of Geneva and local nobility. The abbey acquired extensive holdings, including forests, water sources, and mountain pastures in areas such as La Forclaz, Mayse, Lessy, and Les Auges, as well as lands in Cenise (Le Petit-Bornand), La Roche-sur-Foron, Grand-Bornand, Pers, Amancy, Groisy, Saint-Laurent, and Thônes. It also owned mills in Cran (near Annecy) and vineyards in Arve-en-Faucigny, Saint-Sigismond, and L’Hôpital-sous-Conflans (now part of Albertville). To protect these assets, the abbey relied on vassals who became influential in the region. Six churches—Amancy, Menthonnex-sous-Clermont, Mésigny, Pers, Poisy, and Rumilly-sous-Cornillon—were under the abbey's jurisdiction and owed it various dues and rents. Despite its possessions, the abbey was subject to financial obligations, including subsidies and taxes payable to the Count of Savoy, the bishop, and the Apostolic Chamber.

Following substantial donations, the priory of Entremont sought and obtained autonomy from the Abbey of Abondance, with the approval of Burcard, then Abbot of Abondance. The Abbey of Entremont was officially established by charter on 12 February 1154, with twelve canons in residence. The abbot of Entremont was accorded precedence in rank after the abbots of Abondance and Sixt. In 1160, a papal bull issued by Pope Alexander III placed the abbey and its dependencies under papal protection.

Abbot Girold gained significant recognition and, in 1161, was called to witness the signing of a "charter of charity" between the abbeys of Sixt and Abondance, under the influence of Peter II of Tarentaise, Archbishop of Tarentaise and former abbot of Tamié Abbey. In 1180, Girold was appointed abbot of Abondance, his original monastery. His successor, Jacques (1184–1188), was also held in high regard and contributed to the resolution of a dispute between William I of Geneva and Bishop Arducius of Faucigny. Between 1175 and 1250, the canons of Entremont established a hospital intended to serve both clergy and laypeople. Founded "to the praise of God," its purpose was to care for the destitute, poor, and sick. The hospital welcomed not only local inhabitants but also travelers. Treatment methods were primarily based on prayer and the use of medicinal plants, either collected in the surrounding mountains or cultivated in the abbey's gardens.

In 1225, Count William II of Geneva granted the Abbey of Entremont the status of a seigneury, conferring upon the abbot the title of Lord of Entremont. At that time, the abbey's domain encompassed approximately 1,835 hectares. It held the patronage of the parishes of Amancy, Pers, Poisy, Menthonnex-sous-Clermont, Mésigny, and Saint-Pierre-de-Cornillon. Additional possessions included land near La Roche-sur-Foron, Grand-Bornand, and Boëge, as well as mills in Cran and vineyards in Saint-Sigismond and L’Hôpital-sous-Conflans. From its foundation, the abbey church also served as a parish church. This dual function is confirmed by a pastoral visitation in 1445, which stated: “Et propter hec (visitador) visitationi abbatie supersedit, et solum de pressenti ad visitionem ecclesie parrochialis que in ipso monasterio extradur [...]” (“And for this reason [the visitor] omitted the visitation of the abbey and attended only the parish church, which was located in the monastery”).

=== Influence on the Borne Valley ===
From its foundation, the Abbey of Entremont engaged in land clearing and deforestation to expand its holdings, with the support of allies and vassals. The lords of Clets contributed by granting land to the congregation. These efforts aimed to secure the abbey's material sustenance and reinforce its religious and social influence, including the spiritual benefit of its lay benefactors.

The abbey played a significant role in the development of local settlement and subsistence agriculture. Its organized land management contrasted with the less systematic clearing efforts of the local population. The monastic community was responsible for developing areas such as Bois-Berchet and the southern slope of the Bouchet Valley, including Nant-Robert, Les Poches, La Vandanche, and Les Plans. In the valley floors, they cultivated Lormay and Les Troncs, while in the Chinaillon Valley, development occurred around Les Faux, Combe des Mouilles, and the hamlet of Chinaillon. Further upslope, in the area of Maroly, the abbey's territory bordered that of the Charterhouse of Le Reposoir.

Under the feudal system, distinctions were made between rights over servile lands, though both ecclesiastical institutions and secular lords often exercised overlapping claims over individuals, sometimes extending beyond their fiefs. This situation resulted in complex territorial arrangements. For example, the Bouchet Valley (present-day Le Grand-Bornand) was simultaneously under the authority of various feudal lords, the Count of Geneva, the Charterhouse of Le Reposoir, and the Abbey of Entremont. Around 1160, the abbey's scribes referred to the "land of Bornan" as encompassing the entire Borne Valley without subdivision. By approximately 1260, distinctions had emerged: the lower section, known as "Petit Bornand," extended from the Evaux pass to the entrance of the Étroits pass, while the upper section was designated "Grand Bornand." A 1266 inventory records a donation of 15 sols to a priest named Pierre, identified as being from "Maggior Bornando."

=== Land extend ===
Over thirty notarial acts issued under the authority of the abbots of Entremont between 1220 and 1450 attest to the abbey's presence in the upper Borne Valley. One such act, dated 1266, involved the canons of Entremont and a resident of La Mulaterie (in present-day Le Grand-Bornand), with Hubert of Clets, local lord, serving as a witness. The abbey held property and vassals in the area of Nant Robert. The principal access route to the Bouchet and Chinaillon valleys passed through the Borne Valley via the La Forclaz pass. In 1347, the abbot of Entremont and the lord of Clets, in the presence of the procurator of La Forclaz, signed an agreement defining territorial boundaries and confirming that local inhabitants were subject to the abbey's taxation and judicial authority. The overlapping jurisdictions of the abbey and the lords of Clets led to frequent disputes. In 1386, Albert of Clets formally recognized the abbey's full jurisdiction. This authority had previously been granted to the Clets family by the Count of Geneva on 15 April 1334.

=== Demographic upheaval ===
Around 1361, the Black Death reached the Borne Valley, followed by another epidemic in 1418 that resulted in approximately 240 deaths. According to Canon François Pochat-Baron (1860–1951), author of a Histoire des paroisses de la vallée de Thônes, the epidemic returned in 1571. In 1380, the territory of Maggior Bornando recorded 40 hearths, corresponding to roughly 240 inhabitants. By 1411, this number had risen to 80 hearths; in 1442, a year for which tax records exist, 104 hearths (approximately 624 people) were recorded; in 1481, 140 hearths (about 820 people); and in 1561, the salt tax accounted for 1,392 inhabitants in Grand-Bornand. To maintain feudal revenues, repopulation efforts were undertaken. The Count of Geneva instructed his vassals either to bring serfs from other holdings or to attract free settlers by offering land and homesteads.

=== Submission to Saint-Ruph of Valence ===
In 1279, Robert of Geneva, Bishop of Geneva and Canon of Vienne, reported significant irregularities at the Abbey of Entremont, including a decline in adherence to the Rule of Saint Augustine and inadequate maintenance of the buildings. On 8 November of that year, he removed the abbey from the jurisdiction of the Abbot of Abondance and placed it under the authority of the Abbey of Saint-Ruf (Saint-Ruph) in Valence. From that point forward, the Abbot of Saint-Ruf held the right to elect the Abbot of Entremont, subject to approval by the Bishop of Geneva. Many abbots during the 14th and 15th centuries were drawn from the local nobility, including members of the de Verboux family.

In 1281, Anselme became the first abbot of Entremont from the Congregation of Saint-Ruph. He introduced twelve canons reputed for their discipline, contributing to the restoration of monastic order. His successors focused on the abbey's material consolidation. Abbot Aymar (1292–1302) worked to secure the abbey's rights and revenues through the enforcement of feudal obligations, acquisition of annuities and rents, and the negotiation of territorial exchanges. One such exchange transferred the lordship of Petit-Bornand to the abbey in return for relinquishing that of Pers to Count Amadeus II of Geneva. In 1292, Amadeus confirmed the abbey's titles, properties, and rights, and made additional donations in 1303. These grants were reaffirmed in a charter dated July 7, 1340, signed by Hugues of Geneva, confirming the abbey's lordships, rights, and jurisdictions.

=== Challenging times ===
During this period, monetary circulation was limited, and transactions were commonly conducted through the exchange of goods or land rather than currency. Broader political and religious developments included the suppression of the Knights Templar and the confiscation of their assets by Philip IV of France, ongoing conflicts among feudal lords, and the relocation of the papacy to Avignon. At the Abbey of Entremont, five abbots held office in succession, each with varying degrees of authority. In response to renewed internal disorder and a decline in discipline, Falcon de Montchenu, Prior of Poisy, was granted full powers and legal authority on 12 May 1330 by the Abbot of Saint-Ruph to oversee all affairs under Entremont's jurisdiction.

In 1341 and 1342, a series of loans—possibly prompted by a fire—placed the Abbey of Entremont in financial difficulty. Abbot Guilfred Orselli acknowledged debts to Lombard bankers and sought to address the situation by reasserting neglected feudal rights. His successor, Lambert de la Garde (1349–1358), was unable to repay the obligations and turned to the abbey's noble feudatories for support. These vassals collectively agreed to guarantee the abbot's debts using their persons, properties, and reputations, committing to a total payment of 400 florins. The abbey's feudatories at the time included Henri d’Amancy the Elder, Henri d’Amancy the Younger, Pierre de Pouget, Hugues de la Balme, Pierre Gassy of Escans, Aymonet de Gemma, Girard de Bez, Rollet de Biolley, Jean de Lamollaz, Perrot de Chatellard, Jean du Foron (of Chamouny), Rolet Plipicet of Rumilly (under Cornillon), and Henri de Coendier (or Cohendier).

The extensive documentation from the prelature of Abbot Jean de Fillinges (1336–1380) indicates that the Abbey of Entremont was frequently required to defend its rights and possessions. Religious communities during this period often experienced losses due to administrative negligence. In response to these challenges, several popes recommended that the Abbot of Saint-Ruph employ excommunication as a means to recover property that had been usurped or unlawfully alienated.

=== The Abbots of Verboux ===
At the beginning of the 15th century, the region of Genevois came under the authority of Duke Amadeus VIII of Savoy (1383–1451). From 1395 to 1462, the abbacy of Entremont was held successively by members of the Verboux family, passed from uncle to nephew. This noble family maintained alliances with several leading houses of Savoy. On 21 August 1411, Bishop Jean de Bertrand described Abbot Jacques de Verboux (1395–1412) as a figure of notable virtue and affirmed that both the convent and the pastors of its dependent parishes were in good standing. During his tenure, conflicts over the secular rights of the abbey were less frequent compared to previous administrations, except for a dispute with the inhabitants of Petit-Bornand over alpine pastures in the mountain of Cenise, which was resolved in 1405.

As early as 1408, under the direction of Jacques de Verboux, the canons organized charity confraternities. The Holy Spirit confraternity functioned as a Christian mutual aid association providing material assistance to the poor, supported by donations and bequests. The religious community promoted this effort through a life of apostolate, prayer, mortification, and almsgiving. Pierre de Verboux (1412–1426) sought to maintain the abbey's independence from Jean de Bertrand, Bishop of Geneva, and from the Abbot of Saint-Ruph, initiating legal proceedings. During his tenure, disputes over the Cenise pastures (Petit-Bornand) resumed with the inhabitants of Mont-Saxonnex. His prelature also marked the union of the priory of Poisy with the abbey. The fiefs of both institutions were interwoven in Poisy, although both remained under the authority of Saint-Ruph.

A fire destroyed a significant portion of the abbey, necessitating the reconstruction of its buildings despite limited resources. In response, Pierre de Verboux requested the union of the priory of Poisy with Entremont, which was approved by Pope Martin V in 1426. Jean de Verboux (1430–1462) maintained the confidence of Count Amadeus VIII of Savoy, whom he supported during his elevation to the papacy as Felix V. During his tenure, he defended the rights of the monastery, as documented in archival sources. The inhabitants of Mont-Saxonnex ("Les du Mont") engaged in acts of violence that resulted in significant damage to the abbey.

The Count of Genevois resolved the ongoing dispute over Cenise by confirming that the lands belonged to the abbot and his successors “according to their ancient rights of direct domain and full jurisdiction.” In 1468, Janus of Savoy granted the abbey ownership of the mountain of Cenise (above Petit-Bornand), along with Planex, the combe of Biolland (in the Bargy range), and Tumelley (in the commune of Saint-Laurent).

The will of Jean de Verboux provides insight into the ceremonial practices of the period. He requested that 120 priests celebrate Mass at his funeral, accompanied by 40 torchbearers, each carrying a golden florin. On the day of the burial, thirteen poor men were to be clothed in locally produced white cloth, and a meal consisting of bread, wine, meat, soup, and a monetary gift of three Genevan deniers was to be provided to those in attendance. During the Novena, eight priests were to officiate each evening. It also included donations to clergy, chapels, family members, his clerk, and servant. Antoine des Clets (1462–1472) was the last regular abbot of Saint-Ruph. Mamert Fichet, a native of Petit-Bornand and brother of Guillaume Fichet, served as Bishop of Hebron and representative of the Bishop of Geneva. He conducted a pastoral visitation in 1470 and produced a report on the abbey's condition the following year.

=== From Commendation to the Modern Era ===
Commendatory abbots, appointed by the reigning prince, were not members of the Canons Regular of Saint-Ruph and were not obligated to observe monastic life. Their position did not require residence at the Abbey of Entremont or adherence to the Rule of Saint Augustine. They typically visited the monastery only to take formal possession and to receive revenues managed by their deputies. The first commendatory abbot was Philippe de Luxembourg (1486–1519), who was appointed cardinal by Pope Alexander VI and served as his legate. To increase his income, he reduced the number of canons at Entremont to six with limited prebends, and the number of canons at Poisy to three.

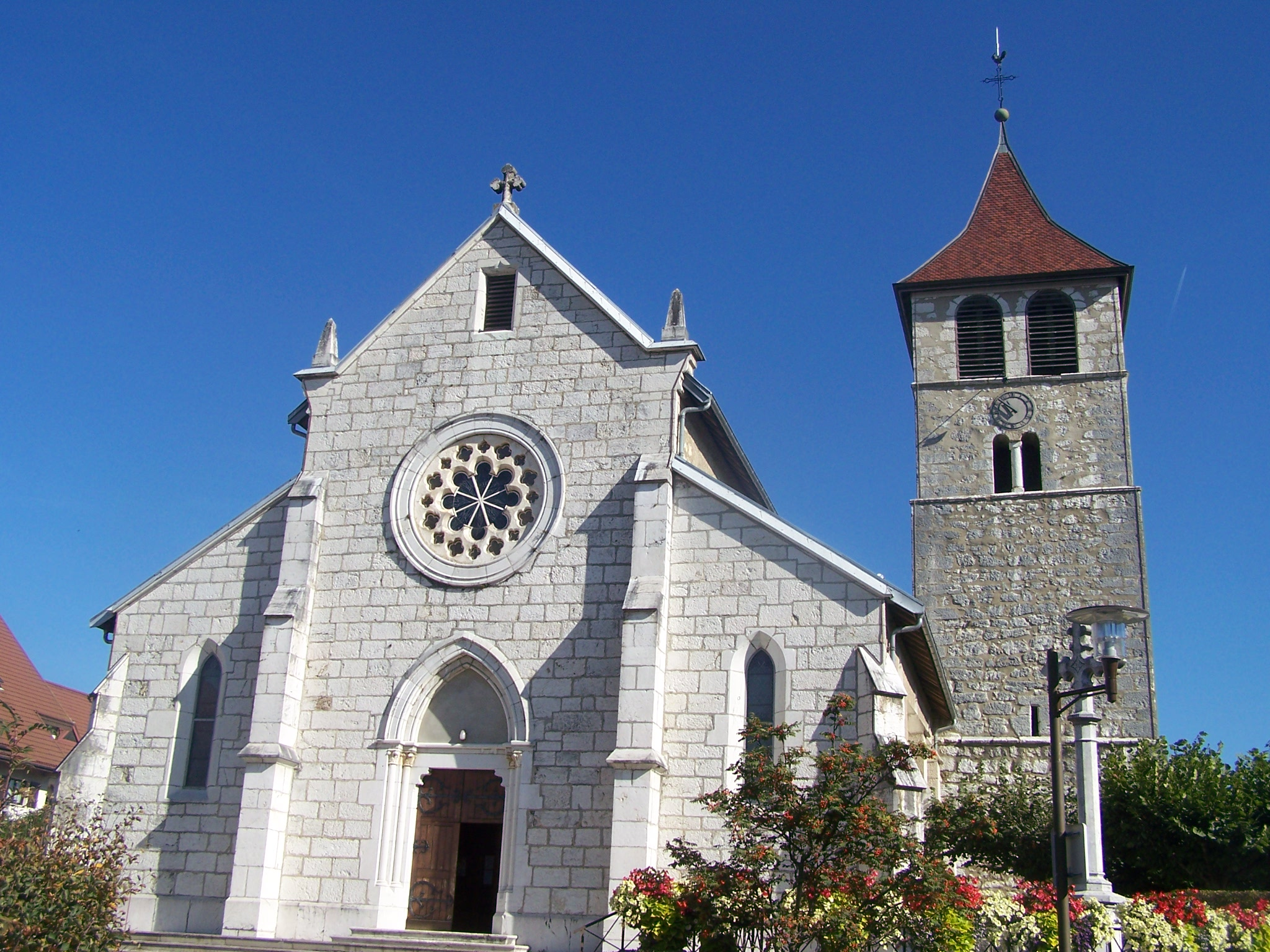
The Poisy church today.

Following the brief prelature of two abbots, the commendatory abbacy was assigned to Jacques, known as “of Savoy,” the natural son of Philippe of Savoy-Nemours, who was primarily interested in its revenues. During this period, the Duchy of Savoy was occupied by the forces and administration of Francis I of France. The occupation, which lasted twenty-two years, was relatively well tolerated within the apanage of the Dukes of Savoy-Nemours, based in Annecy.

In 1543, the chapter of Entremont reduced the share of income, tithes, and donations allocated to the canons of Poisy, leading to a decade-long dispute. This period coincided with the rise of the Reformation: Bernese Protestants entered the Chablais, Geneva became a center of Protestantism, and the Bishop of Geneva went into exile in Annecy. Under the rule of Henry II of France, the abbey fell under the commendation of a French dignitary. Cardinal Jean du Bellay, who held various bishoprics including Bayonne and Paris, served as commendatory abbot from 1557 to 1559. He did not visit Entremont, residing instead in Rome, where he was assisted by his nephew, Joachim du Bellay, a member of the Pléiade literary group. The abbey's administration was overseen by Janus de Regard, a canon of Geneva.

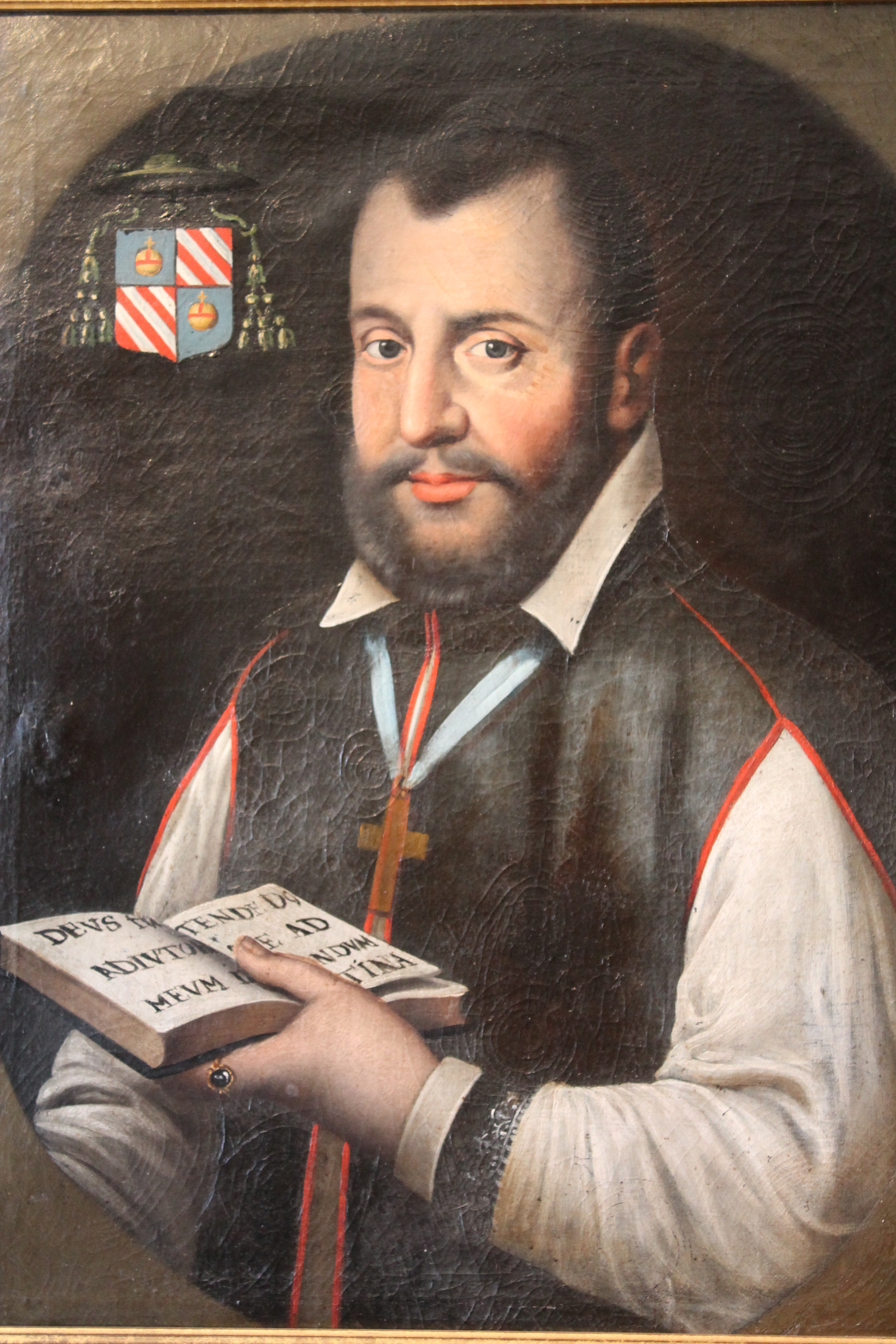
Portrait of Galeazzo Gegald (Regardus).

In 1560, Gallois de Regard succeeded Jean du Bellay as commendatory abbot. A canon of Saint-Pierre Cathedral in Geneva, he later served as chamberlain to Pope Paul IV, who appointed him Bishop of Bagnoréa (present-day Bagnoregio). After returning to Savoy, he commissioned the construction of the Château de Clermont. He died in Annecy in 1582.

=== Saint Francis de Sales ===
After the death of Gallois de Regard, the commendam briefly passed to an illegitimate member of the House of Savoy who did not receive Holy Orders. He was succeeded by Thomas Pobel, a Savoyard cleric who served as commendatory abbot from 1595 to 1605. The son of the first president of the Senate of Savoy and originally from Bonneville, Pobel later became Bishop of Saint-Paul-Trois-Châteaux. Following his episcopal appointment, he participated in the consecration of Francis de Sales at Thorens on 8 December 1602. In agreement with Francis de Sales, Pobel sought to alleviate feudal obligations for the abbey's subjects. He obtained authorization from Pope Clement VIII to release the vassals and subjects of Entremont and Peillonnex from certain forms of servitude. This period was characterized by the religious influence of Francis de Sales. The Savoy-Nemours maintained a position of neutrality despite the military presence of Henry IV and regional tensions involving Geneva.

On 8 October 1607, Francis de Sales visited Entremont and blessed a bell bearing the name of Thomas Pobel. The visit continued through Le Grand-Bornand and Saint-Jean-de-Sixt, where he also blessed a chapel built at the birthplace of Pierre Favre, the first priest of the Society of Jesus, located at "Le Villaret" on the road between Entremont and Le Grand-Bornand. According to the minutes of this pastoral visit, the commendatory abbot at the time was Pierre de Roncas, then eleven years old and appointed for two years. The claustral prior was Reverend Pernet-Mermet of Le Grand-Bornand; the sacristan was Reverend Thomé, also serving as parish priest of Entremont. The community consisted of three canons—Burnet, Gay, and Levet—and three novices.

=== The restoring Abbot: Marc-Antoine de Granery ===
Don Marc-Antoine de Granery (1645–1703), from Piedmont and a member of the Granery family, Marquises of La Roche-sur-Foron, was appointed commendatory abbot of Entremont. He was the son of Count Gaspard Graneri, Minister of Finance of the House of Savoy and First President of the Chamber of Accounts, and the brother of Thomas, the first Marquis of La Roche. He also served as First Almoner to Madame Royale of Savoy. Unlike his predecessors, Granery resided at the abbey and was noted for his piety, charitable actions, and efforts to restore and embellish the church and monastic buildings. He reestablished order and financial stability, though his tenure included legal disputes with individuals, a tax collector, the parish priest of Pers, the canons of Notre-Dame of Annecy, and the Bernardine nuns of La Roche. Restoration work on the convent and church began in 1680, was completed in 1682, and the church altarpiece was finished in 1685.

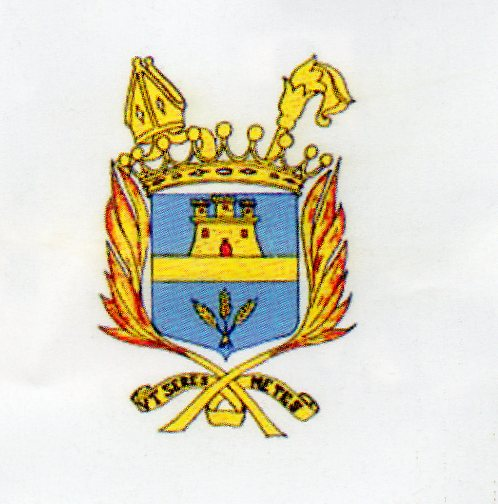
Coat of arms of Marc-Antoine de Granery.

The Granery coat of arms appears inside and outside the abbey. An inscription on the presbytery wall, facing the Borne River, states that the abbot restored the buildings using his funds. Two architects from Biella, Italy, oversaw the project. His precise administration contributed to the abbey's intellectual development. The Granery library, documented in an inventory, contained numerous historical works, reflecting his wide-ranging knowledge.

Marc-Antoine de Granery's coat of arms is described as: “Azure, a fess between three towers in chief and three uprooted ears of wheat in base, all Or,” accompanied by the motto Ut seres metes ("As you sow, so shall you reap"). It features a crenellated castle with three towers above three ears of wheat, topped with a ducal crown, abbatial crozier, mitre, and the motto. The village of Entremont later adopted this coat of arms as its own.

=== An assessment before the end ===
The abbatial seat at Entremont remained vacant from 1703 to 1728. During this period, the canons resumed efforts to establish primary education through the creation of "small schools" in Entremont. On 10 September 1703, a chapter meeting was held under the presidency of Prior Jean-Claude Dupont. Canon François Levet, sacristan and parish priest of Entremont, proposed the appointment of a seventh canon to oversee education in Entremont and the hamlet of La Ville (part of Petit-Bornand). He offered 6,089 florins and a building he had constructed near the convent to serve as a classroom. Following the eventual dissolution of the abbey, the bishop retained the right to appoint the Vicar-Rector, and a lay schoolteacher was later designated.

In 1709, while the Duchy of Savoy remained under occupation, the council of Louis XIV appointed Abbot Carpinel to the commendam of both Entremont and Poisy. At the same time, the canons submitted a petition to the king, requesting a reduction in the income allotted to the commendatory abbots and a one-time payment of two thousand écus from funds held in arrears. Despite this request, the abbey remained heavily taxed and was required to pay 21,753 florins to the occupying authorities.

In 1728, following a prolonged vacancy, Jean-Louis Piochet de Salins, dean of the Sainte-Chapelle in Chambéry, was appointed abbot of Entremont and took up residence there. According to the Mappe Sarde of 1730, the abbey's holdings in Entremont included a house, two mills, a hemp beater, and 300 journaux of land (a journal being approximately one-third of a hectare). The abbey complex consisted of a tower with a wooden shingle (tavaillons) roof, a garden, a courtyard, the church, two barns, and an additional 112 journaux of land. The canons held four chapels, while the parish priest possessed a barn and ten plots of meadows and fields totaling seven journaux. Other possessions included the Auges Mountain (Entremont), granted in albergement in 1433 with an annual rent (auciège) of two and a half quintals of cheese; the mountain of Lessy (Petit-Bornand), leased in 1569 for seven and a half quintals of cheese; and a mill located at Cran, near Annecy.

=== Disappearance ===
After a fourteen-year vacancy, Louis de Montfalcon became the final abbot of Entremont. The king allocated 621 livres for the demolition of the abbey's old bell tower and its reconstruction as a five-story structure, requiring 200 sheets of tinplate for roofing. The total cost amounted to 5,897 livres. Abbot Montfalcon compiled an inventory of the abbey's assets and submitted it to Turin. At that time, only the parish priest and a secular cleric remained at Poisy following the deaths of two canons. In Entremont, the prior claustral had also died in previous years, leaving five canons, including the parish priest. Beginning in 1738, the canons ceased the communal recitation of the Divine Office.

In 1772, the Duke of Savoy issued edicts granting emancipation to the communities of Entremont and Petit-Bornand. These communities convened general councils to designate representatives tasked with implementing the abolition of feudal obligations. The redemption amounts were set at 6,500 livres for Entremont, 12,000 livres for Petit-Bornand, and 1,000 livres for Grand-Bornand. The measure was met with skepticism rather than enthusiasm. Victor Amadeus III, Duke of Savoy and King of Sicily, is reported to have remarked: “These Savoyards—if the Good Lord rained sequins upon them, they would complain that they break the roof tiles.”

For over fourteen years, the canons of Entremont requested secularization and a return to the status of secular clergy. Pope Clement XIV authorized the secularization of the abbey in 1772. The institution was officially dissolved in 1776, along with the priory of Poisy, which was under its jurisdiction. The assets and revenues of the abbey were transferred to the bishops for the maintenance of seminaries, hospitals, and parish churches. Monseigneur Biord, Bishop of Annecy, oversaw the implementation of secularization, which resulted in a contribution of 3,500 livres to the cathedral of Annecy. Despite the dissolution, Abbot Claude Maistre remained parish priest of Entremont until the annexation of the Duchy of Savoy by French revolutionary forces in 1792.

By 1863, architectural elements such as arches, coats of arms, and other remnants near the church still testified to the former significance of the site. A portion of the abbey was preserved and repurposed; until the late 19th century, it served as a presbytery, town hall, and school. In the present day, it houses residential apartments and the Priory Museum.

Between 2016 and 2018, restoration work was undertaken by volunteers from the association Medieval history and architecture workshops.

== Abbots of Entremont ==
The abbey was governed by an abbot. A list of the abbots of Entremont was compiled by Louis-Étienne Piccard (1853–1935) in his article L’abbaye d’Entremont (1895), based in part on a critical review of the work of Joseph-Antoine Besson (1759).

List of Abbots
- 1154 – 1180: Girold, Gérold, or Girard, former canon of Abondance
- 1184 – 1188: Jacques
- 1200: Aydanirus
- 1214: Jacques (probably the same as the previous one, according to Besson)
- 1214 – 1222: Guichard, also known as Richard de Brion or Briore (according to Besson)
- 1225: Jacques
- 1230: Aymar
- 1249: Lambert
- 1252 – 1256: Guifred
- 1262 – 1279: Pierre de la Tour, probably from a family of Faucigny
- 1281: Anselme
- 1282 – 1286: Aymar
- 1287: Guigue
- 1292 – 1302: Aimar
- 1302: Guiffred Orselli
- 1303 – 1305: Bertrand de Mont-Morand (de Monte Morano, called de Montmerant or de Montverant by Besson)
- 1307 – 1319: Amédée de Bressieux
- 1320 – 1322: Guiffred/Guichard de Briore
- 1328 – 1331: Étienne
- 1331: Aymar, Aldemar, also known as Albert de Marmay or de Murmay
- 1331: Jacques
- 1336 – 1349: Guiffred Orselli
- 1349 – 1358: Lambert de la Garde
- 1362 – 1365: Bertrand d’Orose
- 1366 – 1380: Jean de Fillinges
- 1382 – 1387: Ponce, also known as Pierre de Raymond
- 1395 – 1412: Jacques de Verbouz
- 1412 – 1426: Pierre de Verbouz
- 1430 – 1462: Jean, also known as Jacques de Verbouz
- 1462 – 1472: Antoine des Clets

Commendatory Abbots

- 1486 – 1519: Philippe de Luxembourg
- 1525 – 1531: Laurent Berthol, also known as de Barthelome
- 1534: Léonard de Tornabone
- 1543 – (?): Jacques I, known as de Savoie, natural son of Count and Duke Philippe de Savoie-Nemours
- (?) – 1550 (?): Philippe de La Chambre
- 1554 – 1556: Thomas de Bonet
- 1557 – 1559: Jean du Bellay or de Bellay
- 1560 – 1582: Gallois de Regard, Bishop of Bagneroy
- 1585 – 1595: Jacques II, known as de Savoie, natural son of Count and Duke Jacques de Savoie-Nemours
- 1595 – 1605: Thomas Pobel
- 1634 – 1644: Silvio de Savoie, from the House of Savoy
- 1645 – 1703: Marc-Antoine (de) Graneri/Granery

Abbey Seat Vacant (1703–1728)

- 1703: Jean-Claude Dupont, claustral prior
- 1728 – 1740: Jean-Louis de Piochet de Salins, abbot in spiritualibus et temporabilus
- 1754 – 1755: Louis de Montfalcon

Suppression and Secularization of the Abbey.

== Description and architecture ==
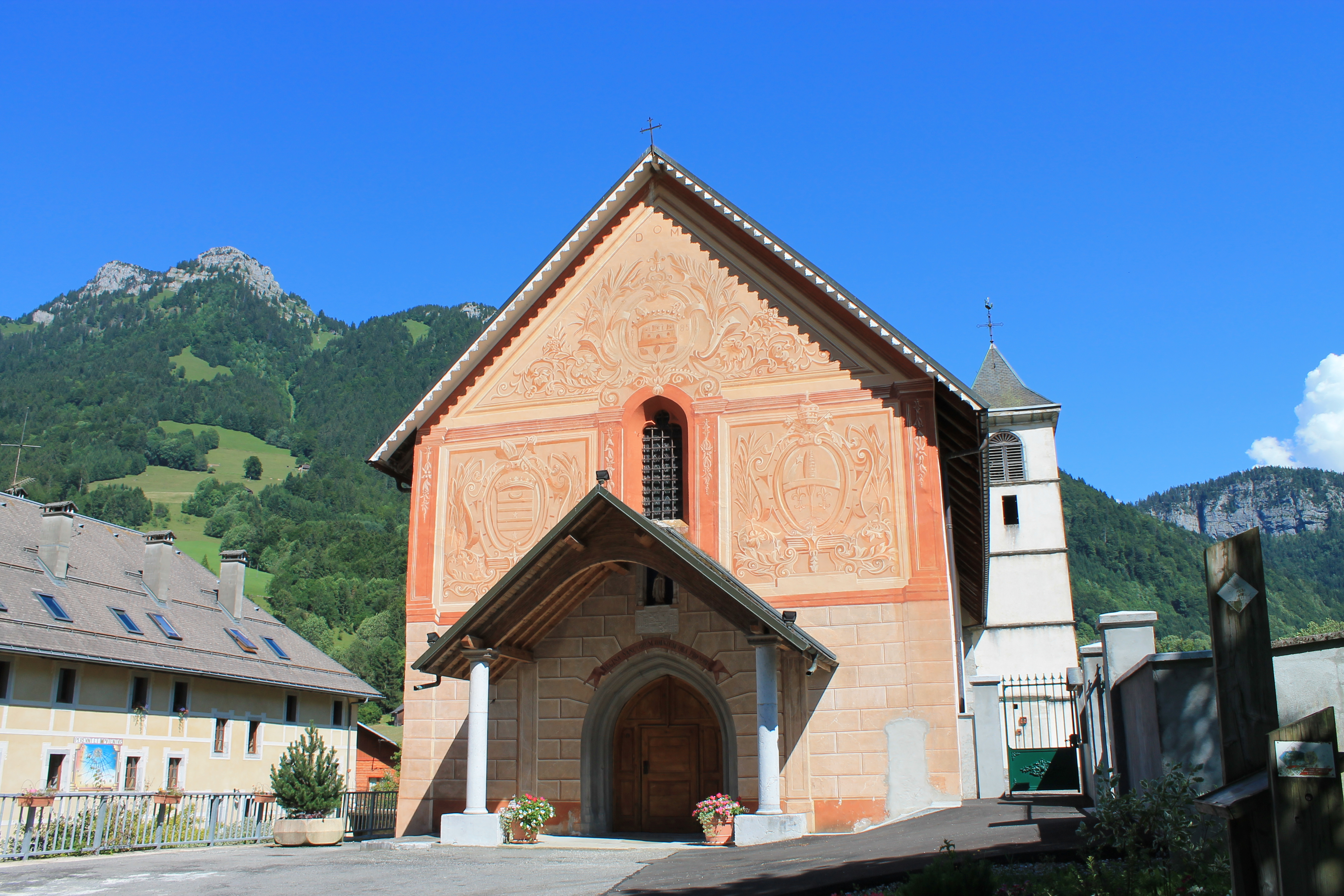
View of Notre-Dame-de-Tous-les-Saints church in Entremont. On the left, in the background, the abbey building.

=== Monastery buildings ===
The former convent was partially destroyed, with only one large building remaining. Until the late 19th century, this structure housed the presbytery, the town hall, and the local school. Restored in 1998, it stands on an elevated site and is a vestige of the former abbey. The building is lime-plastered in ochre tones, with window frames reflecting the neoclassical architectural style known as "Sardinian style." (Note: In Savoy, the neoclassical architectural style is commonly referred to as the "Sardinian" style, highlighting its external origin and association with the House of Savoy following its restoration in 1815. The term reflects contemporary views that the style produced conventional and occasionally rigid architectural forms.) It measures 22.50 meters in length and 13.40 meters in width.

The canons wore a monastic habit consisting of an undyed wool robe (cowl), a shoulder cape (almuce), and a black cope open at the front, with an attached hood. The Priory Museum presents the history of monastic life at the site and during the period.

Views of the building

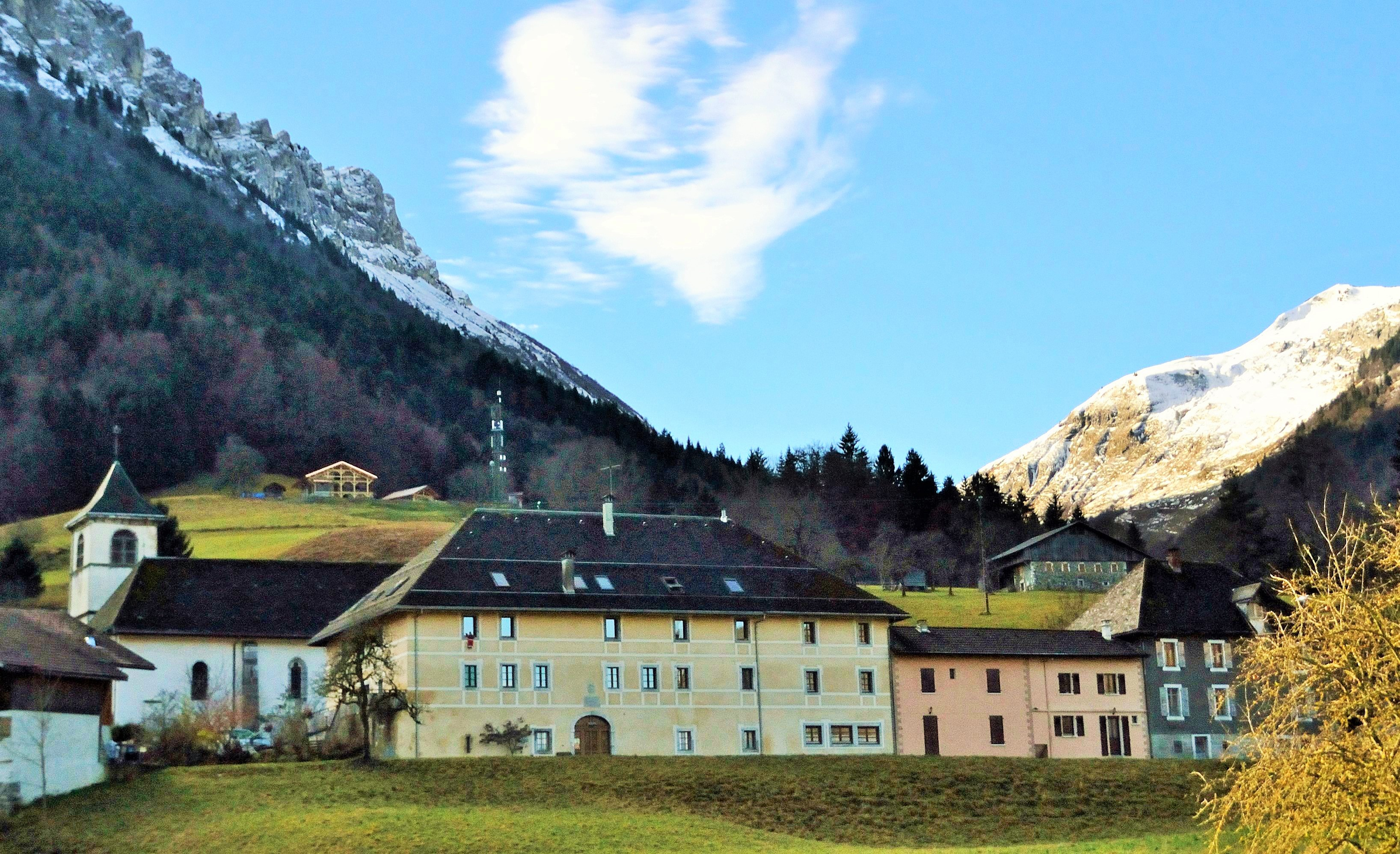
Abbey and church (on the right, the “Miléna gallery”).

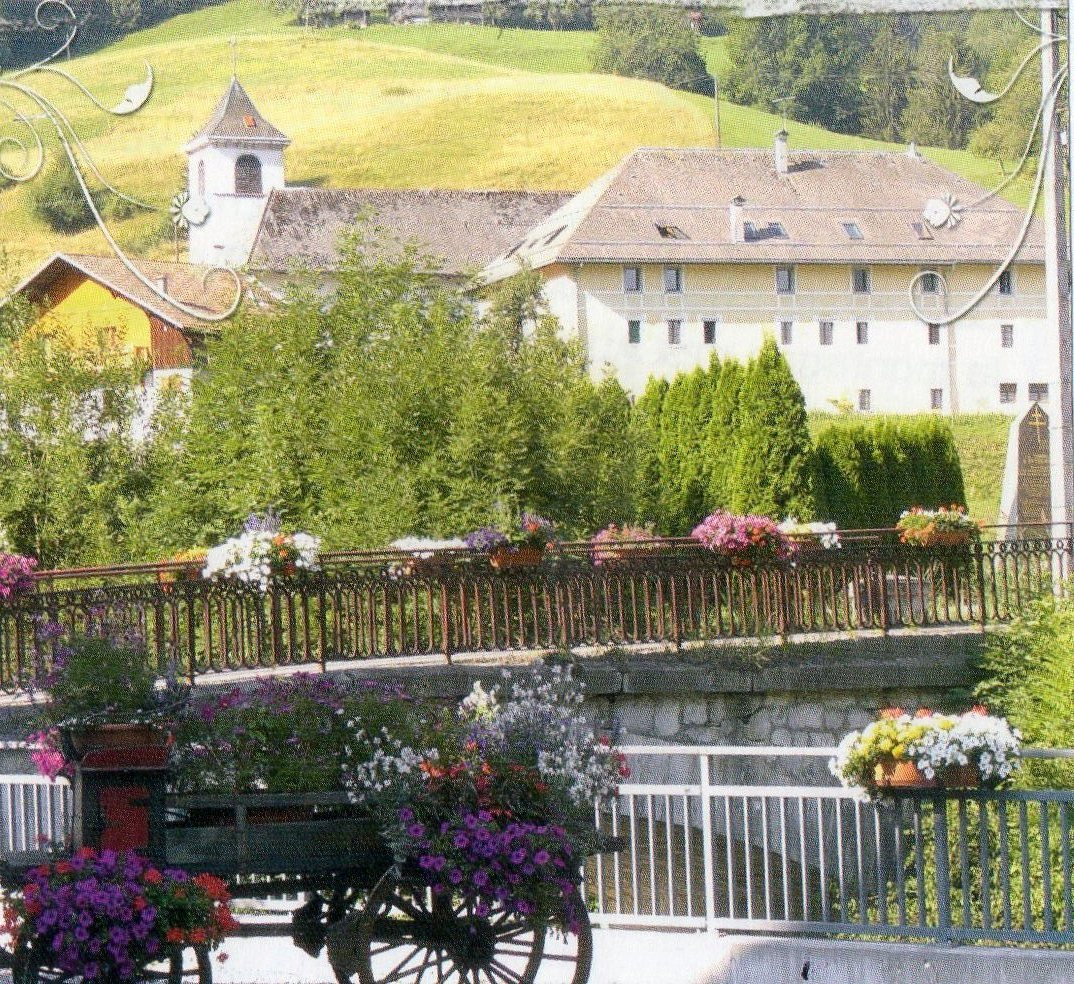
View of the abbey, with the bridge over the Borne in the foreground.

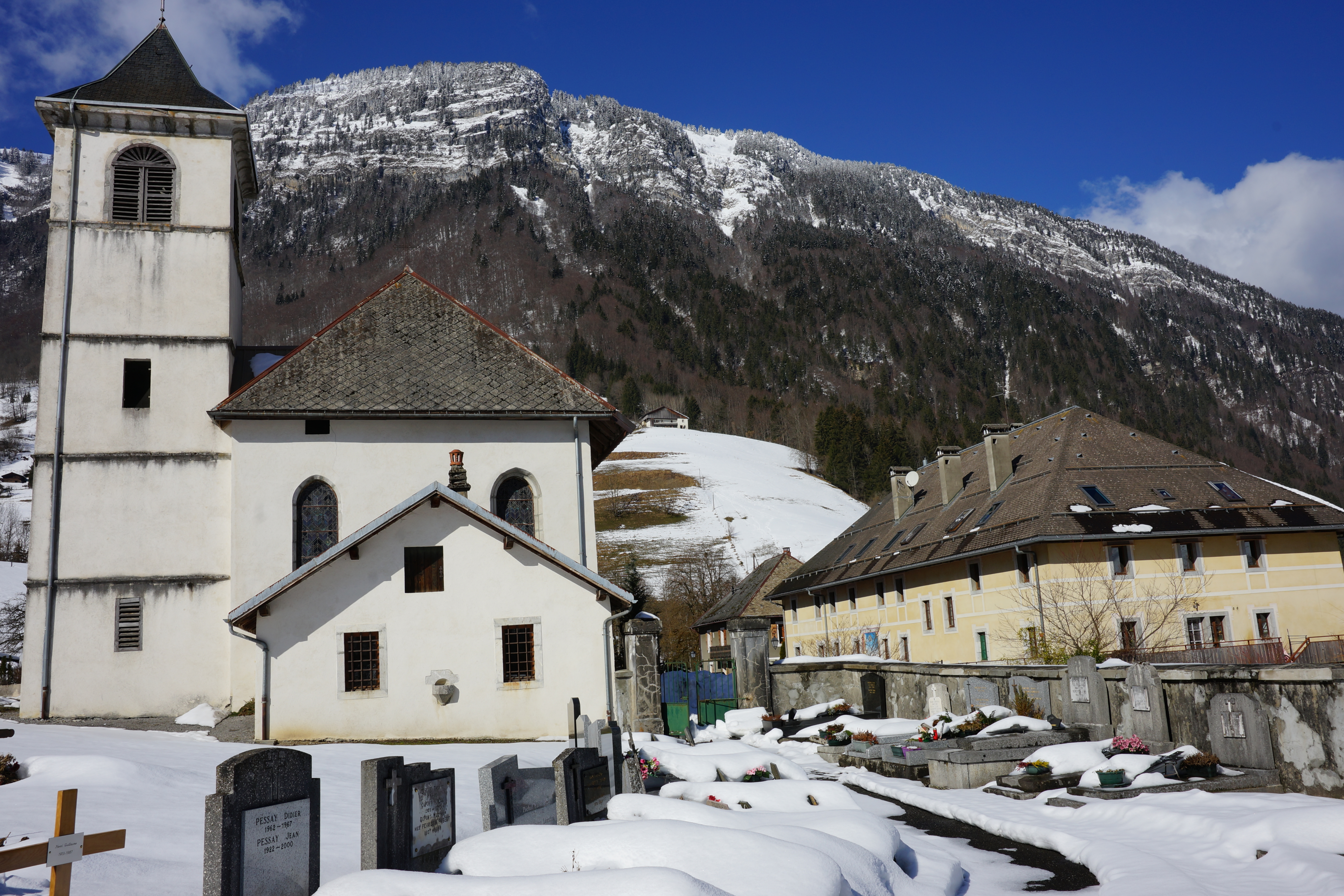
Notre-Dame-de-tous-les-Saints church and abbey.

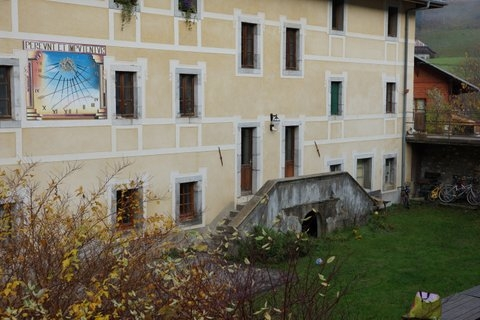
South facade of the building.

== Archaeological excavations ==
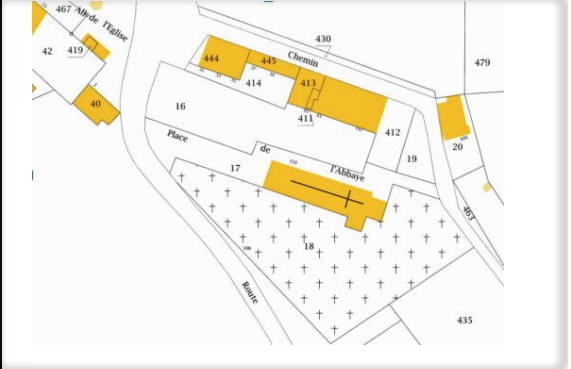
Cadastral plan of the former abbey (Ministry of Public Accounts).

On 15 and 16 July 2020, a geophysical survey was conducted at the site by Amélie Quiquerez, lecturer and researcher at the University of Burgundy. Funded by the Maison de l’Orient et de la Méditerranée in Lyon, the survey covered two plots adjacent to the existing buildings. The results indicated the possible presence of now-vanished structures, arranged according to the typical layout of monasteries of Canons Regular, comparable to the abbeys of Abondance and Sixt.

Since 2021, the Abbey of Entremont has been the site of an archaeological training excavation organized by the University of Savoie Mont Blanc, under the direction of Sidonie Bochaton—initially a doctoral candidate at the University Lumière Lyon 2, and since September 2022, a lecturer and researcher at the University of Toulouse-Jean Jaurès. The first excavation, conducted from 30 August to 11 September 2021, aimed to locate the remains of the cloister. A square trench revealed the northeast corner of the cloister's atrium and the former northern circulation gallery. These elements, absent from 18th-century plans, along with a burial containing two skeletons—one dated by radiocarbon analysis—were attributed to the 13th century.

A new multi-year excavation campaign began in 2022. It uncovered the eastern gallery of the medieval cloister and the negative imprint of the original eastern wing's interior façade. A dense burial zone was identified in this area, and two skeletons were dated to the late Middle Ages or early modern period. A 17th-century basin was also found during the 2021–2023 campaigns. In 2023, a well dating to the abbey's founding was uncovered. The 2024 campaign concluded with the discovery of a new cloister configuration from the modern period. That same year, an in-depth study of the abbey church facilitated the reconstruction of its architectural development.

== See also ==
- Order of Saint-Ruf
- Roman Catholic Diocese of Annecy

== Notes ==
1. In Savoy, the neoclassical architectural style is commonly referred to as the "Sardinian" style, highlighting its external origin and association with the House of Savoy following its restoration in 1815. The term reflects contemporary views that the style produced conventional and occasionally rigid architectural forms.

== Bibliography ==
=== General works ===
- Baud, Henri; Mariotte, Jean-Yves; Guerrier, Alain (1980). Histoire des communes savoyardes : Le Faucigny [History of the communes of Savoie: Faucigny] (in French). Éditions Horvath. ISBN 2-7171-0159-4.
- Bochaton, Sidonie (2023). L'abbaye de Sixt. Des chanoines réguliers en Faucigny (XIIe siècle au XIXe siècle) [Sixt Abbey. Canons Regular in Faucigny (12th to 19th centuries)]. Mémoires & documents (in French). Annecy: Académie salésienne.
- Delerce, Arnaud (2011). Une abbaye de montagne Sainte-Marie d'Aulps : son histoire et son domaine par ses archives [A mountain abbey Sainte-Marie d'Aulps: its history and estate through its archives]. Documents d'histoire savoyarde (in French). Vol. 4. Académie salésienne. ISBN 978-2-902030-62-0.
- Guichonnet, Paul (2007). Nouvelle encyclopédie de la Haute-Savoie : Hier et aujourd'hui [New encyclopedia of Haute-Savoie: Yesterday and today] (in French). Les Marches: La Fontaine de Siloé. p. 147. ISBN 978-2-8420-6374-0.
- Oursel, Raymond (2008). Les chemins du sacré : L'art sacré en Savoie [Les chemins du sacré: Sacred art in Savoy]. Les Savoisiennes (in French). Vol. 1. Les Marches: La Fontaine de Siloé. p. 76. ISBN 978-2-8420-6350-4.

=== Books and articles about the abbey ===
- Bastard-Rosset, Albin; Lefort, Michel (1994). Les riches heures de l'abbaye d'Entremont [The rich hours of Entremont Abbey] (in French). Association pour la sauvegarde du Patrimoine d'Entremont.
- Bochaton, Sidonie (2023). "L'abbaye augustinienne d'Entremont (2020-2022)" [The Augustinian Abbey of Entremont (2020-2022)]. La revue savoisienne (in French): 216–220.
- Bochaton, Sidonie; Laissus, Denis; Ripart, Laurent (2023). "L'abbaye d'Entremont à la croisée des recherches" [Entremont Abbey at the crossroads of research]. La Rubrique des Patrimoines de Savoie (in French): 216–220.
- Coutin, Chanoine François (1962). "L'abbaye d'Entremont-en-Genevois (1154-1776) et le prieuré de Poisy (1426-1776)" [Entremont-en-Genevois abbey (1154-1776) and Poisy priory (1426-1776)]. Mémoires et documents de l'Académie salésienne (in French) (75): 51–63.
- Delerce, Arnaud (2019). L'abbaye d'Abondance et sa congrégation d'après la reconstitution de son chartrier (1108-1300) [The Abbey of Abondance and its congregation according to the reconstitution of its charters (1108-1300)] (in French). Presses universitaires de Savoie.
- Guichonnet, Paul (1946). "La chasse d'Entremont" [The Entremont hunt]. Revue savoisienne (in French).
- Piccard, Louis-Étienne (1895). L'abbaye d'Entremont [Entremont Abbey]. Mémoires et documents (in French). Vol. IX. Thonon-les-Bains: Académie chablaisienne. ISBN 2-7171-0159-4.
- Mémoires et documents [Briefs and documents] (in French). Vol. XXIII. Académie salésienne. pp. 213–226.

=== Archaeological notes ===
- Bochaton, Sidonie (2020). "Glières-Val-de-Borne – Abbaye d'Entremont" [Glières-Val-de-Borne - Entremont Abbey]. ADLFI. Archéologie de la France - Informations (in French).
- Bochaton, Sidonie (2021). "Glières-Val-de-Borne – Abbaye d'Entremont" [Glières-Val-de-Borne - Entremont Abbey]. ADLFI. Archéologie de la France - Informations (in French).
- Bochaton, Sidonie (2022). "Glières-Val-de-Borne – Abbaye d'Entremont" [Glières-Val-de-Borne - Entremont Abbey]. ADLFI. Archéologie de la France - Informations (in French).

=== Excavation reports ===
- Bochaton, Sidonie; Quiquerez, Amélie (2020). Glières-Val de Borne. Abbaye d'Entremont. Prospections géophysiques [Glières-Val de Borne. Entremont Abbey. Geophysical surveys] (PDF) (in French). Rapport final d'opération archéologique.
- Bochaton, Sidonie; Bétend-Desgranges, Bérénice (2021). Glières-Val de Borne. Abbaye d'Entremont. Le cloître [Glières-Val de Borne. Entremont Abbey. The cloister] (in French). Rapport final d'opération archéologique.
- Bochaton, Sidonie; Donati, Lisa (2022). Abbaye d'Entremont. Le cloître 2 [Glières-Val de Borne. Entremont Abbey. The cloister 2] (in French). Rapport final d'opération archéologique.
- Bochaton, Sidonie; Donati, Lisa (2023). Abbaye d'Entremont. Le cloître 3 [Glières-Val de Borne. Entremont Abbey. The cloister 3] (in French). Rapport final d'opération archéologique.
- Bochaton, Sidonie; Donati, Lisa (2024). Abbaye d'Entremont. Le cloître 4 [Glières-Val de Borne. Entremont Abbey. The cloister 4] (in French). Rapport final d'opération archéologique [2022-2024].
