= Commedia erudita =

Sixteenth-century Italian comedy plays

Commedia erudita are Italian comedies written for the enjoyment of scholars in the sixteenth century. They were meant to mimic and emulate the works of Terence and Plautus.

Audiences could expect plentiful use of monologues, asides, over-hearing, misunderstandings, mistaken identity, and disguise. The comedy is derived at the expense of authority figures behaving foolishly or amorous young men. The audience were also entertained by the performers that helped create the carnivalesque atmosphere.

Like the Roman comedy it comes from, commedia erudita is a festive experience. It was used for weddings and welcoming celebrities visiting town. Their shows were typically only for the members of the court, but sometimes it was opened up to lesser court servants.

== Beginning of commedia erudita ==
=== Rebirth of Plautus and Terence ===
The development of commedia erudita was widely anticipated by writers and audiences. While there are known medieval examples of adaptations of Roman plays, like Hrotsvitha of Gandersheim who adapted Terents, there was now a sustained attempt to restore the comedies written by the Romans in the 2nd century B.C.E. A century prior to the creation of commedia erudita, twelve previously unknown Plautus plays were discovered by Nicholas Cusanus, and Donatus's commentary on Terence was uncovered by Giovanni Aurispa. These events spawned new interest in Plautus and Terence.

Roman theatre took a century from rediscovery to restoration due to three major factors:

==== Antiquity ====
It was difficult for audiences to relate to many situations and themes expressed in the stories. Also, at this time there was still considerable ignorance of the Romans' stage structure, which was vastly different from fifteenth-century theater spaces.

==== Language ====
A century was spent by scholars transcribing, editing, translating, commenting, and performing the texts. Writers were slow and hesitant due to their uncertainty of Roman language and verse.

==== The Church ====
They resisted the movement because all other entertainment at the time had backing from the church and support from secular authorities.

=== Sacre rappresentazioni ===
The "Mystery Plays" were the only widespread scripted vernacular in Italy in the fourteenth century. These performances were for popular audiences with understanding of biblical stories and faith in the divine mysteries. Their entertainment relied heavily on spectacle. The sacre rappresentazioni plays had stagings of all kinds of frightful miracles and martyrdoms (ex. the skinning of St. Bartholomew with the use of adroit manipulation and flesh-colored lights). Because the public was already accustomed to this level of shock value, commedia erudita writers had to find a way to include spectacle in their shows as well.

=== Humanism ===
These didactic literary experiments were almost always prose pieces, written by students, teachers, and scholars calling out against authority. The contents of these outbursts were usually farcical and obscene. Their authors thought of them as light-hearted youthful compositions.

=== Piccolomini's Criside ===
Published in 1444, written in Latin by of Enea Silvio Piccolomini (future Pope Pius II), was the first humanistic work majorly inspired by Plautus. It is an erotic story about a rivalry between two men and it involves their prostitutes. Piccolomini's plot was not world-changing, but his play was. It could be staged on a single set and the dialogue was fairly witty.

=== Antonio Barzizza's La Cauteria ===
La Cauteria was written in 1420s Bologna and was inspired by the works of Terence. Antonio Barzizza decided to write about something that recently happened on his street where an adulterous woman is branded by her husband as punishment. Her lover arrives and threatens to brand the husband. What happens next is the reason the prose is interesting; the husband and wife are helped by two servants and at this time there is a conversation that contains clever cross-person dialogue – much like the writings of Plautus.

=== Eteria ===
This play's author is anonymous. It has a complicated plot that focuses on two separate, but interrelated love stories; this is a huge step forward for a Latin playwright. As in Roman comedy, intrigue is created when a witty servant tricks the elderly authority figures into giving her their money. She does it so she can give it to the young men who were denied their ladies.

The characters are believable. The dialogue flows. It even has a well-orchestrated disguise scene. In addition, never before had there been a published Latin play that explicitly borrowed pieces of Roman theatre.

== Latin comedy ==
Before the Roman texts started being used for inspiration, there were many story-telling elements that the Latin writers had not figured out yet. There used to be a disregard for dramatic unity. Latin plays had a tendency to jump from scene to scene in a disjunct manner. It was jarring and hard for audiences to follow. Sometimes there were scenes written that they later realized were impossible to do on stage. Dialogue also had a tendency to be stiff and lengthy. Practical jokes were very popular in these shows, but they were only very simple tricks.

The Roman comedies gave Latin writers a guide to make their own plays flow better. They were shown how to write a story with complex, interwoven storylines. Romans also had much more complicated practical jokes, such as cuckolding.

== Developments of commedia erudita ==
=== New character ===
The playwrights of commedia erudita invented a completely new comedic character. His job is to come out at the beginning and give the audience the prologue. While he gives the prologue he is also supposed to go around and be friendly to the audience members. He loosens up the crowd and gives them valuable information at the same time.

=== Five act structure ===
This would become mandatory in Italian comedy and spread elsewhere. The purpose of breaking up the acts is to allow time for intermedi which are small intermissions and the chance to see spectacles, listen to music, and dance.

== Themes ==
=== Adultery ===
Many commedia erudita plays appealed to the baser instincts of the human beings watching them. Scripts were full of indecent remarks and behavior that was improper. Writers aimed to keep the attention of audience members by presenting to them sinful living.

=== Domestic life ===
Commedia erudita included depictions of contemporary domestic life.

== Dramaturgy ==
For the most part the Latins tried to imitate the Romans dramaturgically. They used a unitary stage in a restricted outdoor setting. Their time scale was limited. There was a single list of dramatic personae.

== Aretino's La Cortigiana ==
This commedia erudita play attacks members of the court by depicting them villainously. It is a dark comedy, full of biting satire.

== Perception ==
Historians often look back on commedia erudita and make the conclusion that it was an artistic failure. Critics of these plays complain that they are immoral and lack any form of didactic purpose.

Benedetto Varchi argues that the issue with the commedia erudita plays was that their comedy was not honest. Vachi condemns the writers for only focusing on trying to get laughs. He complains that by always trying to amuse the audience, the characters are limited to just the most unrealistic situations imaginable. Vachi adds that it is troubling because these kinds of dishonest situations are not only written by common men with poor judgement, but also by learned men.

The erudite comedies did have a few small victories, however. Commedia erudita was constantly trying to overcome their competition, the church (see sacre rappresentazioni). The religious performances were quite lengthy in nature, some taking place over two tedious days. The brevity of commedia erudita plays made them more favorable.
