= Hideo Katayama =

Hideo Katayama (片山 英男, Katayama Hideo; 1948 – 23 October 2023) was a Japanese scholar of the Classics and the Renaissance.

Born in Tokyo, Katayama graduated from the University of Tokyo in 1971 with a thesis on Apollonius of Rhodes, tutored by Masaaki Kubo. After obtaining an MA from the same institution in 1973 with a thesis on Callimachus, in 1977 he was nominated assistant professor in classics. In 1982–1983, Katayama was visiting professor at the University of Padua, invited by Vittore Branca. Upon returning to Japan, Katayama was promoted to associate professor, whence to Full Professor in 1993, retiring in 2012.

He served as principal investigator for the Study for Multilingual Text Processing on the Multimedia Communication System (promoted by the Japan Society for the Promotion of Science, 1995–2000) and sat in the scientific board of the academic journal "Archivum mentis" (Leo S. Olschki). After an initial interest in Hellenistic poets and the digital humanities, his principal research topic became the history of classical reception and the history of classical studies. He published the first critical edition of the first book of Angelo Poliziano's Miscellanea and the critical edition of Gasparino Barzizza's Exordia Epistolaria. With other scholars, Katayama edited the photographic reproduction and commentary of a Humanistic manuscript kept at the University of Tokyo library.

Katayama also translated into Japanese the Homeric Hymns (Kitsumi & Katayama 1985), Erasmus' Institutio principis christiani (1989), Sophocles' Philoctetes (1990), the pseudo-Euripidean Rhesus (1992), and Cicero's De inventione (2000).

== Selected publications ==
- Katayama, H. (1975). "詩人ポリュペーモス : テオクリトス,11" [Polyphemos the Poet : Theokritos 11]. Journal of Classical Studies (in Japanese). 23: 55–68. doi:10.20578/jclst.23.0_55.
- Itsumi, K.; Katayama, H. (1976). "ギリシア悲劇の詩句分析と電子計算機" [Computer-aided Analysis of Tragic Trimeter]. Journal of Classical Studies (in Japanese). 24: 75–86. doi:10.20578/jclst.24.0_75.
- Katayama, H. (1981). "Miscellaneorum centuria prima Angeli Politiani". Gogaku Bungaku Ronbunshu. 7: 167–428.
- Katayama, H. (1982). "カルリマコスの声" [What Callimachus said]. Journal of Classical Studies (in Japanese). 30: 56–66. doi:10.20578/jclst.30.0_56.
- Kitsumi, K.; Katayama, H., eds. (1985). Yottsu no Girisha shinwa: Homēros sanka yori [Four Greek Myths: from the Homeric Hymns] (in Japanese). Tokyo.
- Nishimoto, H.; Katayama, H.; Shibano, H.; Tsukimura, T.; Nagami, S., eds. (1987). Codex Streeterianus. Codex humanisticus in artem epistolariam Bibliothecae Universitatis Tokiensis A100.1300 phototypice editus ac transscriptus. Tokyo: University.
- Barzizza, G. (1993). Katayama, H. (ed.). Exordia epistolaria. Tokyo: Keiso Shobo.
- Katayama, H. (2011). "Riconsiderazioni su un manoscritto scoperto da Poggio Bracciolini". Archivum mentis. 1: 67–84.

== Bibliography ==
- Hyuga, T. (2024). "Ricordo di Hideo Katayama". Archivum mentis. 13: 337–339.
- Poliziano, A. (2020). Dyck, A. R.; Cottrell, A. (eds.). Miscellanies. «I Tatti» Renaissance Library, 89–90. Vol. I–II. Cambridge, MA.: Harvard University Press. ISBN 978 06 740 4937 6.
