= Abbey of Saint-Ruf =

Abbey of Saint-Ruf may refer to:

- Abbey of Saint-Ruf, Avignon
- Abbey of Saint-Ruf, Valence
- Order of Saint-Ruf
