= Saint Ruf =

Saint Ruf may refer to:

- Saint Rufus
- Saint-Ruf
