= Entremont, Haute-Savoie =

Entremont Intreman (Savoyard)
- Part of Glières-Val-de-Borne
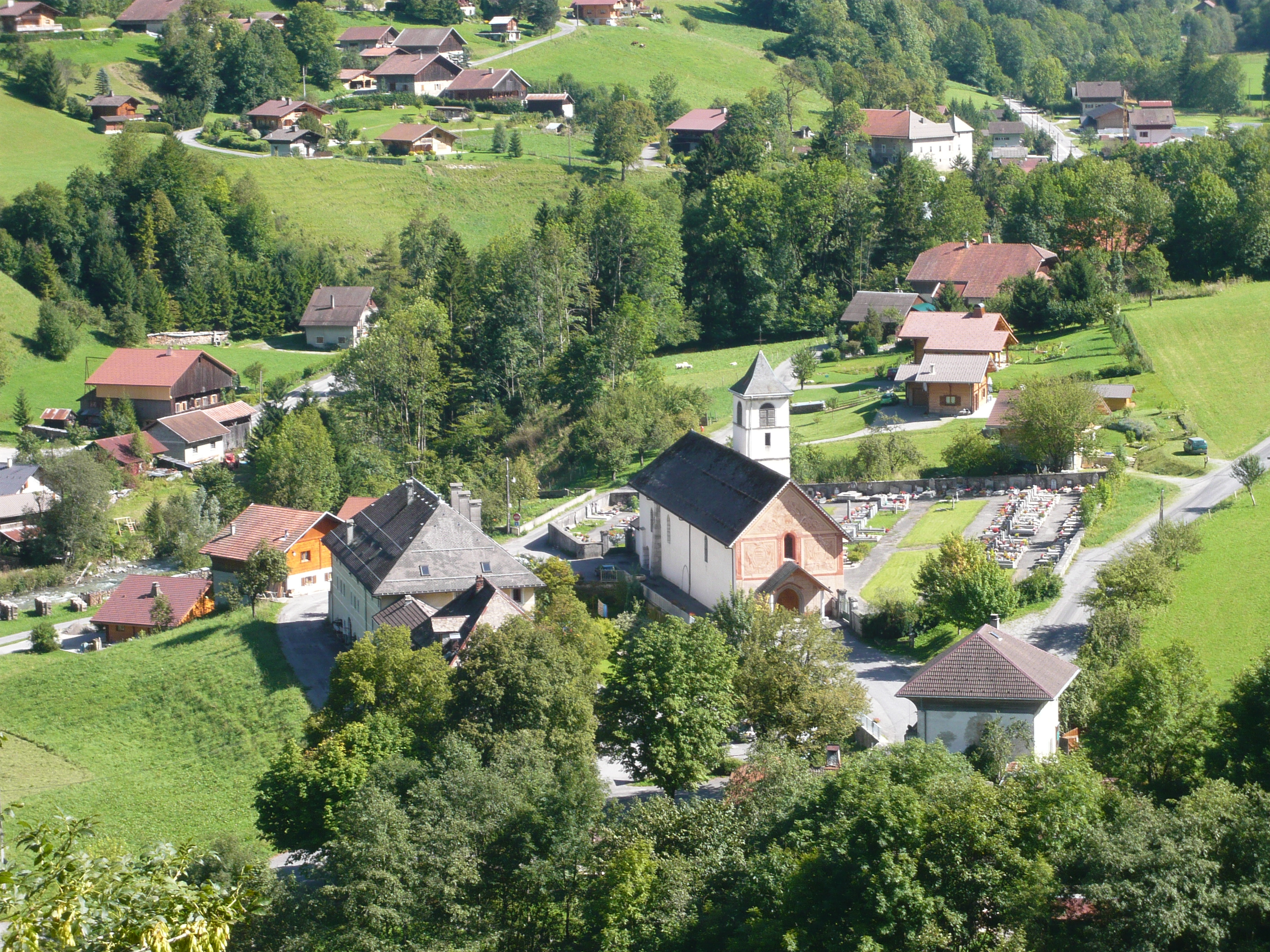
- An aerial view of Entremont

- Coat of arms
- Location of Entremont
- Location within France Location within Auvergne-Rhône-Alpes
- Coordinates: 45°57′27″N 6°23′23″E
- Country: France
- Region: Auvergne-Rhône-Alpes
- Department: Haute-Savoie
- Arrondissement: Bonneville
- Canton: Faverges
- Commune: Glières-Val-de-Borne
- Area^{1}: 18.35 km^{2} (7.08 sq mi)
- Highest elevation: 2,019 m (6,624 ft)
- Lowest elevation: 755 m (2,477 ft)
- Population (2016): 661
  - Density: 36.0/km^{2} (93.3/sq mi)
- Demonym: Entremontains
- Time zone: UTC+01:00 (CET)
  - Summer (DST): UTC+02:00 (CEST)
- Postal code: 74130
- ^{1} French Land Register data, which excludes lakes, ponds, glaciers > 1 km^{2} (0.386 sq mi or 247 acres) and river estuaries.

Entremont (French pronunciation: [ɑ̃tʁəmɔ̃]; Savoyard: Intreman) is a former commune in the Haute-Savoie department in the Auvergne-Rhône-Alpes region in south-eastern France. On 1 January 2019, it was merged into the new commune Glières-Val-de-Borne.

== See also ==
- Communes of the Haute-Savoie department

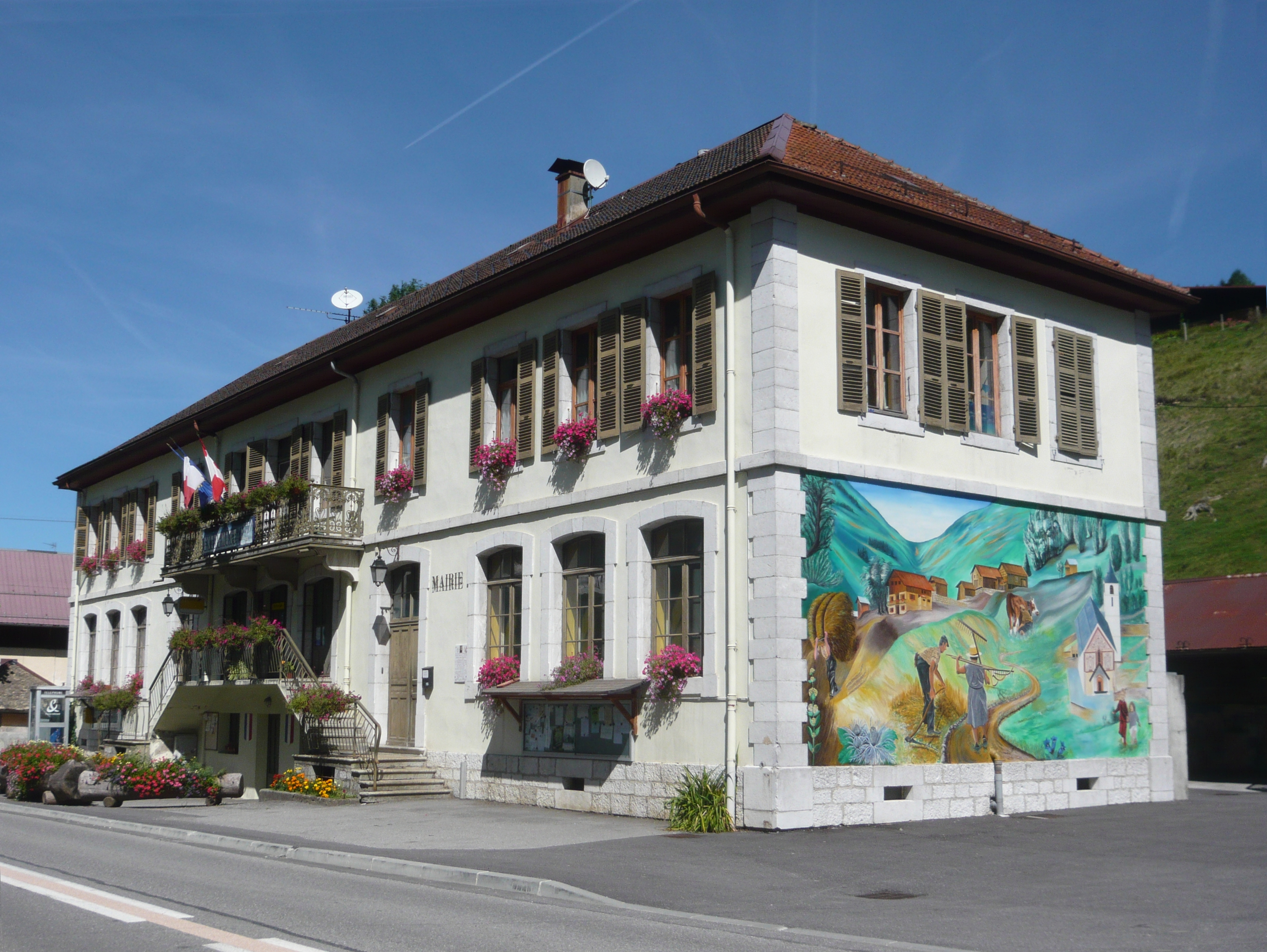
Entremont city hall
