= Paul Scriptoris =

German Franciscan mathematician, Scotist and professor

Paul Scriptoris (c. 1460 – 21 October 1505) was a German Franciscan mathematician, Scotist, and professor at the University of Tübingen. His surname is a Latin translation of the original German name Schreiber ("writer"). Born in Weil der Stadt, Scriptoris studied at Paris and joined the Franciscan order. He subsequently began teaching at Tübingen. Konrad Pellikan, who became Scriptoris’ most favored pupil, joined him at Tübingen in March 1496.

Scriptoris was an extremely successful teacher in the natural sciences, and awakened interest in this subject in many of his students. His students included his fellow professors and members of other religious orders.

He lectured on the cosmography of Ptolemy and also taught and studied Euclid. He also wrote a commentary on a work by Duns Scotus, which was published by Johann Ottmar on 24 March 1498. It carries the distinction of being the first book created with a printing press in the city of Tübingen.

At Tübingen, Scriptoris opposed the appointment of the Realist Johann Heynlin to the faculty.

In 1499, Scriptoris was lecturing against transubstantiation of the bread into the body of Christ. For this he was banished by the Franciscans and died in exile, at Kaysersberg in Alsace.

== Works ==
- Lectura Fratris Pauli Scriptoris Ordinis Minorum de observantia quam edidit declarando subtilissimas Doctoris subtilis sententias circa Magistrum in primo libro, Tübingen, 1498, online.
- Carpi (ed. Joannes de Montesdoca), 1506.
- These des Paul Scriptoris OFM über die in Konstanz übliche Praxis der öffentlichen Buße, in: Rottenburger Jb. für Kirchengesch. 11 (1992), 115 f.

== Sources ==
- Helmut Feld (1995). "Scriptoris, Paul". In Bautz, Traugott (ed.). Biographisch-Bibliographisches Kirchenlexikon (BBKL) (in German). Vol. 9. Herzberg: Bautz. cols. 1258–1261. ISBN 3-88309-058-1.
- Scotism (Scriptoris mentioned)
- Martyrs
