= Stefano Fieschi =

Episcopal Secretary

Stephanus Fliscus

Philosophical work
- School: Renaissance humanism
- Main interests: Rhetoric
- Notable works: Sententiarum variationes seu Synonyma

Stefano Fieschi (Latin Stephanus Fliscus or Philiscus) of Soncino, was a 15th-century Italian scholar, episcopal secretary, and pedagogue.

== Biography ==
Fliscus was a student of the famous rhetorician Gasparino Barzizza from about 1429–1430. He was a secretary to Zenone Castiglione, bishop of Lisieux.

== Works ==
Fliscus is best known for his Sententiarum variationes seu Synonyma, a collection of sentences in Latin and other languages as an aid for letter-writing. This popular collection was republished as part of Albrecht von Eyb's Praecepta artis rhetoricae and Margarita poetica. Succeeding editions included German, Italian, Dutch, French, and Spanish sentence equivalents. The Spanish version was printed by Antonio de Nebrija's publisher. Fliscus also published a version under the title De componendis epistolis.

== See also ==
- Janua linguarum reserata
