= Lietbertus of Saint-Ruf =

Lietbertus of Saint-Ruf was the abbot of Saint-Ruf, in the diocese of Avignon, from 1100 to 1110.

Letbert was the author of a commentary on the Psalms called Flores Psalmorum. He also wrote the customs for or of Saint-Ruf (the Liber ecclesiastici et canonici ordinis). These customs were based upon the monastic recommendations of Saint Augustine, and were a great influence on other houses of regular canons which would become the Augustinian Order.

Letbert was educated at the collegiate church of Saint Peter in Lille, which was dedicated in 1066 - hence his other cognomen, Letbert of Lille.
