= Guillaume Fichet =

French scholar

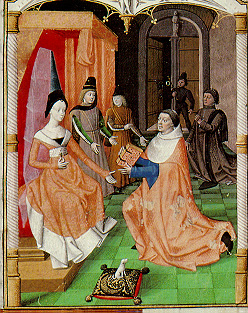
Fichet and Yolande of Valois

Guillaume Fichet (French: [fiʃɛ]; 21 September 1433 – c. 1480) was a French scholar, who cooperated with Johann Heynlin to establish the first printing press in France (Paris) in 1470.

== Biography ==
He was born at Le Petit-Bornand-les-Glières, in Savoy.

He studied in Paris between 1450 and 1454 and then followed up on his studies in Avignon. According to his own account as mentioned in his Rhetorica, he taught liberal arts, scriptures and rhetoric since the mid-1450s. In 1467, he was elected rector of the Sorbonne.

In 1469 he and Heynlin installed the first press ever set up in France. They brought from Basel three printers: Michael Friburger, Ulrich Gering and Martin Crantz. He was in charge of the library of the Sorbonne between 1469 and 1471. The first book printed was the Epistolae ("Letters") of Gasparinus Pergamensis (1470). Also Fichet's own works followed, such as his Rhetorica (1471). The publisher gained recognition by publishing several speeches made by leading Cardinal Basilios Bessarion. Bessarion's 1471-2 "Orations against the Turks," as the piece came to be called, is known as one of the first pieces of mass-propaganda used in Europe. Together with Bessarion, he left Paris and went to Rome in 1472.
