= Johann Heynlin =

German-born scholar, humanist and theologian

The first book printed in France: Epistolae ("Letters"), by Gasparinus de Bergamo (Gasparino Barzizza). It was printed in 1470 by the press established in Paris by Johann Heynlin.

Johann Heynlin, variously spelled Heynlein, Henelyn, Henlin, Hélin, Hemlin, Hegelin, Steinlin; and translated as Jean à Lapide, Jean La Pierre (Lapierre, de la Pierre), Johannes Lapideus, Johannes Lapidanus, Johannes de Lapide (c. 1425 – 12 March 1496) was a German-born scholar, humanist and theologian, who introduced the first printing press in France (Paris) in 1470.

== Early life and education ==
Born in Stein, near Pforzheim, in Baden-Württemberg, Heynlin may have been of Swabian origin. (From Stein, meaning "stone" in German, are derived his translated Latinized surnames Lapideus or a Lapide and Gallicized surname La Pierre.) He studied Leipzig between 1448 and 1452 where he read about Aristotle. In 1453 he entered the University of Leuven before he proceeded to Paris to pursue the study of philosophy and theology. In Paris, where he stayed between 1454 and 1464, Heynlin came in contact with the foremost representatives of Realism, who, recognizing Heynlin's abilities and probable future influence, exerted their powers to the utmost to mould his mind after their own and thus make him like themselves a bitter opponent of Nominalism. In 1462 he became a member of the Sorbonne, at the time a remarkable feat.

== Academic career ==
In 1464, Heynlin went to the University of Basel where he lectured philosophy. The old controversy regarding the nature of Universals had not yet subsided, and in the university of Basel Nominalism held sway. Hence in view of this and the maintenance of peace within the institution, the admission of Heynlin to the faculty was not accomplished without a most vigorous opposition.

Once a member of the faculty, he hoped to rid it of all Nominalistic tendencies, nor was he disappointed in his expectation. In 1465, he became dean of the faculty of arts and in this capacity he revised the university statutes and thus brought about a firmly established curriculum of studies. In 1466, he returned to Paris, obtained the doctorate in theology, was in 1469 elected rector of the university and became professor of theology at the Sorbonne.

=== Heynlin's printing press ===
Heynlin's most noteworthy achievement was the establishment of the first printing-press in Paris. Heynlin worked closely with Guillaume Fichet (1433-ca. 1480), another professor at the Sorbonne, who had also come from abroad: from Le Petit-Bornand-les-Glières, in Savoy.

Heynlin brought Swiss workmen to install this press in the buildings of the Sorbonne at the end of 1469 or the beginning of 1470: Ulrich Gering (or Guerinch or Guernich) (1445-1510), Michael Friburger and Martin Crantz (or Krantz). Ulrich Gering may have come from Münster in the canton of Aargau, Friburger from Colmar and Crantz may have also come from Münster or Strasbourg. Heynlin gave valuable pecuniary aid to their undertakings, especially for the printing of the works of the Church Fathers. King Louis XI granted letters of naturalization to all three workmen in 1475.

Their first publication with this press, and the first book printed in France, was a collection of letters by the fifteenth century grammarian Gasparinus de Bergamo (Gasparino Barzizza). The Epistolae Gasparini Pergamensis (1470) were intended to provide an exemplar for students for the writing of artful and elegant Latin. Their second work was a translation of Sallust (1470-1471), the third the Orationes of Bessarion (1471), and the fourth was Fichet's own Rhetorica in 1471. The number of the works which they published from 1470 to 1472 amounts to some thirty works.

At the end of 1472 or at the beginning of 1473, Heynlin and Fichet left the Sorbonne to settle on Rue Saint-Jacques. Two of their apprentices, Pierre de Kaysere (Petrus Caesaris) and Jean Stoll, established around the same time and on the same street their own competing printing press, with the emblem of the Soufflet-Vert.

== Other activities ==
The German humanist Johann Reuchlin attached himself to Heynlin in Paris, and later followed him to the young University of Basel in 1474. He became the preacher of several churches in Basel, such as in the churches of St. Leonhard, St.Peter or the Women Convent of Muttenz. During the battles of Grandson and Morat between the Swiss and Charles the Bold, Heynlin was a preacher not only in Basel but also in Bern where in 1480 he was unsuccessfully offered to become the priest of the Minster.

In 1478, he was called to teach theology in the newly founded University of Tübingen. There, his learning, eloquence and reputation secured for him the same year the rectorship. The opposition, however, he met from the Nominalists Gabriel Biel, Paul Scriptoris, and others, rendered his service here of short duration. He severed his connexion with the university, proceeded to Baden-Baden and thence to Bern, where he engaged in preaching. In 1486, he returned to Basel, where in 1487 he entered the Carthusian monastery of St. Margarethenthal to spend his declining years in prayer and literary work. He was a neighbor to the printer Johann Amerbach. He further became an influential collaborator in Amerbachs workshop as an editor and proofer and introduced the use of indexes, book chapters and other helps to make book better accessible for its readers.

== Death and legacy ==
He died on the 12 March 1496 in Basel. His friends wanted to erect a memory plaque for him, but this was not permitted by the prior of the monastery he died. He was close to Sebastian Brant. His prominent library of 200 volumes he had donated the monastery at the time he entered it and is now deposited in the University Library of Basel.

== Works ==
- Epistolarum liber Gasparini Pergamensis, 1470.
- Premonitio circa sermones de conceptione gloriose virginis Marie, found in Meffret, Sermones de tempore et de sanctis, 1488.
- Resolutorium dubiorum circa celebrationem missarum occurentium, 1492.
- Libri artis logicae Porphyrii et Aristotelis c. commento J. (Kommentare zu Werken des Aristoteles, Gilbert de la Porrée, Porphyrios), 1495.
