= Le Petit-Bornand-les-Glières =

Le Petit-Bornand-les-Glières Lé Ptyou-Bornan (Savoyard)
- Part of Glières-Val-de-Borne
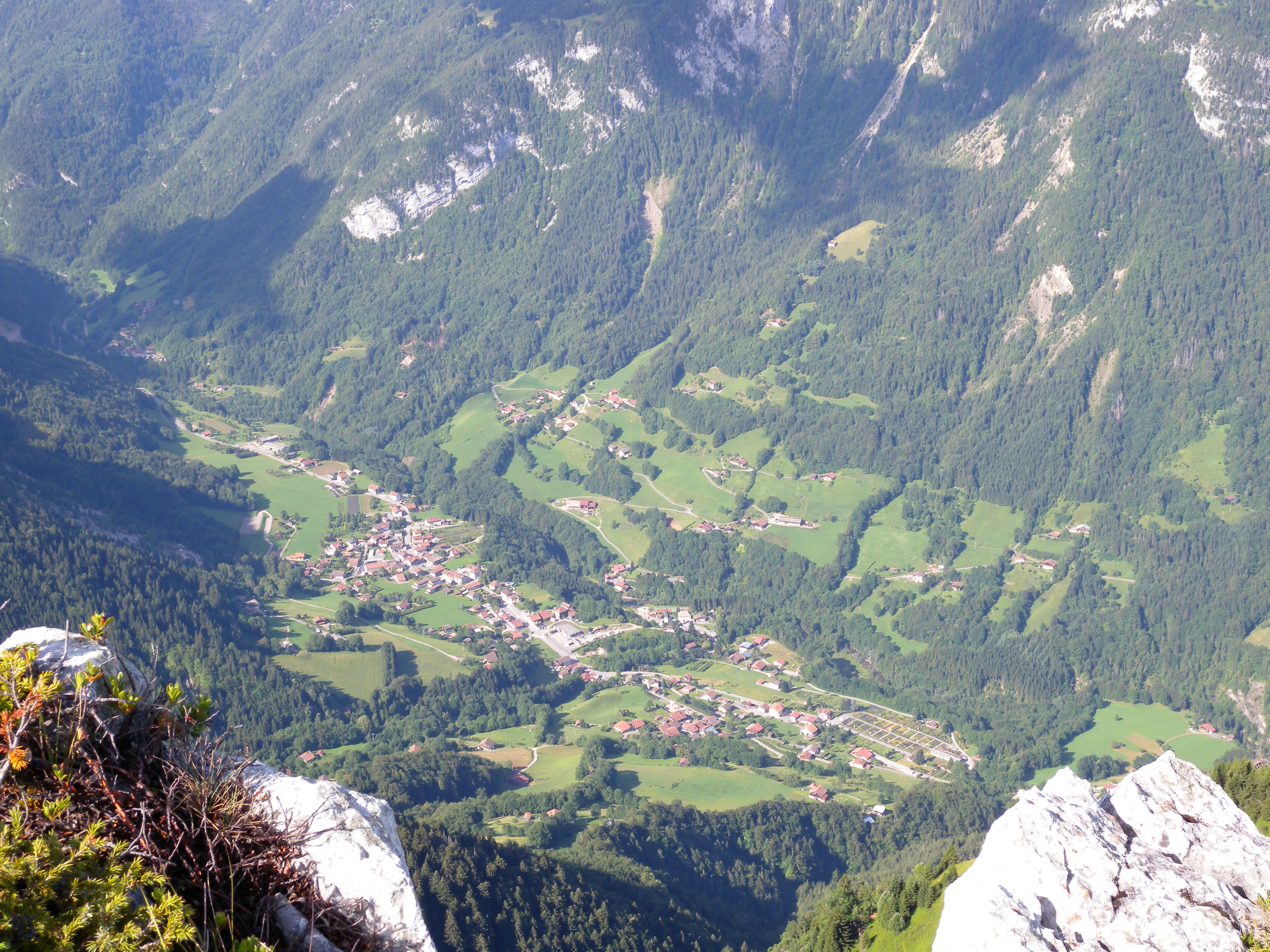
- A general view of Le Petit-Bornand-les-Glières
- Location of Le Petit-Bornand-les-Glières
- Location within France Location within Auvergne-Rhône-Alpes
- Coordinates: 46°00′02″N 6°23′46″E
- Country: France
- Region: Auvergne-Rhône-Alpes
- Department: Haute-Savoie
- Arrondissement: Bonneville
- Canton: Bonneville
- Commune: Glières-Val-de-Borne
- Area^{1}: 53.42 km^{2} (20.63 sq mi)
- Elevation: 732 m (2,402 ft)
- Highest elevation: 2,408 m (7,900 ft)
- Lowest elevation: 591 m (1,939 ft)
- Population (2016): 1,126
  - Density: 21.08/km^{2} (54.59/sq mi)
- Time zone: UTC+01:00 (CET)
  - Summer (DST): UTC+02:00 (CEST)
- Postal code: 74130
- ^{1} French Land Register data, which excludes lakes, ponds, glaciers > 1 km^{2} (0.386 sq mi or 247 acres) and river estuaries.

Le Petit-Bornand-les-Glières (French pronunciation: [lə pəti bɔʁnɑ̃ le ɡlijɛʁ]; Savoyard: Lé Ptyou-Bornan), commonly referred to as Petit-Bornand, is a former commune in the Haute-Savoie department in the Auvergne-Rhône-Alpes region in south-eastern France. On 1 January 2019, it was merged with its neighbour village Entrement to form the new commune of Glières-Val-de-Borne.

Petit-Bornand has a number of dairy farms, tourist accommodations and secondary residences. It is part of the region officially authorised to produce reblochon and denote it as such.

== People ==
Guillaume Fichet (1433-c. 1480) was born in this village. With Johann Heynlin, Fichet set up the first printing press in France in 1470.

== See also ==
- Communes of the Haute-Savoie department
