= Abbey of Saint-Ruf, Avignon =

Abbey in Vaucluse, France

Coordinates: 43°55′58″N 4°48′47″E

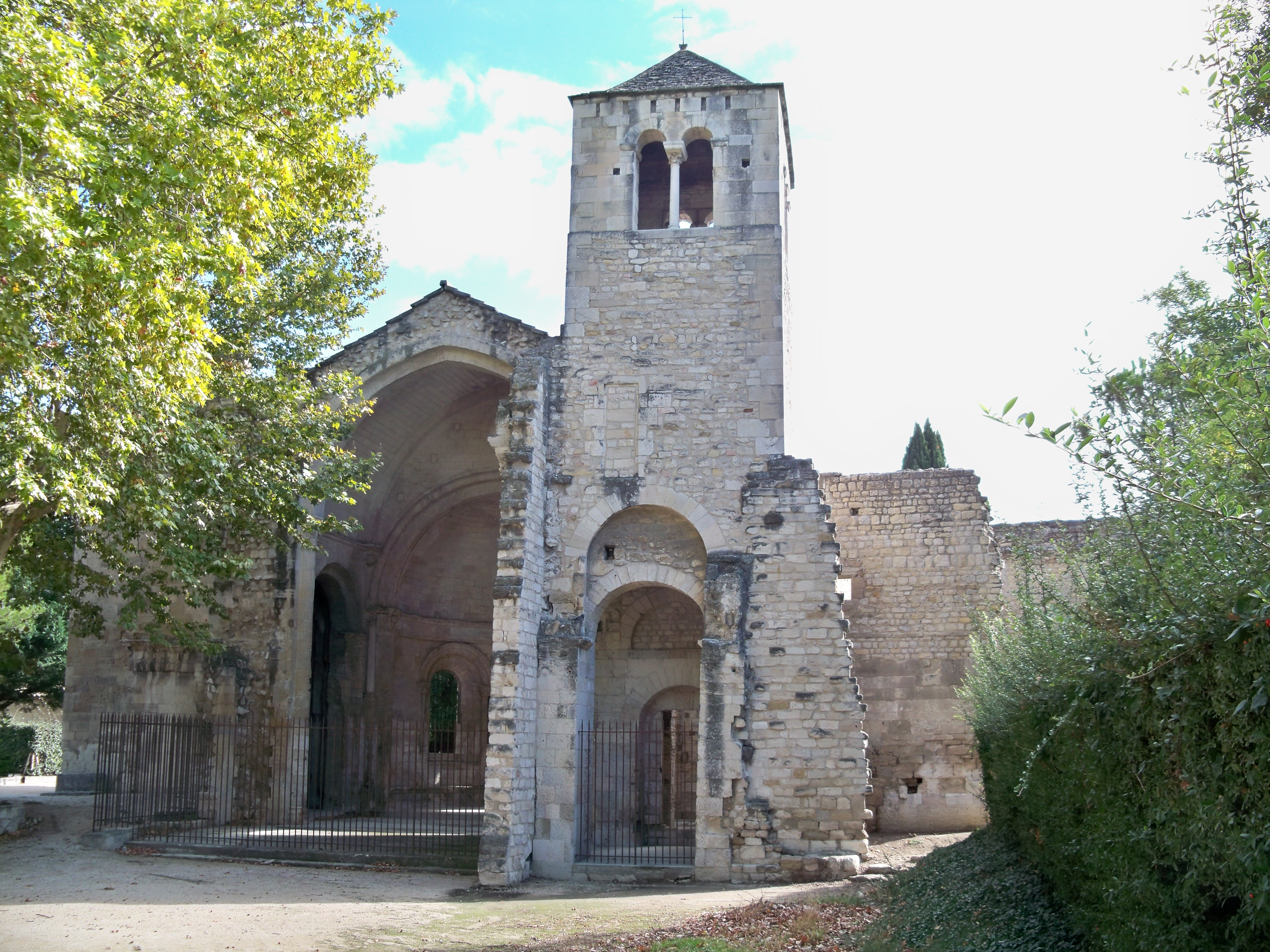
Ruins of Saint-Ruf today

The abbey of Saint-Ruf (Occitan: Abadia de Sant-Ruf) was a house of canons regular in the city of Avignon between the 11th and 18th centuries. It was the mother house and original headquarters of the Order of Saint-Ruf. After 1158, it was reduced to a priory.

== Origins ==
The earliest reference to a church dedicated to Saint Rufus of Avignon belonging to the cathedral of Avignon is a precept of the Emperor Louis the Blind from 18 August 917. The church, which lay outside the city walls to the south, is called an abbatiola (lit. 'little abbey'). It may have been one of the oldest churches in Avignon, perhaps from as early as the 4th century. Rufus came to be seen as the first bishop of Avignon, he was not regarded as such in the 10th–11th centuries, when his name was associated with the church. He may have been its founder. Possibly he was buried there, as the church was located near a cemetery.

On 1 January 1039, Bishop Benedict of Avignon granted the dilapidated church to four of his clergymen named Kamaldus, Odilo, Pontius and Durandus, upon their request. This is considered the foundation act of the canonry of Saint-Ruf. According to the grant, the bishop ceded to his clerics the tithes owed to the old church. The four are described religiose and they dedicated their community to Saint Justus as well as Saint Rufus. At first, they followed the rule of Aachen. Eventually they came to recognize the provost of the cathedral chapter as their rector. In or shortly after 1080, Saint-Ruf was promoted to an abbey by Pope Gregory VII. The first abbot, Arbert, introduced the customary and, by 1084, the rule of Saint Augustine.

== Growth ==
Saint-Ruf grew rapidly, acquiring many priories through donations. Pope Urban II confirmed its properties and approved its customs in 1092, the first time a pope had formally approved the vocation of the canons regular. In 1084, two canons of Saint-Ruf were among the six companions of Bruno the Carthusian when he founded Grande Chartreuse. In 1085, a monk of Saint-Ruf named Bertrand was elected bishop of Barcelona. Abbot Arbert himself was elected bishop of Avignon in 1096. He was succeeded as abbot by Lietbert. In 1107, the canon Berengar was elected bishop of Orange. In 1111, Olegarius was elected abbot, but he left in 1116 to become bishop of Barcelona.

Lietbert wrote a new version of the customary, the Liber ordinis. He also wrote a commentary on the Regula tertia, the third rule of Saint Augustine. As a result, when the stricter Ordo monasterii or second rule of Saint Augustine came into vogue, the abbey of Saint-Ruf stuck to the Regula tertia. The cathedral chapters of Maguelone, Mende, Uzès, Tortosa and Tarragona adopted the customs of Saint-Ruf. Its customs also influenced those of Marbach, Indersdorf, Rottenbuch, Chaumousey and Aureil. The monastery of the Holy Cross in Coimbra, Portugal, adopted its customs.

In the wake of the First Crusade, Saint-Ruf was granted a church and lands in the County of Tripoli by Count Raymond I, but this acquisition was ephemeral.

Between 1143 and 1147 English monk Nicholas Breakspear was elected abbot. He traveled to Catalonia, where he was present at the siege of Tortosa (1148) and acquired a church in Barcelona. In 1150, he was made a cardinal and in 1154 was elected Pope Adrian IV. In 1158, the headquarters of the order was moved to a new abbey in Valence.

== Decline ==
Saint-Ruf in Avignon was the site of two interprovincial councils, the council of 1326 and council of 1337, representing the three provinces of Provence: Arles, Aix and Embrun.

Against the threat of routiers, the abbey walls were crenellated in the 14th century. Damaged during the French Wars of Religion, the abbey was renovated in 1628. It was in such disrepair in 1764 that it was abandoned. During the French Revolution, the buildings were confiscated and sold off as biens nationaux on 14 September 1796. They were declared a monument historique in 1889.
