= Amancy =

Amancy Amanfi (Savoyard)
- Commune
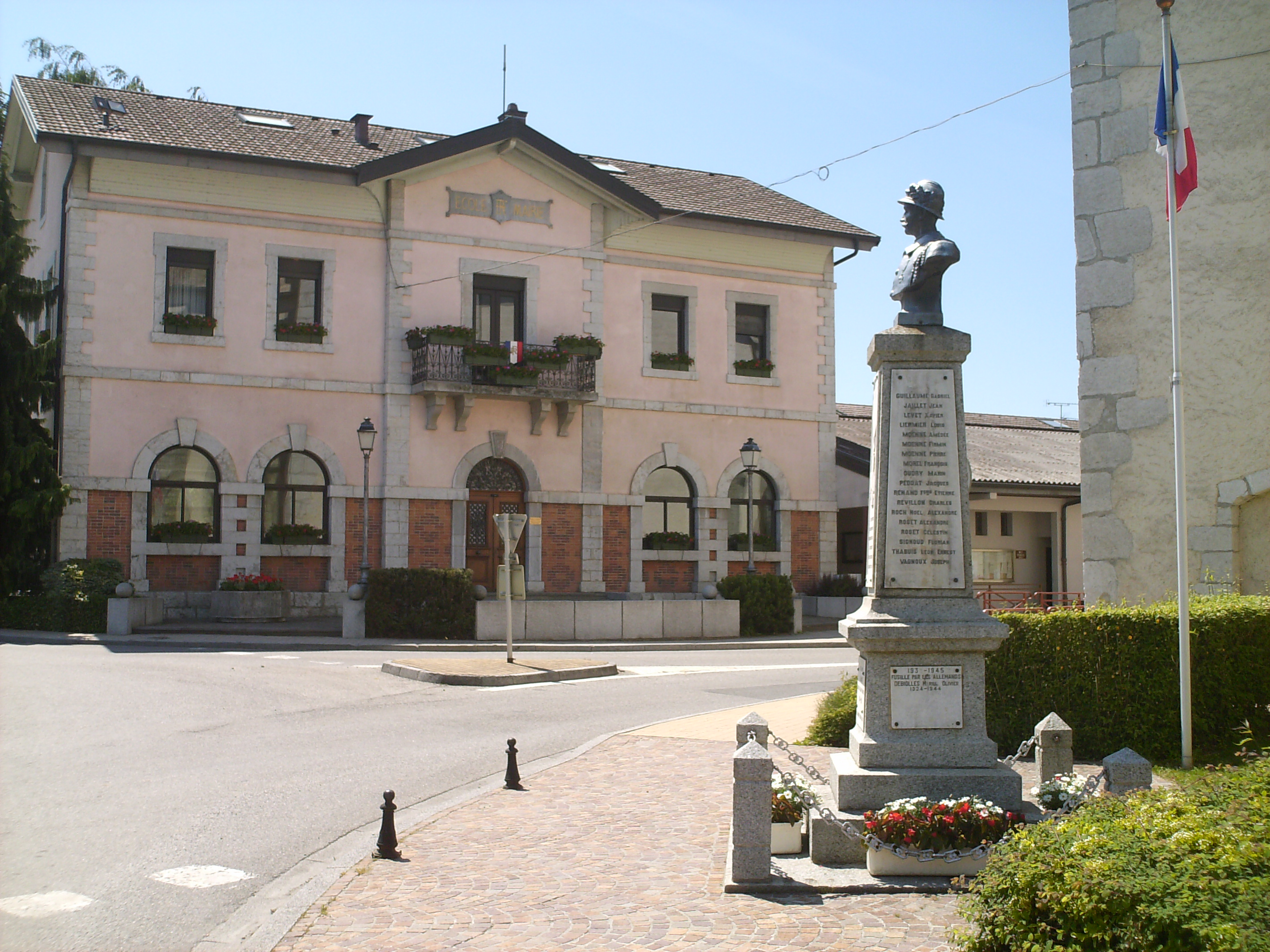
- Town hall

- Coat of arms
- Location of Amancy
- Location within France Location within Auvergne-Rhône-Alpes
- Coordinates: 46°04′30″N 6°19′48″E
- Country: France
- Region: Auvergne-Rhône-Alpes
- Department: Haute-Savoie
- Arrondissement: Bonneville
- Canton: La Roche-sur-Foron
- Intercommunality: Pays Rochois

Government
  - Mayor (2020–2026): Dominique Doldo
- Area^{1}: 8.62 km^{2} (3.33 sq mi)
- Highest elevation: 624 m (2,047 ft)
- Lowest elevation: 444 m (1,457 ft)
- Population (2023): 2,792
  - Density: 324/km^{2} (839/sq mi)
- Demonym: Amanciens
- Time zone: UTC+01:00 (CET)
  - Summer (DST): UTC+02:00 (CEST)
- INSEE/Postal code: 74007 /74800
- ^{1} French Land Register data, which excludes lakes, ponds, glaciers > 1 km^{2} (0.386 sq mi or 247 acres) and river estuaries.

Amancy (French pronunciation: [amɑ̃si]; Savoyard: Amanfi) is a commune in the Haute-Savoie department in the Auvergne-Rhône-Alpes region in south-eastern France.

== Population ==
Historical population
Year	Pop.	±% p.a.
1968	1,068	—
1975	1,131	+0.82%
1982	1,403	+3.13%
1990	1,640	+1.97%
1999	1,756	+0.76%
2007	1,889	+0.92%
2012	2,253	+3.59%
2017	2,665	+3.42%
2023	2,792	+0.78%
Source: INSEE

== See also ==
- Communes of the Haute-Savoie department
