= Menthonnex-sous-Clermont =

Menthonnex-sous-Clermont Mintné-dzo-Klyarmon (Savoyard)
- Commune
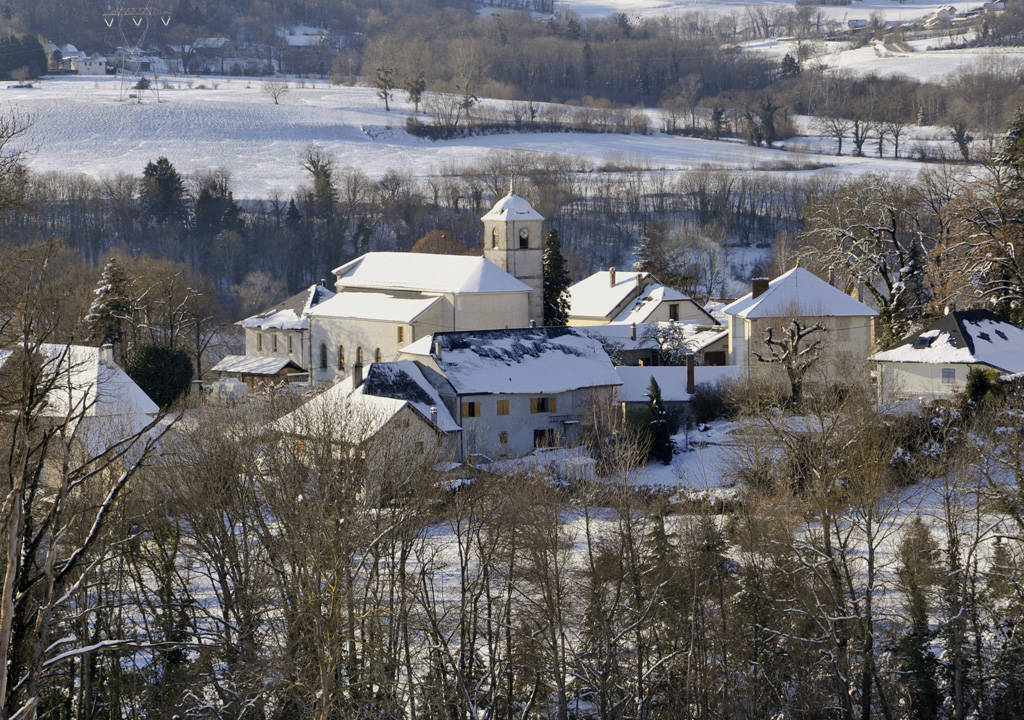
- The church in Menthonnex-sous-Clermont
- Location of Menthonnex-sous-Clermont
- Location within France Location within Auvergne-Rhône-Alpes
- Coordinates: 45°57′59″N 5°56′11″E
- Country: France
- Region: Auvergne-Rhône-Alpes
- Department: Haute-Savoie
- Arrondissement: Saint-Julien-en-Genevois
- Canton: Saint-Julien-en-Genevois
- Intercommunality: Usses et Rhône

Government
  - Mayor (2023–2026): Didier Galmiche
- Area^{1}: 10.14 km^{2} (3.92 sq mi)
- Highest elevation: 749 m (2,457 ft)
- Lowest elevation: 399 m (1,309 ft)
- Population (2023): 811
  - Density: 80.0/km^{2} (207/sq mi)
- Time zone: UTC+01:00 (CET)
  - Summer (DST): UTC+02:00 (CEST)
- INSEE/Postal code: 74178 /74270
- ^{1} French Land Register data, which excludes lakes, ponds, glaciers > 1 km^{2} (0.386 sq mi or 247 acres) and river estuaries.

Menthonnex-sous-Clermont (French pronunciation: [mɑ̃tɔnɛ su klɛʁmɔ̃], literally Menthonnex under Clermont; Savoyard: Mintné-dzo-Klyarmon) is a commune in the Haute-Savoie department in the Auvergne-Rhône-Alpes region in south-eastern France.

== See also ==
- Communes of the Haute-Savoie department
