= Antonio Barzizza =

First page of the Cauteriaria in a 15th-century manuscript

Antonio Barzizza (born c. 1401) was an Italian dramatist.

Barzizza was born in Bergamo, but the Barzizza family was exiled from the city soon after. He was raised by his uncle, Gasparino Barzizza, who was a professor at the University of Bologna, where Antonio studied between 1420 and 1425. He was at the University of Pavia between 1425 and 1429.

Barzizza wrote a comedy entitled Cauteriaria. The date and place of its composition are debated. He may have composed it at Bologna in 1420–1425, but possibly at Pavia or even as late as 1450. The play belongs to the goliardic tradition. In his prologue, Barzizza claims to have been inspired by actual events. A young woman, Scintilla, is unhappily married to an old man, Brachus. She falls in love with a priest, Auleardus. With the help of a servant, she arranges to meet Auleardus. After Brachus finds them together, she is condemned to be branded with a hot iron. Auleardus and his friends intervene to save her. Brachus, shamed for his cruelty, hosts a feast in his house for the lovers. According to Jean-Frédéric Chevalier, Cauteriaria "is perhaps a denunciation of the hypocrisy of some members of the clergy, but above all it is a hymn to love and denunciation of everything that hinders it", in which Barzizza "denounces the female condition which is subjected to the tyrannical rule of men."

Cauteriaria survives in at least 18 manuscripts. The play Fraudiphila of Antonio Cornazzano was partially inspired by Cauteriaria. Peter Luder brought a copy of the play to the University of Heidelberg between 1456 and 1460, where it probably inspired Johannes Reuchlin's Scaenica progymnasmata.

== Bibliography ==
- Bloemendal, Jan (2022). "Johannes Reuchlin's Scaenica progymnasmata (Henno, 1497) and Jacob Spiegel's Commentary (1512): A Local and Transnational Project". Medievalia et Humanistica. 47 (1): 1–22.
- Chevalier, Jean-Frédéric (2013). "Neo-Latin Theatre in Italy". In Jan Bloemendal; Howard Norland (eds.). Neo-Latin Drama in Early Modern Europe. Brill. pp. 25–101.
- Rosso, Paolo (2004). "Tradizione testuale ed aree di diffusione della Cauteriaria di Antonio Barzizza". Humanistica Lovaniensia. 53: 1–92. JSTOR 23974180.
