= Glières-Val-de-Borne =

- Commune
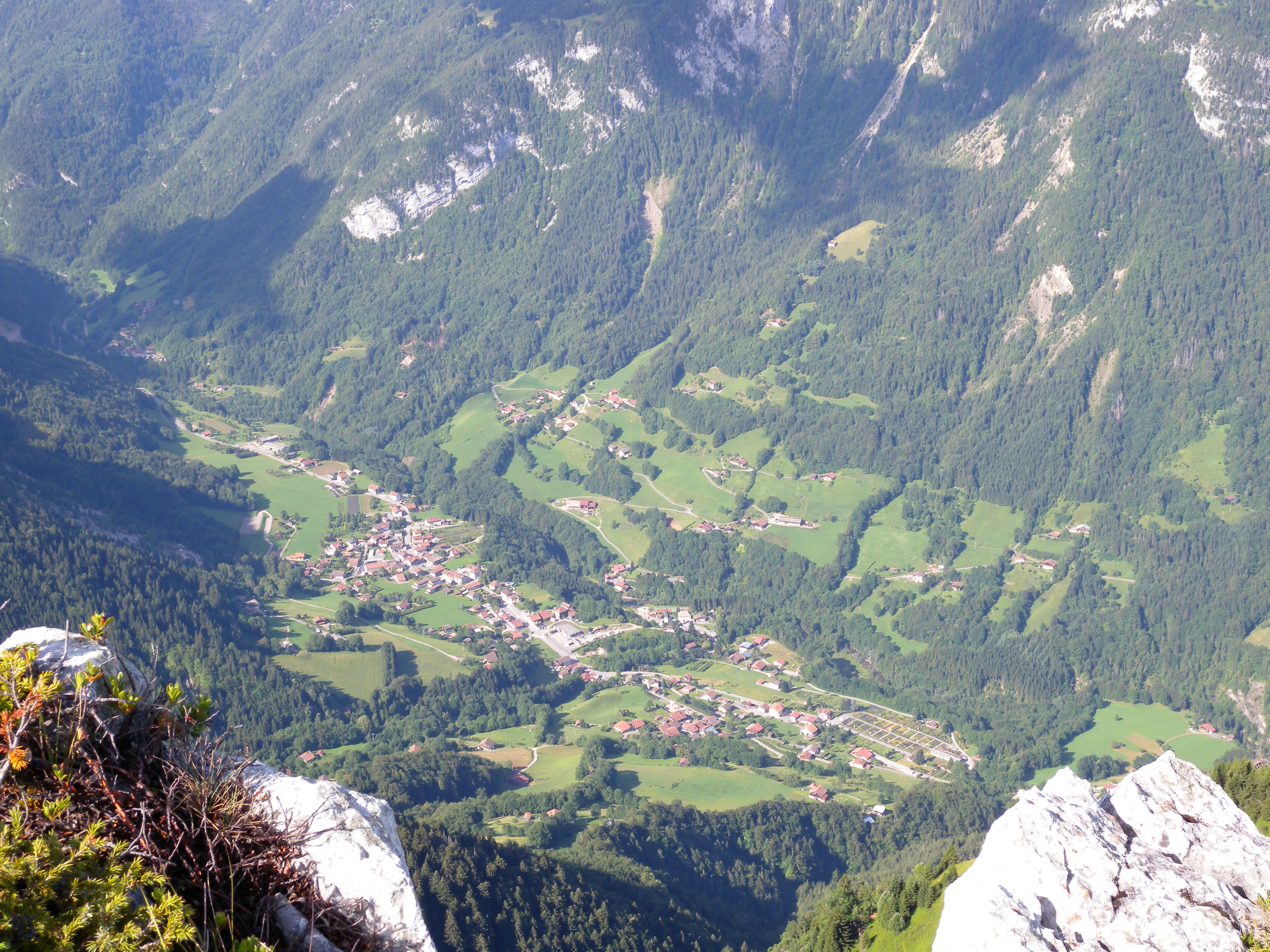
- A general view of Le Petit-Bornand-les-Glières
- Location of Glières-Val-de-Borne
- Location within France Location within Auvergne-Rhône-Alpes
- Coordinates: 46°00′02″N 6°23′46″E
- Country: France
- Region: Auvergne-Rhône-Alpes
- Department: Haute-Savoie
- Arrondissement: Bonneville
- Canton: Bonneville
- Intercommunality: Faucigny-Glières

Government
  - Mayor (2020–2026): Christophe Fournier
- Area^{1}: 73.12 km^{2} (28.23 sq mi)
- Highest elevation: 2,408 m (7,900 ft)
- Lowest elevation: 591 m (1,939 ft)
- Population (2023): 1,824
  - Density: 24.95/km^{2} (64.61/sq mi)
- Time zone: UTC+01:00 (CET)
  - Summer (DST): UTC+02:00 (CEST)
- INSEE/Postal code: 74212 /74130
- ^{1} French Land Register data, which excludes lakes, ponds, glaciers > 1 km^{2} (0.386 sq mi or 247 acres) and river estuaries.

Glières-Val-de-Borne (French pronunciation: [ɡlijɛʁ val də bɔʁn], lit. 'Glières - Vale of Borne') is a commune in the Haute-Savoie department in the Auvergne-Rhône-Alpes region in south-eastern France. It was established on 1 January 2019 by merger of the former communes of Le Petit-Bornand-les-Glières (the seat) and Entremont.

== See also ==
- Communes of the Haute-Savoie department
