= Order of Saint-Ruf =

The Order of Saint-Ruf was a Catholic religious order of canons regular following the rule of Saint Augustine from 1039 until 1774. It traced its history back to the foundation of its mother house and namesake, the abbey of Saint-Ruf in Avignon.

In the late 11th century, Saint-Ruf was associated with the Gregorian reform. In 1092, Pope Urban II confirmed its customs and its properties. By 1095, it had acquired nine churches. Following the introduction of the ordo novus (new order), a stricter interpretation of the rule of Saint Augustine, by Norbert of Xanten, the Order of Saint-Ruf defended the more moderate ordo antiquus (old order). In 1154, a member of the order was elected Pope Adrian IV. In 1158, the headquarters of the order was moved to a new abbey in Valence. The abbey received privileges from the Emperor Frederick I, as it came under direct imperial authority. Bishop Odo of Valence recognized its exemption. Pope Innocent IV (r. 1243–1254) confirmed it as directly subordinate to the Holy See nullo medio.

Pope Urban V (r. 1362–1370) founded the College of Saint-Ruf in Montpellier. In 1482, in his capacity as commendatory abbot, Giuliano della Rovere issued new statutes for the order. In 1488, Pope Innocent VIII confirmed the orders possessions. The 16th century was a period of decline, marked by the French Wars of Religion. By the 18th century, the order had incurred severe debts. It was suppressed and its properties secularized in 1774.

== Dependent churches ==
- Notre-Dame-de-l'Assomption d'Annonay
- Notre-Dame de la Boisse
- Notre-Dame de Cassan
- Notre-Dame d'Entremont
- Notre-Dame-des-Grès
- Notre-Dame de Montfavet
- Notre-Dame de la Platière
- Notre-Dame de la Tour d'Aigues
- Saint-Andéol de Bourg-Saint-Andéol
- Saint-André de La Côte-Saint-André
- Saint-Félix de Valence
- Saint-Genest de Manduel
- Saint-Jacques de Melgueil
- Santa Maria de Besalú
- Santa Maria de Terrassa
- Saint-Martin de Vienne
- Saint-Pierre de Cheffois
- Saint-Pierre in Die
- Saint-Sylvestre de Teillan
- San Miguel de Escalada
- Sant Vicenç de Cardona

== Work cited ==
- Egger, Christoph (2003). "The Canon Regular: St Ruf in context". In B. Bolton; A. Duggan (eds.). Adrian IV, the English Pope, 1154–1159: Studies and Texts. Ashgate. pp. 15–28. ISBN 978-0-75460-708-3.
- Lebrigand, Yvette (1967). L'ordre de Saint-Ruf en France (1039–1774) (Diplôme d'archiviste-paléographe). École nationale des chartes.
- Lebrigand, Yvette (1989). "Origines et première diffusion de l'Ordre de Saint-Ruf". Cahiers de Fanjeaux. 24: 167–179.
- Vones-Liebenstein, Ursula (1996). Saint Ruf und Spanien: Studien zur Verbreitung und zum Wirken der Regularkanoniker von Saint Ruf in Avignon auf der Iberischen Halbinsel (11. und 12. Jahrhundert). Brepols.
- Vones-Liebenstein, Ursula (2016). "The Liber ecclesiastici et canonici ordinis of Lietbert of Saint-Ruf". In Krijn Pansters; Abraham Plunkett-Latimer (eds.). Shaping Stability: The Normation and Formation of Religious Life in the Middle Ages. Brepols. pp. 175–204. doi:10.1484/M.DM-EB.5.111548.
- Vones-Liebenstein, Ursula (2020). "The Customaries of Saint-Ruf". In Krijn Pansters (ed.). A Companion to Medieval Rules and Customaries Series. Brill. pp. 155–191.
