= Mésigny =

- Commune
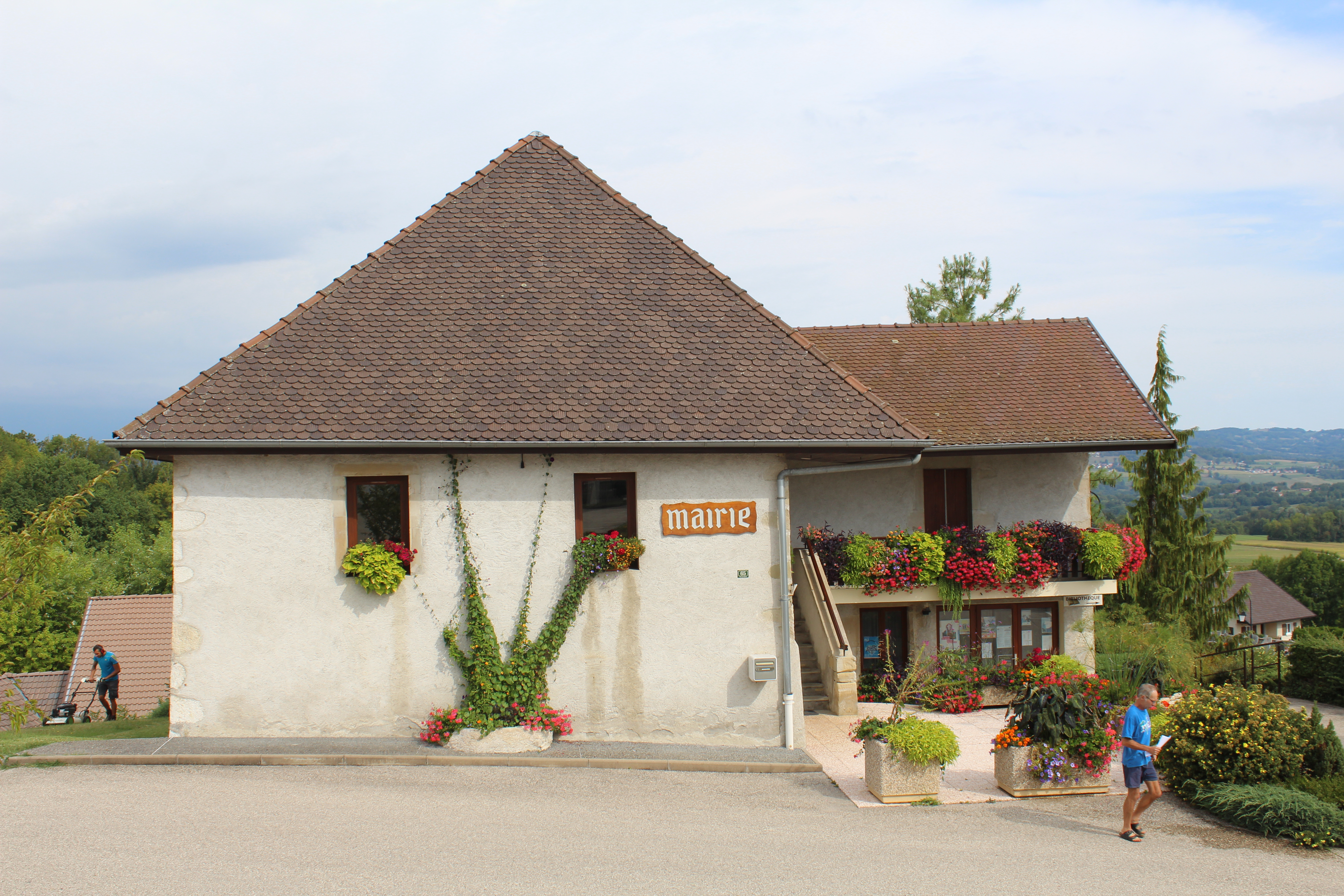
- Town hall
- Location of Mésigny
- Location within France Location within Auvergne-Rhône-Alpes
- Coordinates: 45°59′11″N 6°00′12″E
- Country: France
- Region: Auvergne-Rhône-Alpes
- Department: Haute-Savoie
- Arrondissement: Annecy
- Canton: Annecy-1
- Intercommunality: CC Fier et Usses

Government
  - Mayor (2020–2026): Sylvie Le Roux
- Area^{1}: 6.73 km^{2} (2.60 sq mi)
- Highest elevation: 720 m (2,360 ft)
- Lowest elevation: 400 m (1,300 ft)
- Population (2023): 804
  - Density: 119/km^{2} (309/sq mi)
- Time zone: UTC+01:00 (CET)
  - Summer (DST): UTC+02:00 (CEST)
- INSEE/Postal code: 74179 /74330
- ^{1} French Land Register data, which excludes lakes, ponds, glaciers > 1 km^{2} (0.386 sq mi or 247 acres) and river estuaries.

Mésigny (French pronunciation: [meziɲi]; Arpitan: Mèznyi) is a commune in the Haute-Savoie department in the Auvergne-Rhône-Alpes region in south-eastern France.

== See also ==
- Communes of the Haute-Savoie department
