= Pers-Jussy =

Pers-Jussy Pè-Dyèssi (Savoyard)
- Commune
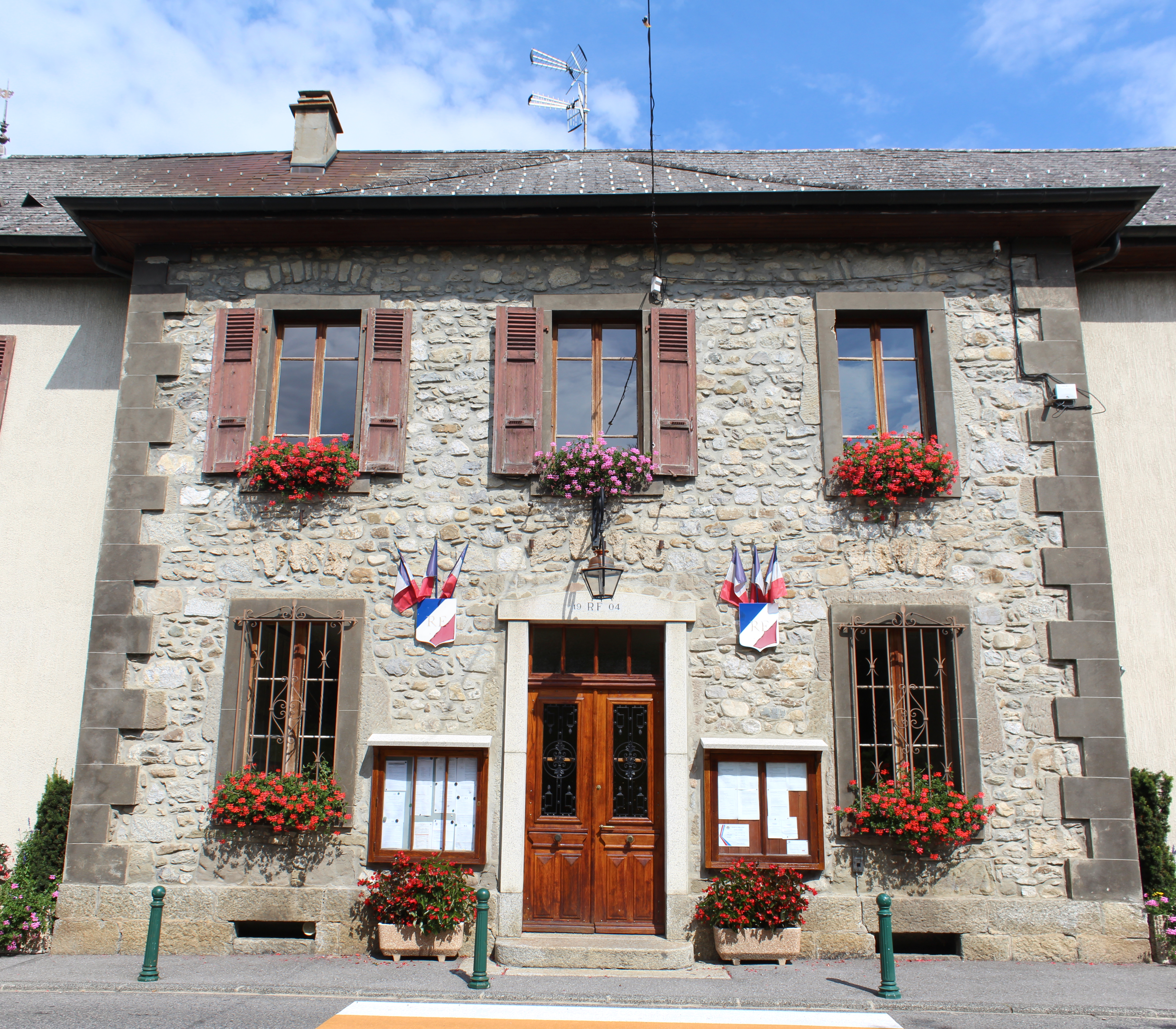
- The town hall of Pers-Jussy

- Coat of arms
- Location of Pers-Jussy
- Location within France Location within Auvergne-Rhône-Alpes
- Coordinates: 46°06′28″N 6°16′05″E
- Country: France
- Region: Auvergne-Rhône-Alpes
- Department: Haute-Savoie
- Arrondissement: Saint-Julien-en-Genevois
- Canton: La Roche-sur-Foron
- Intercommunality: Arve et Salève

Government
  - Mayor (2020–2026): Isabelle Roguet
- Area^{1}: 18.68 km^{2} (7.21 sq mi)
- Highest elevation: 931 m (3,054 ft)
- Lowest elevation: 480 m (1,570 ft)
- Population (2023): 3,245
  - Density: 173.7/km^{2} (449.9/sq mi)
- Time zone: UTC+01:00 (CET)
  - Summer (DST): UTC+02:00 (CEST)
- INSEE/Postal code: 74211 /74930
- ^{1} French Land Register data, which excludes lakes, ponds, glaciers > 1 km^{2} (0.386 sq mi or 247 acres) and river estuaries.

Pers-Jussy (Savoyard: Pè-Dyèssi) is a commune in the Haute-Savoie department and Auvergne-Rhône-Alpes region of eastern France.

== Population ==
Historical population
| Year | Pop. | ±% p.a. |
|---|---|---|
| 1968 | 1,056 | — |
| 1975 | 1,114 | +0.77% |
| 1982 | 1,435 | +3.68% |
| 1990 | 1,800 | +2.87% |
| 1999 | 2,105 | +1.75% |
| 2007 | 2,473 | +2.03% |
| 2012 | 2,734 | +2.03% |
| 2017 | 3,052 | +2.23% |
| 2023 | 3,245 | +1.03% |
Source: INSEE

== See also ==
- Communes of the Haute-Savoie department
