= Gasparino Barzizza =

Italian Renaissance humanist (c. 1360–1431)

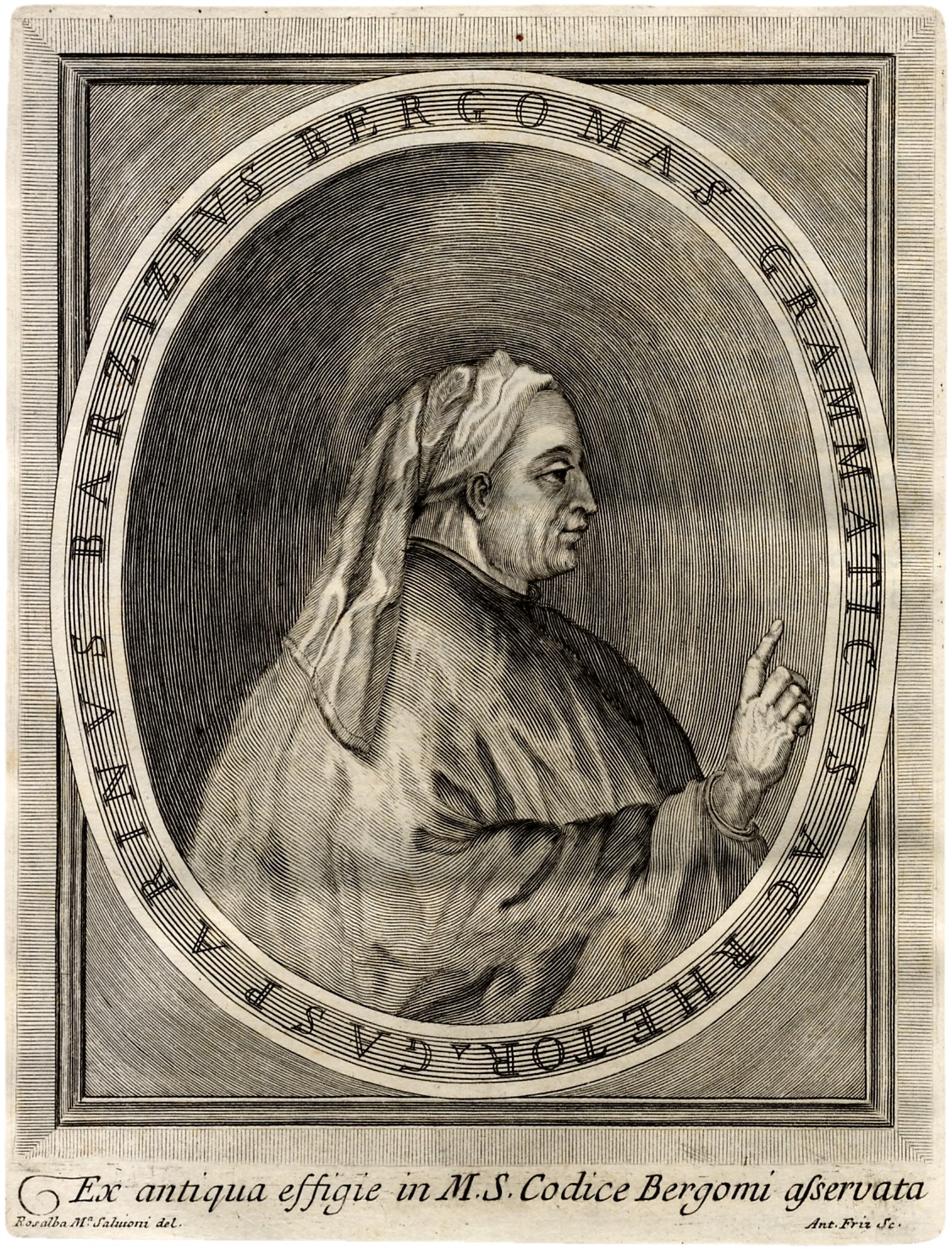
Portrait of Gasparino Barzizza, designed by Rosalba Maria Salvioni, engraved by Anton Fritz.

The first book printed in France: Epistolae ("Letters"), by Gasparino Barzizza. It was printed in 1470 by the press established by Johann Heynlin.

Gasparino Barzizza (in French, Gasparin de Bergame; in Latin, Gasparinus Barzizius Bergomensis or Pergamensis) (c. 1360 – 1431) was an Italian grammarian and teacher noted for introducing a new style of epistolary Latin inspired by the works of Cicero.

With Pier Paolo Vergerio the Elder, he was influential in the development of humanism at Padua. As one of the first Italian Humanists, he taught rhetoric, grammar, and moral philosophy with the aim of reviving Latin literature.

== Biography ==
Born Gasparino di Pietrobuono in the village of Barzizza, near Bergamo, he studied grammar and rhetoric at Pavia. Remaining there to teach from 1403 to 1407, he subsequently moved to Venice to serve as private tutor to the Barbaro family. His nephew was Antonio Barzizza.

Unable to find backing in Venice in order to establish a school there, Gasparino then taught at Padua (1407–21), enjoying his most productive writing period, where his reputation as a teacher and scholar was established. He was appointed to lecture there on rhetoric and on authors such as Seneca, Cicero, Virgil, and Terence. He also established the elementary school, which offered a humanist curriculum. Both Vittorino da Feltre and Leon Battista Alberti owed their boyhood education to him. Antonio Beccadelli, called "Il Panormita", also studied under him. Other famous students include Francesco Filelfo and Stefano Fieschi.

He then taught at Ferrara, and on the invitation of Filippo Maria Visconti, opened an elementary school at Milan in 1418, to be organized along the same lines as Gasparino's school at Padua. He taught at Milan from 1421 and also served as Visconti's court orator.

Gasparino also served as secretary to Pope Martin V and in this capacity attended the Council of Constance. Gasparino died at Milan around 1431, after which Lorenzo Valla succeeded him as chair of rhetoric in Pavia.

By his marriage to Lucrezia Alliardi, Gasparino had a son, named Guimforte (Guiniforto) Barzizza (c. 1406–63), who became a distinguished scholar and writer. Guimforte married Giovannina Malabarba.

== Works ==
- Epistolarum liber ("Book of Letters") or Epistolae ("Letters"): his most famous work, which carries the distinction of being the first book printed in France (Paris), in 1470, with the newly introduced printing press by Johann Heynlin. This work was intended to provide an exemplar for students for the writing of artful and elegant Latin and was designed to teach prose composition.
- Epistolae ad exercitatem accommodatae.
- Tractatus de compositione (ca. 1420): a treatise on rhetoric and literary style. In this treatise, Gasparino argued for a return to the elements of style found in the rhetoricians of antiquity.
- De eloquentia opusculum perutile ad oratores grammaticosque.
- Exempla exordiorum.
- Summa praeceptorum ad eam partem compositiones.
- De imitatione.
- Orthographia: a manual of Latin orthography, his most important work.
- possibly the Synonyma Ciceronis ("Synonyms of Cicero"): a collection of synonymous terms used in the rhetorical works of Cicero, produced to aid in the expansion of students' rhetorical vocabulary in Latin.

== Sources ==
- Un altro codice col commento di Barzizza alle ad Lucilium (in Italian)
- Philology and linguistics (in Italian)
- The Classical Renaissance (in English)
- Miscellany of Humanistic Texts (in Italian)
- Palazzo Barzizza (in Italian)
