= Saint-Pierre-en-Faucigny =

Saint-Pierre-en-Faucigny Rmiyi (Savoyard)
- Commune
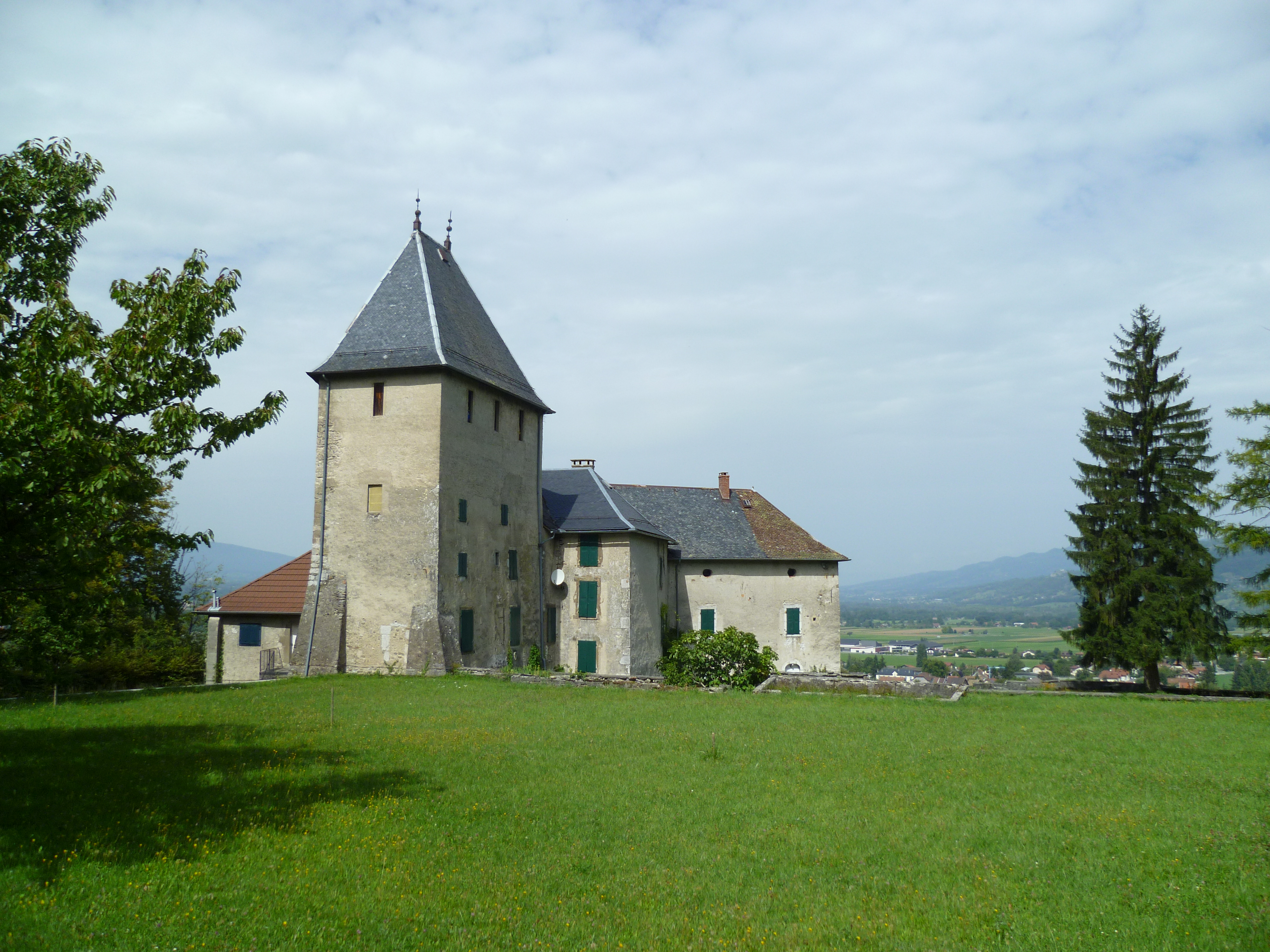
- A view of the Château de Rumilly-sous-Cornillon, in Saint-Pierre-en-Faucigny

- Coat of arms
- Location of Saint-Pierre-en-Faucigny
- Location within France Location within Auvergne-Rhône-Alpes
- Coordinates: 46°03′38″N 6°22′23″E
- Country: France
- Region: Auvergne-Rhône-Alpes
- Department: Haute-Savoie
- Arrondissement: Bonneville
- Canton: Bonneville
- Intercommunality: CC du Pays Rochois

Government
  - Mayor (2020–2026): Marin Gaillard
- Area^{1}: 14.91 km^{2} (5.76 sq mi)
- Highest elevation: 1,500 m (4,900 ft)
- Lowest elevation: 433 m (1,421 ft)
- Population (2023): 7,865
  - Density: 527.5/km^{2} (1,366/sq mi)
- Demonym: Saint-Pierrois / Saint-Pierroise
- Time zone: UTC+01:00 (CET)
  - Summer (DST): UTC+02:00 (CEST)
- INSEE/Postal code: 74250 /74800
- ^{1} French Land Register data, which excludes lakes, ponds, glaciers > 1 km^{2} (0.386 sq mi or 247 acres) and river estuaries.

Saint-Pierre-en-Faucigny (French pronunciation: [sɛ̃ pjɛʁ ɑ̃ fosiɲi]; Savoyard: Rmiyi) is a commune in the Haute-Savoie department in the Auvergne-Rhône-Alpes region in Eastern France.

It is located in the historical province of Faucigny in Savoy hence its name. The town was born from the fusion in 1965 of the communes of Passeirier, Saint-Maurice-de-Rumilly and Saint-Pierre-de-Rumilly.

Saint-Pierre-en-Faucigny is situated between Bonneville just to the east and La Roche-sur-Foron to the west.

== Demographics ==
Historical population
Year	Pop.	±% p.a.
1968	2,468	—
1975	2,701	+1.30%
1982	3,088	+1.93%
1990	3,787	+2.58%
1999	5,053	+3.26%
2007	5,727	+1.58%
2012	5,903	+0.61%
2017	6,573	+2.17%
2023	7,865	+3.04%
Source: INSEE

== Transport ==
The commune has a railway station, Saint-Pierre-en-Faucigny, on the La Roche-sur-Foron–Saint-Gervais-les-Bains-Le Fayet line.

== Twin towns ==
Saint-Pierre-en-Faucigny is twinned with Saint-Pierre, Aosta Valley, Italy.

== See also ==
- Communes of the Haute-Savoie department
