= Demi-Quartier =

Demi-Quartier Dèmi-Kartî (Savoyard)
- Commune
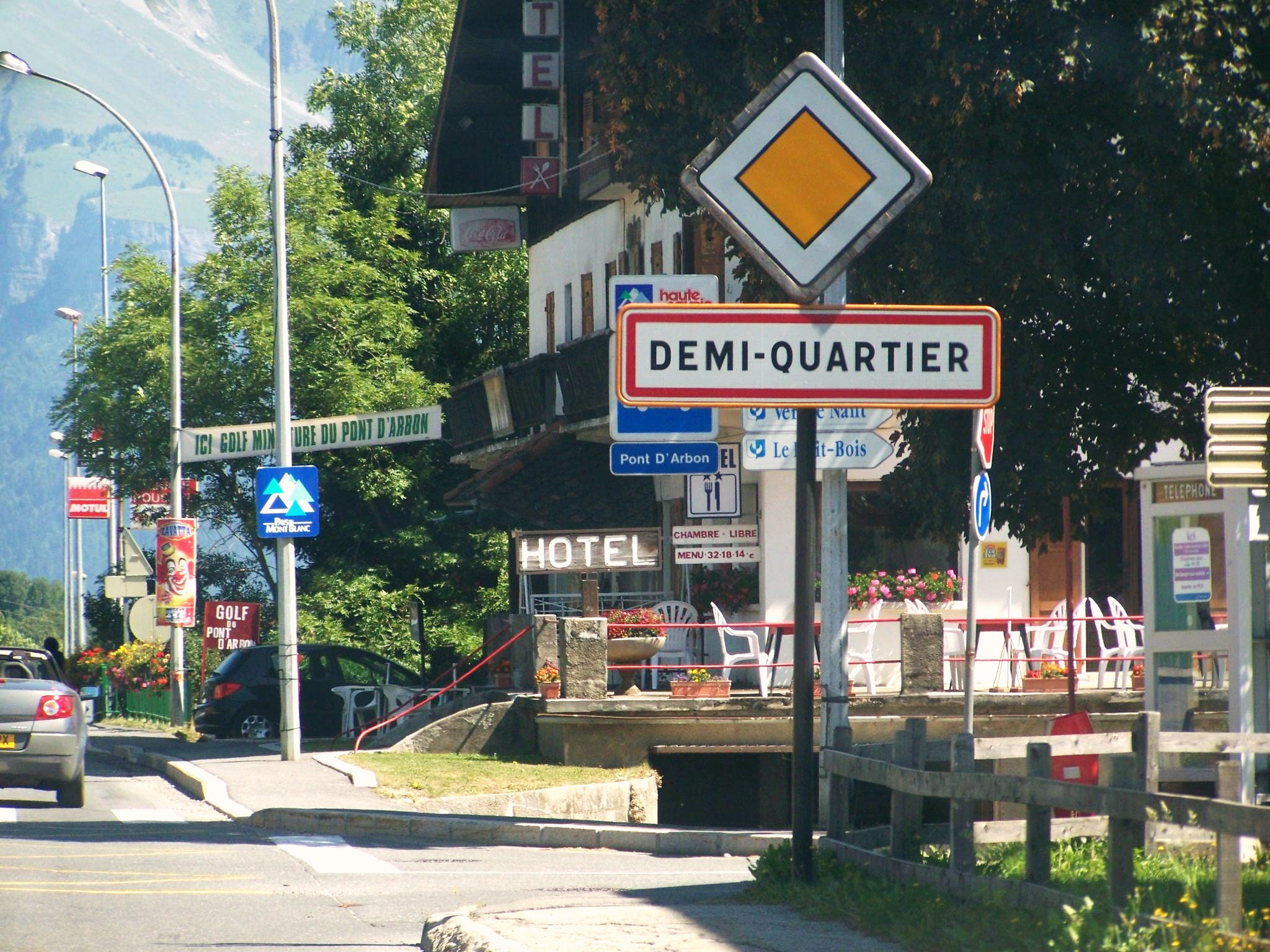
- The road into Demi-Quartier

- Coat of arms
- Location of Demi-Quartier
- Location within France Location within Auvergne-Rhône-Alpes
- Coordinates: 45°51′26″N 6°37′07″E
- Country: France
- Region: Auvergne-Rhône-Alpes
- Department: Haute-Savoie
- Arrondissement: Bonneville
- Canton: Sallanches
- Intercommunality: Pays du Mont-Blanc

Government
  - Mayor (2020–2026): Stéphane Allard
- Area^{1}: 8.9 km^{2} (3.4 sq mi)
- Highest elevation: 1,780 m (5,840 ft)
- Lowest elevation: 1,037 m (3,402 ft)
- Population (2023): 801
  - Density: 90/km^{2} (230/sq mi)
- Time zone: UTC+01:00 (CET)
  - Summer (DST): UTC+02:00 (CEST)
- INSEE/Postal code: 74099 /74120
- ^{1} French Land Register data, which excludes lakes, ponds, glaciers > 1 km^{2} (0.386 sq mi or 247 acres) and river estuaries.

Demi-Quartier (French pronunciation: [dəmi kaʁtje]; Savoyard: Dèmi-Kartî) is a commune in the Haute-Savoie department in the Auvergne-Rhône-Alpes region in south-eastern France. It is part of the urban area of Sallanches.

== See also ==
- Communes of the Haute-Savoie department
