= Saint-Pierre-en-Faucigny station =

Railway station in Saint-Pierre-en-Faucigny, France

Saint-Pierre-en-Faucigny
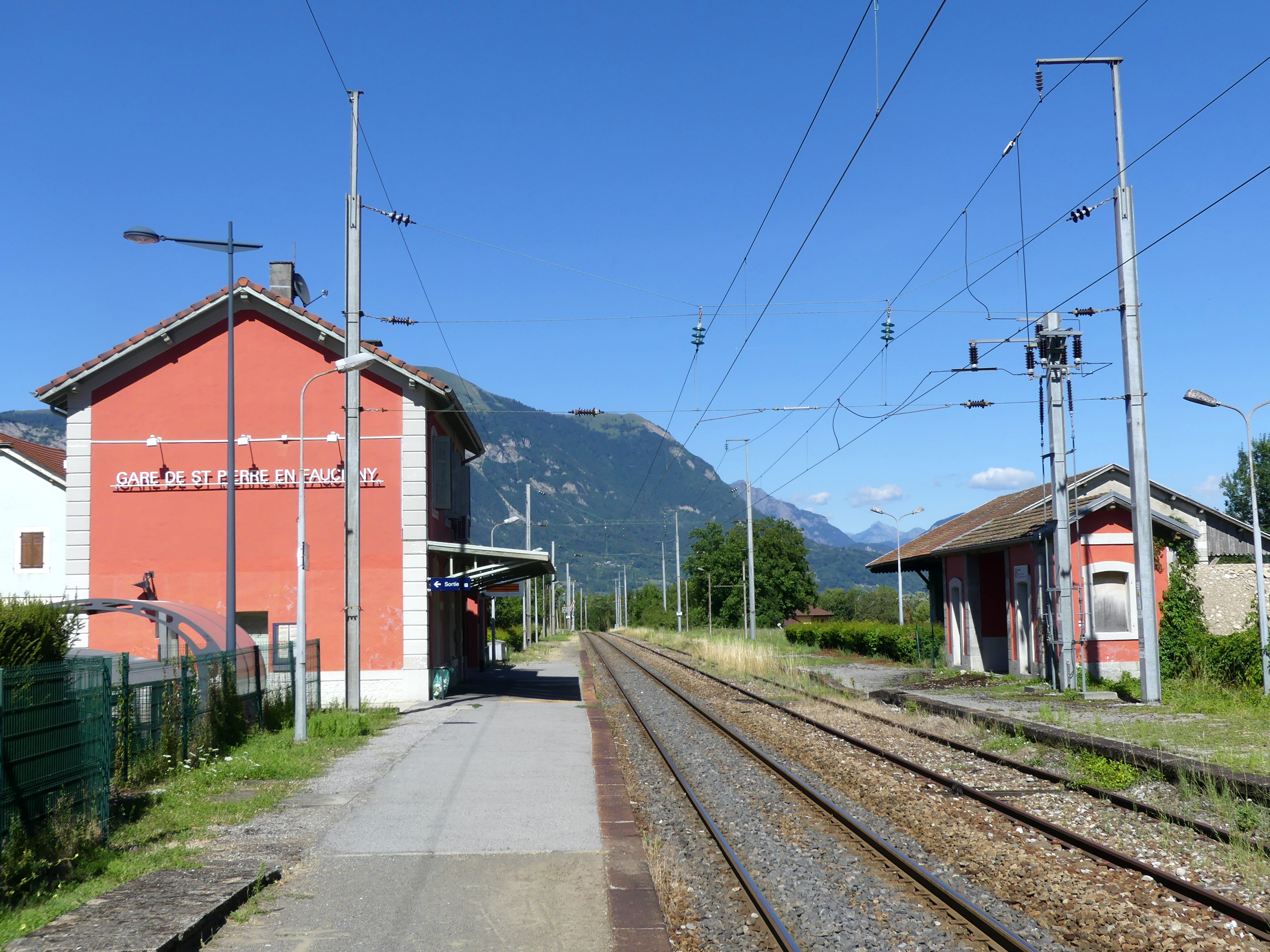
- The station in 2017

General information
- Location: Saint-Pierre-en-Faucigny; France
- Coordinates: 46°03′34″N 6°22′33″E
- Elevation: 477 m (1,565 ft)
- Owner: SNCF
- Line: La Roche-sur-Foron–Saint-Gervais-les-Bains-Le Fayet line
- Distance: 6.2 km (3.9 mi) from La Roche-sur-Foron
- Train operators: TER Auvergne-Rhône-Alpes
- Connections: Proxim'iTi bus lines

Passengers
- 2019: 75,269 (SNCF)

Services
Preceding station	TER Auvergne-Rhône-Alpes	Following station
La Roche-sur-Foron towards Lyon-Part-Dieu	3	Bonneville towards Saint-Gervais
La Roche-sur-Foron towards Annecy	43	Bonneville towards Saint-Gervais
Preceding station	Léman Express	Following station
La Roche-sur-Foron towards Coppet	L3	Bonneville towards Saint-Gervais
Location
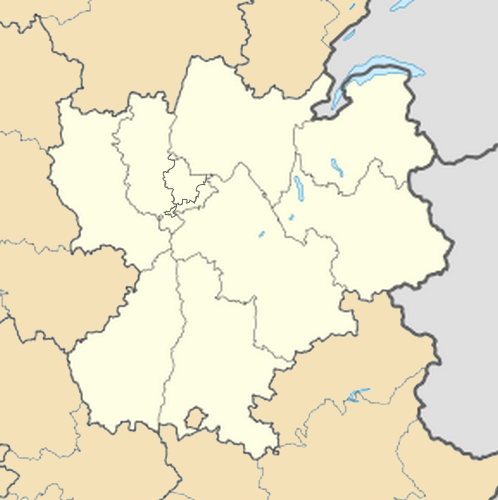
- Location within Auvergne-Rhône-Alpes Location within Rhône-Alpes Location within France

Saint-Pierre-en-Faucigny station (French: Gare de Saint-Pierre-en-Faucigny) is a railway station in the commune of Saint-Pierre-en-Faucigny, in the French department of Haute-Savoie. It is located on the standard gauge La Roche-sur-Foron–Saint-Gervais-les-Bains-Le Fayet line of SNCF.

== Services ==
As of the December 2020 timetable change, the following services stop at Saint-Pierre-en-Faucigny:

- Léman Express L3 / TER Auvergne-Rhône-Alpes: hourly service between Annemasse and Saint-Gervais-les-Bains-Le Fayet and every two hours from Annemasse to Coppet.
- TER Auvergne-Rhône-Alpes: rush-hour service between Annecy and Saint-Gervais-les-Bains-Le Fayet.
