= Magland station =

Railway station in Magland, France

Magland
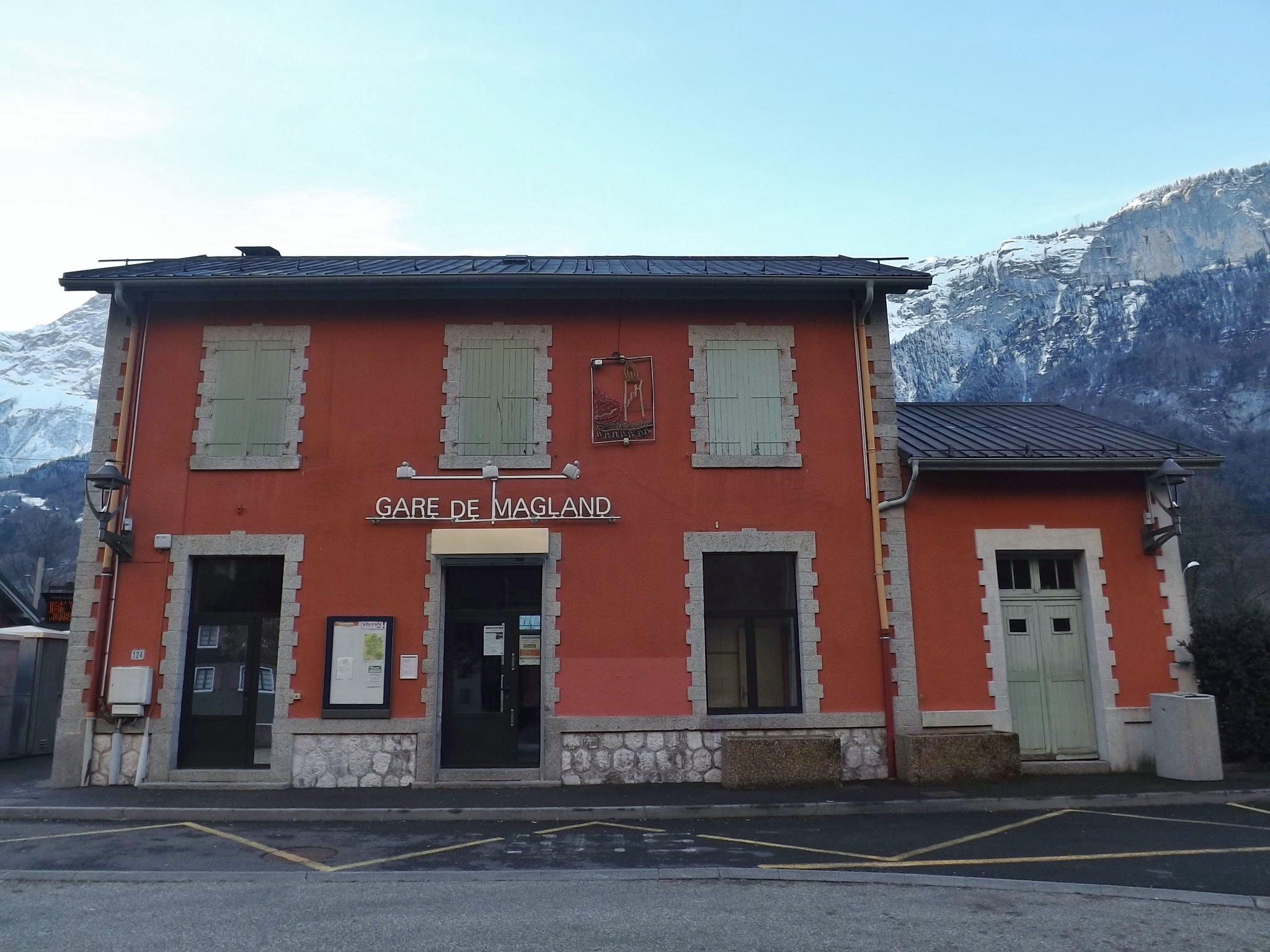
- The station building in 2013

General information
- Location: Magland; France
- Coordinates: 46°01′01″N 6°37′17″E
- Elevation: 506 m (1,660 ft)
- Owner: SNCF
- Line: La Roche-sur-Foron–Saint-Gervais-les-Bains-Le Fayet line
- Distance: 31.4 km (19.5 mi) from La Roche-sur-Foron
- Train operators: TER Auvergne-Rhône-Alpes

Passengers
- 2019: 24,673 (SNCF)

Services
Preceding station	TER Auvergne-Rhône-Alpes	Following station
Cluses towards Lyon-Part-Dieu	3	Sallanches-Combloux-Megève towards Saint-Gervais
Cluses towards Annecy	43	Sallanches-Combloux-Megève towards Saint-Gervais
Preceding station	Léman Express	Following station
Cluses towards Coppet	L3	Sallanches-Combloux-Megève towards Saint-Gervais
Location
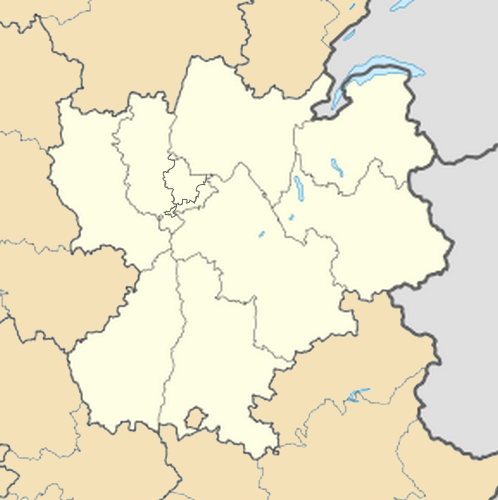
- Location within Auvergne-Rhône-Alpes Location within Rhône-Alpes Location within France

Magland station (French: Gare de Magland) is a railway station in the commune of Magland, in the French department of Haute-Savoie. It is located on the standard gauge La Roche-sur-Foron–Saint-Gervais-les-Bains-Le Fayet line of SNCF.

== Services ==
As of the December 2020 timetable change, the following services stop at Magland:

- Léman Express L3 / TER Auvergne-Rhône-Alpes: hourly service between Annemasse and Saint-Gervais-les-Bains-Le Fayet and every two hours from Annemasse to Coppet.
- TER Auvergne-Rhône-Alpes: rush-hour service between Annecy and Saint-Gervais-les-Bains-Le Fayet.
