= Cluses station =

Railway station in France

Cluses
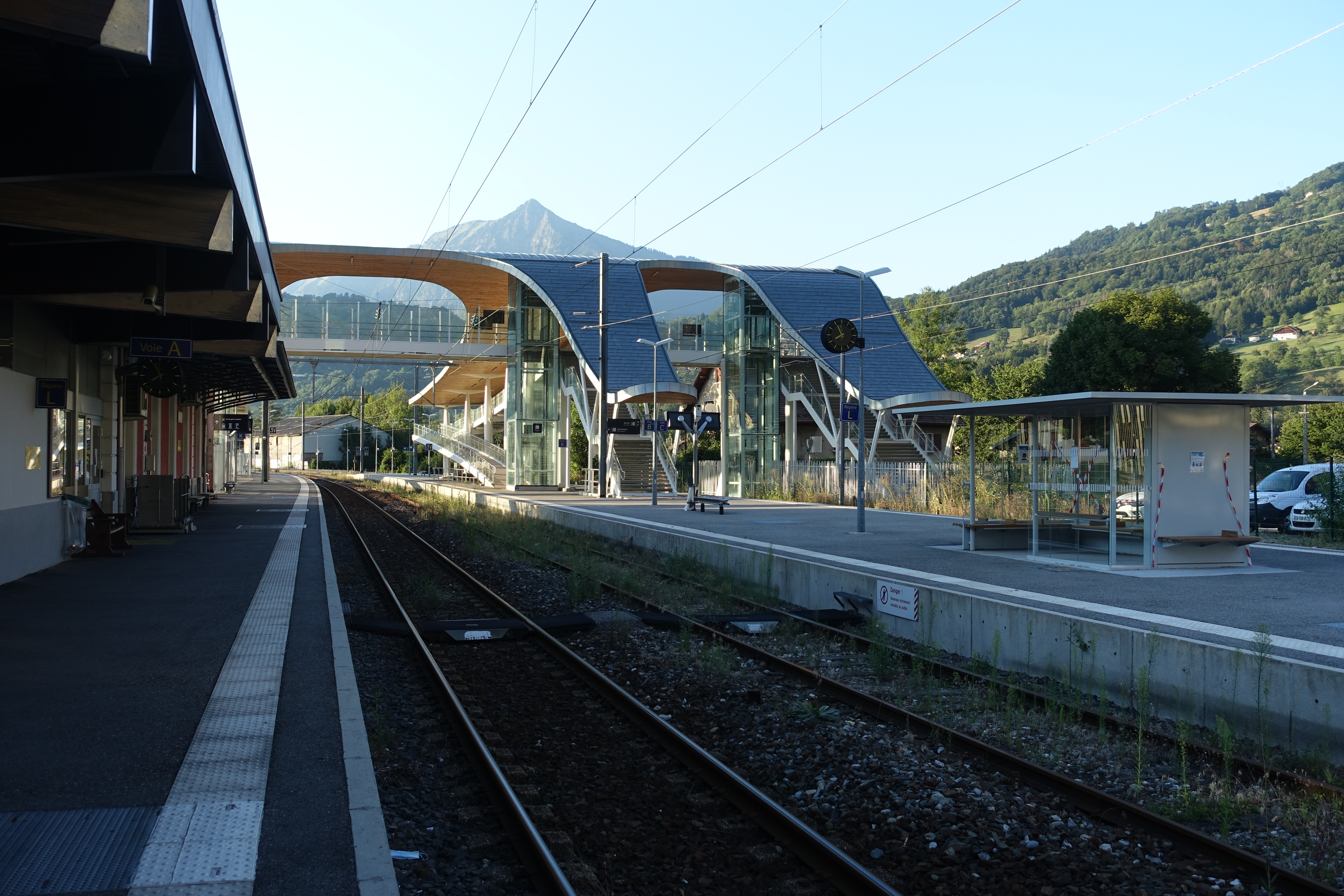
- The station platforms in 2020

General information
- Location: Cluses; France
- Coordinates: 46°03′41″N 6°34′58″E
- Elevation: 484 m (1,588 ft)
- Owner: SNCF
- Line: La Roche-sur-Foron–Saint-Gervais-les-Bains-Le Fayet line
- Distance: 24.6 km (15.3 mi) from La Roche-sur-Foron
- Train operators: SNCF; TER Auvergne-Rhône-Alpes
- Connections: Arv'i and Cars Région Haute-Savoie bus lines

History
- Opened: 1 June 1890

Passengers
- 2019: 488,615 (SNCF)

Services
Preceding station	SNCF	Following station
Annemasse towards Paris-Lyon	TGV inOui Seasonal service	Sallanches-Combloux-Megève towards Saint-Gervais
Preceding station	TER Auvergne-Rhône-Alpes	Following station
Marignier towards Lyon-Part-Dieu	3	Magland towards Saint-Gervais
Marignier towards Annecy	43	Magland towards Saint-Gervais
Preceding station	Léman Express	Following station
Marignier towards Coppet	L3	Magland towards Saint-Gervais
Location
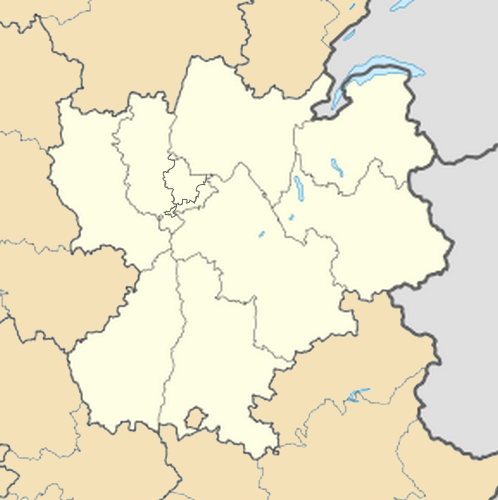
- Location within Auvergne-Rhône-Alpes Location within Rhône-Alpes Location within France

Cluses station (French: Gare de Cluses) is a railway station in the commune of Cluses, in the French department of Haute-Savoie. It is located on the standard gauge La Roche-sur-Foron–Saint-Gervais-les-Bains-Le Fayet line of SNCF.

== Services ==
As of the December 2020 timetable change, the following services stop at Cluses:

- TGV inOui: on weekends during the winter season, two round-trips per day between Paris-Lyon and Saint-Gervais-les-Bains-Le Fayet.
- Léman Express L3 / TER Auvergne-Rhône-Alpes: hourly service between Annemasse and Saint-Gervais-les-Bains-Le Fayet and every two hours from Annemasse to Coppet.
- TER Auvergne-Rhône-Alpes: rush-hour service between Annecy and Saint-Gervais-les-Bains-Le Fayet.
