= Praz-sur-Arly =

Praz-sur-Arly Le Prâ (Savoyard)
- Commune
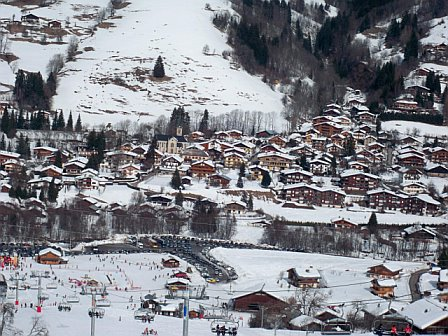
- A general view of Praz-sur-Arly

- Coat of arms
- Location of Praz-sur-Arly
- Location within France Location within Auvergne-Rhône-Alpes
- Coordinates: 45°50′17″N 6°34′15″E
- Country: France
- Region: Auvergne-Rhône-Alpes
- Department: Haute-Savoie
- Arrondissement: Bonneville
- Canton: Sallanches
- Intercommunality: Pays du Mont-Blanc

Government
  - Mayor (2020–2026): Yann Jaccaz
- Area^{1}: 22.64 km^{2} (8.74 sq mi)
- Highest elevation: 2,282 m (7,487 ft)
- Lowest elevation: 980 m (3,220 ft)
- Population (2023): 1,311
  - Density: 57.91/km^{2} (150.0/sq mi)
- Time zone: UTC+01:00 (CET)
  - Summer (DST): UTC+02:00 (CEST)
- INSEE/Postal code: 74215 /74120
- ^{1} French Land Register data, which excludes lakes, ponds, glaciers > 1 km^{2} (0.386 sq mi or 247 acres) and river estuaries.

Praz-sur-Arly (French pronunciation: [pʁa syʁ aʁli], literally Praz on Arly; Savoyard: Le Prâ) is a commune in the Haute-Savoie department in the Auvergne-Rhône-Alpes region in south-eastern France. It is part of the urban area of Sallanches.

The local people are called "Pralins" for men, and "Pralines" for women.

The village is twinned with the town of Roscoff, in Brittany.

== Geography ==
The village of Praz-sur-Arly is 1,035 metres above sea level, in Val d'Arly, between Megève and Flumet. The river Arly goes through the village as do the rivers Cassioz and Varins.

== See also ==
- Communes of the Haute-Savoie department
