= Sallanches–Combloux–Megève station =

Railway station in Sallanches, France

Sallanches–Combloux–Megève
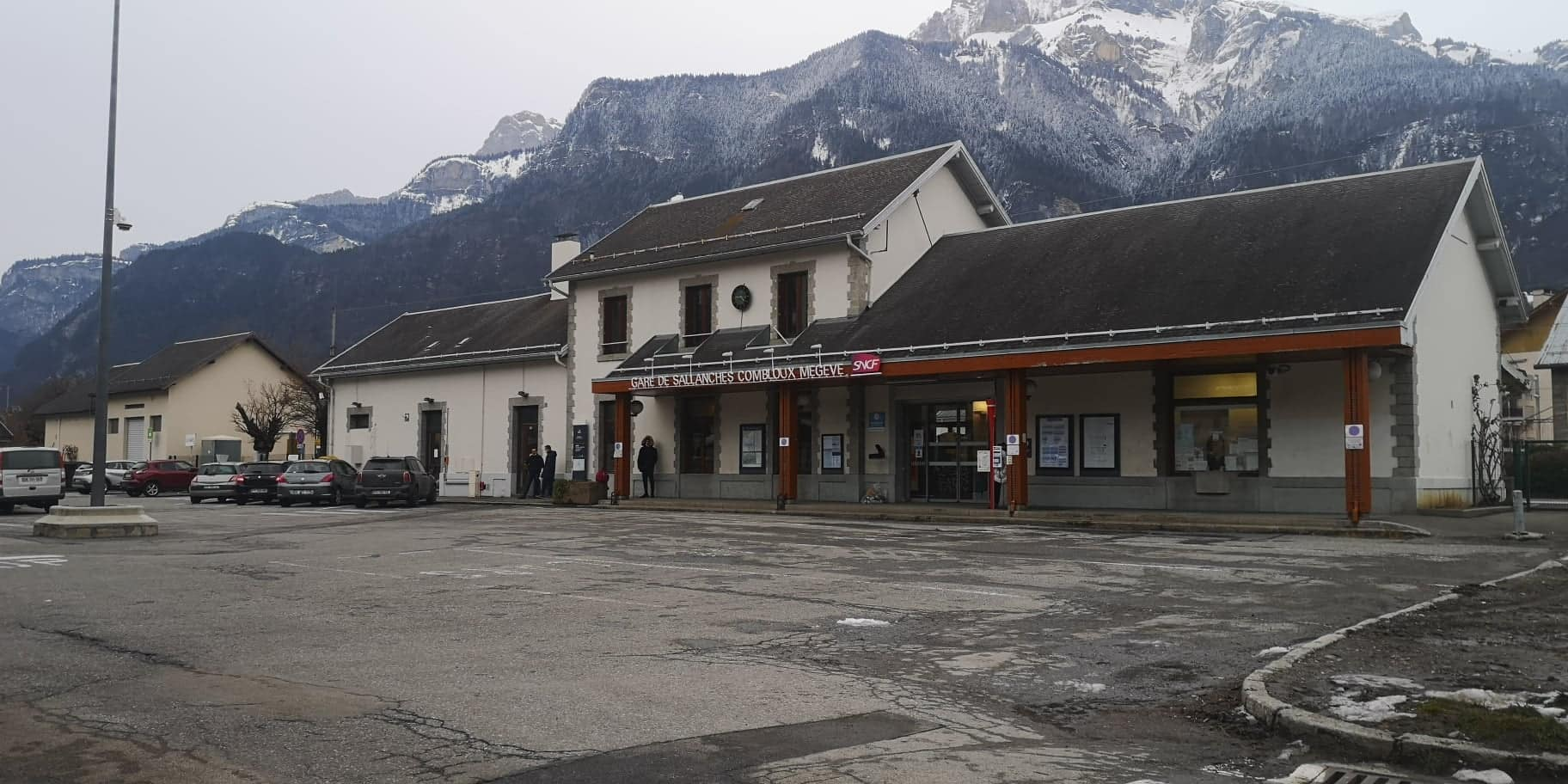
- The station building in 2021

General information
- Location: Sallanches; France
- Coordinates: 45°56′09″N 6°38′11″E
- Elevation: 546 m (1,791 ft)
- Owner: SNCF
- Line: La Roche-sur-Foron–Saint-Gervais-les-Bains-Le Fayet line
- Distance: 40.0 km (24.9 mi) from La Roche-sur-Foron
- Train operators: SNCF; TER Auvergne-Rhône-Alpes
- Connections: Cars Région Haute-Savoie bus lines

Passengers
- 2019: 347,272 (SNCF)

Services
Preceding station	SNCF	Following station
Cluses towards Paris-Lyon	TGV inOui Seasonal service	Saint-Gervais Terminus
Preceding station	TER Auvergne-Rhône-Alpes	Following station
Magland towards Lyon-Part-Dieu	3	Saint-Gervais Terminus
Magland towards Annecy	43	Saint-Gervais Terminus
Preceding station	Léman Express	Following station
Magland towards Coppet	L3	Saint-Gervais Terminus
Location
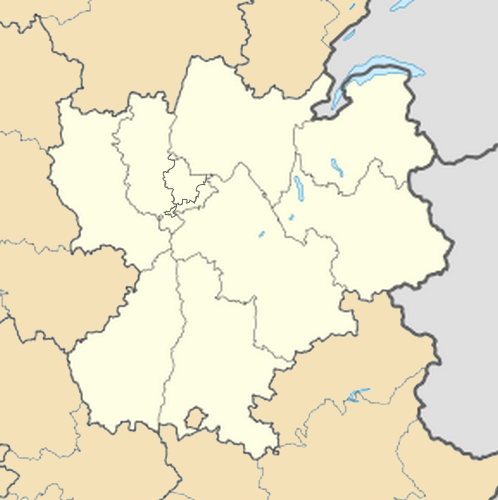
- Location within Auvergne-Rhône-Alpes Location within Rhône-Alpes Location within France

Sallanches–Combloux–Megève station (French: Gare de Sallanches–Combloux–Megève) is a railway station in the commune of Sallanches, in the French department of Haute-Savoie. It is located on the standard gauge La Roche-sur-Foron–Saint-Gervais-les-Bains-Le Fayet line of SNCF. Connections from the station exist via Cars Région Haute-Savoie bus lines.

== Services ==
As of the December 2020 timetable change, the following services were stopping at Sallanches-Combloux-Megève:

- TGV inOui: on weekends during the winter season, two round-trips per day between Paris-Lyon and Saint-Gervais-les-Bains-Le Fayet.
- Léman Express L3 / TER Auvergne-Rhône-Alpes: hourly service between Annemasse and Saint-Gervais-les-Bains-Le Fayet and every two hours from Annemasse to Coppet.
- TER Auvergne-Rhône-Alpes: rush-hour service between Annecy and Saint-Gervais-les-Bains-Le Fayet.
