= Magland =

Magland Magyan (Savoyard)
- Commune
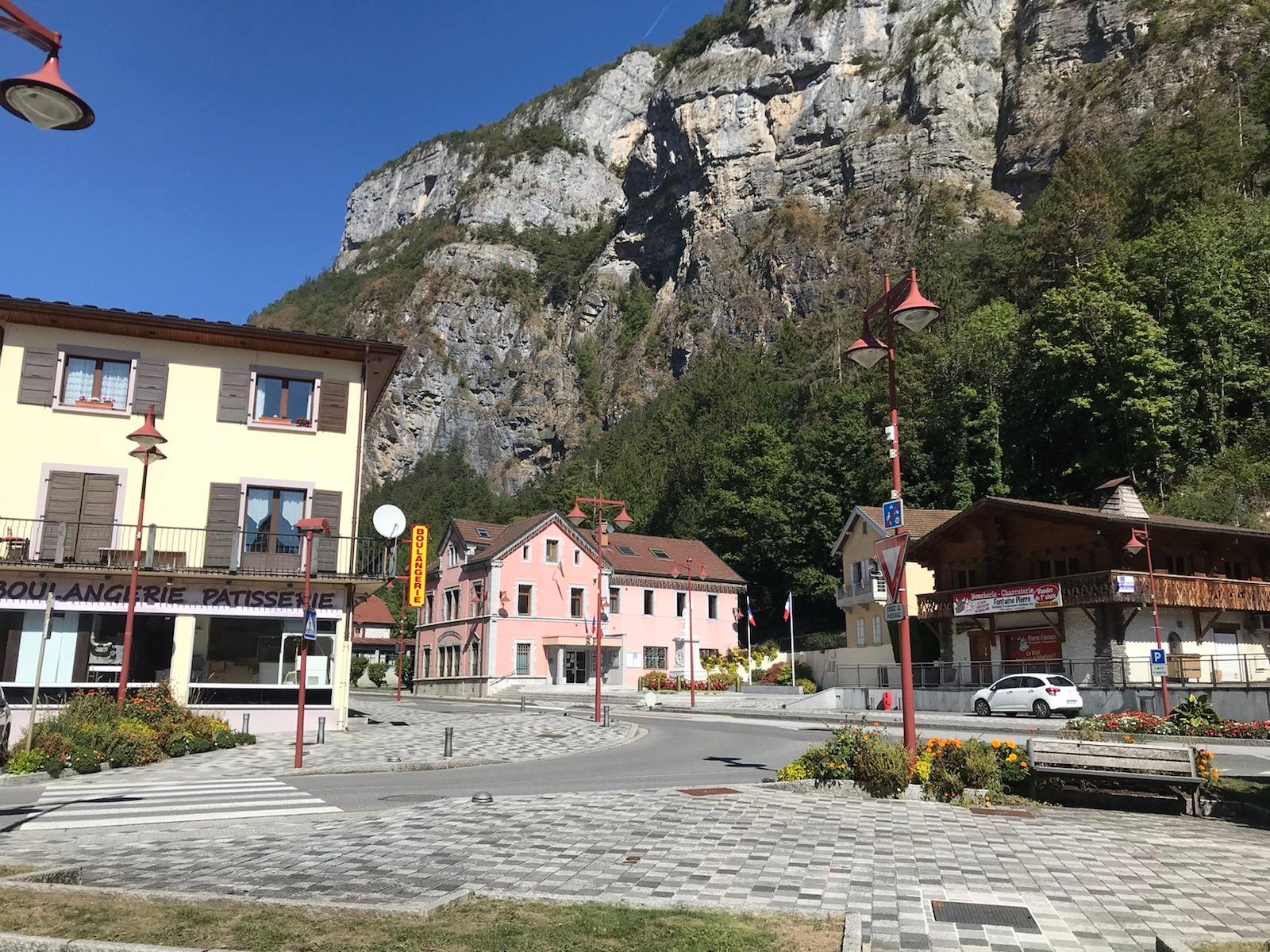
- Magland town centre.

- Coat of arms
- Location of Magland
- Location within France Location within Auvergne-Rhône-Alpes
- Coordinates: 46°01′22″N 6°37′14″E
- Country: France
- Region: Auvergne-Rhône-Alpes
- Department: Haute-Savoie
- Arrondissement: Bonneville
- Canton: Sallanches
- Intercommunality: CC Cluses-Arve et Montagnes

Government
  - Mayor (2020–2026): Johann Ravailler
- Area^{1}: 40.32 km^{2} (15.57 sq mi)
- Highest elevation: 2,649 m (8,691 ft)
- Lowest elevation: 483 m (1,585 ft)
- Population (2023): 3,220
  - Density: 79.9/km^{2} (207/sq mi)
- Time zone: UTC+01:00 (CET)
  - Summer (DST): UTC+02:00 (CEST)
- INSEE/Postal code: 74159 /74300
- Website: Official website
- ^{1} French Land Register data, which excludes lakes, ponds, glaciers > 1 km^{2} (0.386 sq mi or 247 acres) and river estuaries.

Magland (French pronunciation: [maɡlɑ̃]; Savoyard: Magyan) is a commune in the Haute-Savoie department in the Auvergne-Rhône-Alpes region in south-eastern France.

== Geography ==
Magland is in the Vallée de l'Arve, between Cluses and Sallanches. There are several hamlets like Gravin, Balme, Oëx and Luth. It is part of the canton of Sallanches.

== Transport ==
The commune has a railway station, Magland, on the La Roche-sur-Foron–Saint-Gervais-les-Bains-Le Fayet line.

== Population ==
Historical population
Year	Pop.	±% p.a.
1968	2,168	—
1975	2,232	+0.42%
1982	2,630	+2.37%
1990	2,861	+1.06%
1999	2,801	−0.24%
2007	2,961	+0.70%
2012	3,202	+1.58%
2017	3,279	+0.48%
2023	3,220	−0.30%
Source: INSEE

== Education ==
There are four schools in Magland: the primary school of the Chef-Lieu, of the Gravin, of the Moranche and a nursery school.

== See also ==
- Flaine
- Communes of the Haute-Savoie department

== Twin towns ==
- Barzio, Italy
