= Marignier station =

Railway station in Marignier, France

Marignier
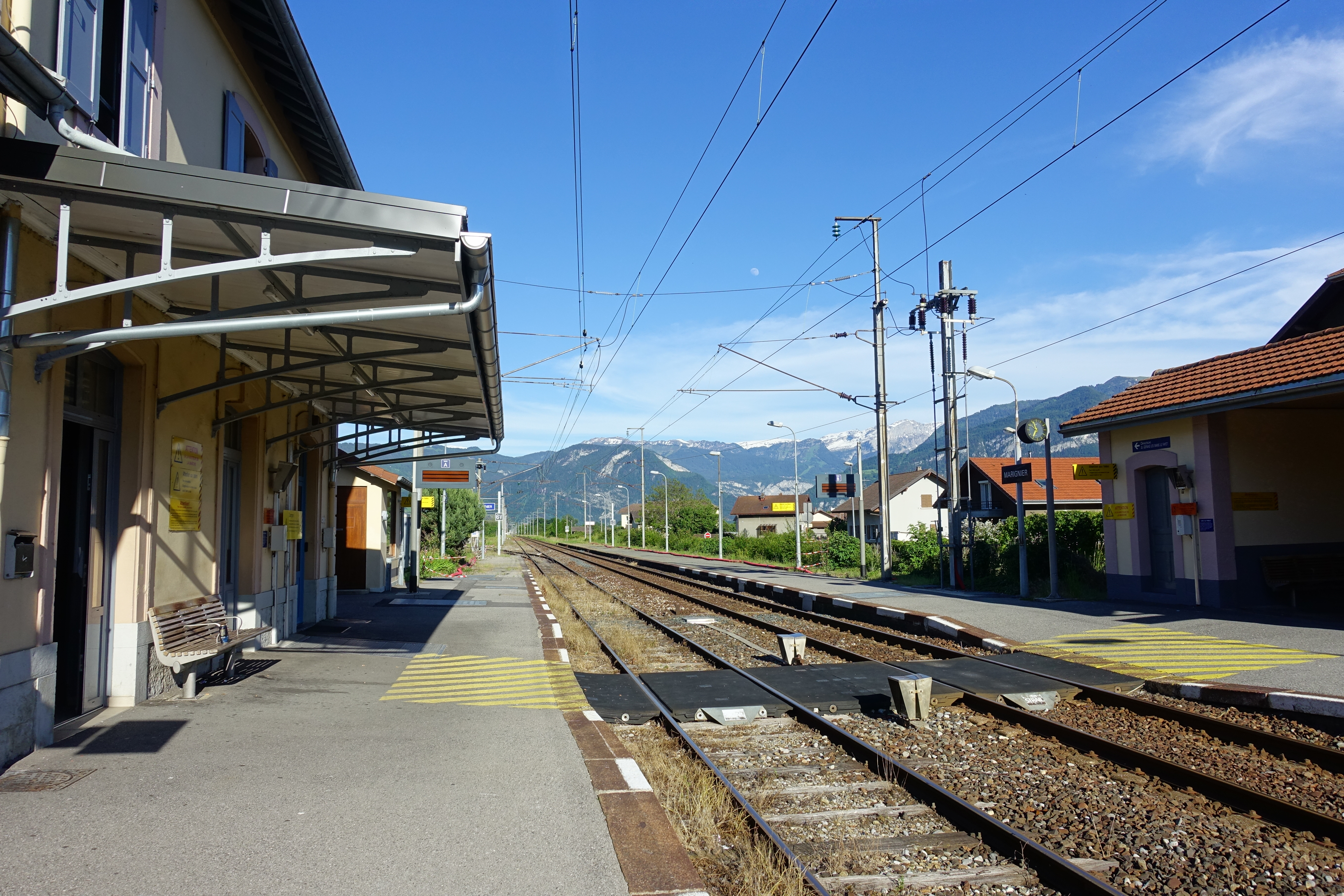
- The station platforms in 2019

General information
- Location: Marignier; France
- Coordinates: 46°05′20″N 6°30′28″E
- Elevation: 474 m (1,555 ft)
- Owner: SNCF
- Line: La Roche-sur-Foron–Saint-Gervais-les-Bains-Le Fayet line
- Distance: 17.8 km (11.1 mi) from La Roche-sur-Foron
- Train operators: TER Auvergne-Rhône-Alpes
- Connections: Arv'i and Proxim'iTi bus lines

Passengers
- 2019: 146,796 (SNCF)

Services
Preceding station	TER Auvergne-Rhône-Alpes	Following station
Bonneville towards Lyon-Part-Dieu	3	Cluses towards Saint-Gervais
Bonneville towards Annecy	43	Cluses towards Saint-Gervais
Preceding station	Léman Express	Following station
Bonneville towards Coppet	L3	Cluses towards Saint-Gervais
Location
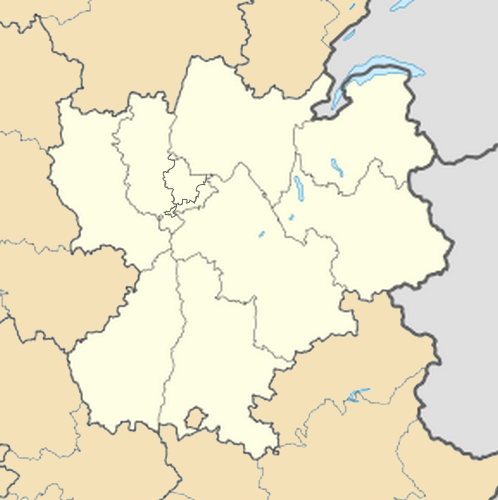
- Location within Auvergne-Rhône-Alpes Location within Rhône-Alpes Location within France

Marignier station (French: Gare de Marignier) is a railway station in the commune of Marignier, in the French department of Haute-Savoie. It is located on the standard gauge La Roche-sur-Foron–Saint-Gervais-les-Bains-Le Fayet line of SNCF.

== Services ==
As of the December 2020 timetable change, the following services stop at Marignier:

- Léman Express L3 / TER Auvergne-Rhône-Alpes: hourly service between Annemasse and Saint-Gervais-les-Bains-Le Fayet and every two hours from Annemasse to Coppet.
- TER Auvergne-Rhône-Alpes: rush-hour service between Annecy and Saint-Gervais-les-Bains-Le Fayet.
