= Bonneville station =

Railway station in the commune of Bonneville

Bonneville
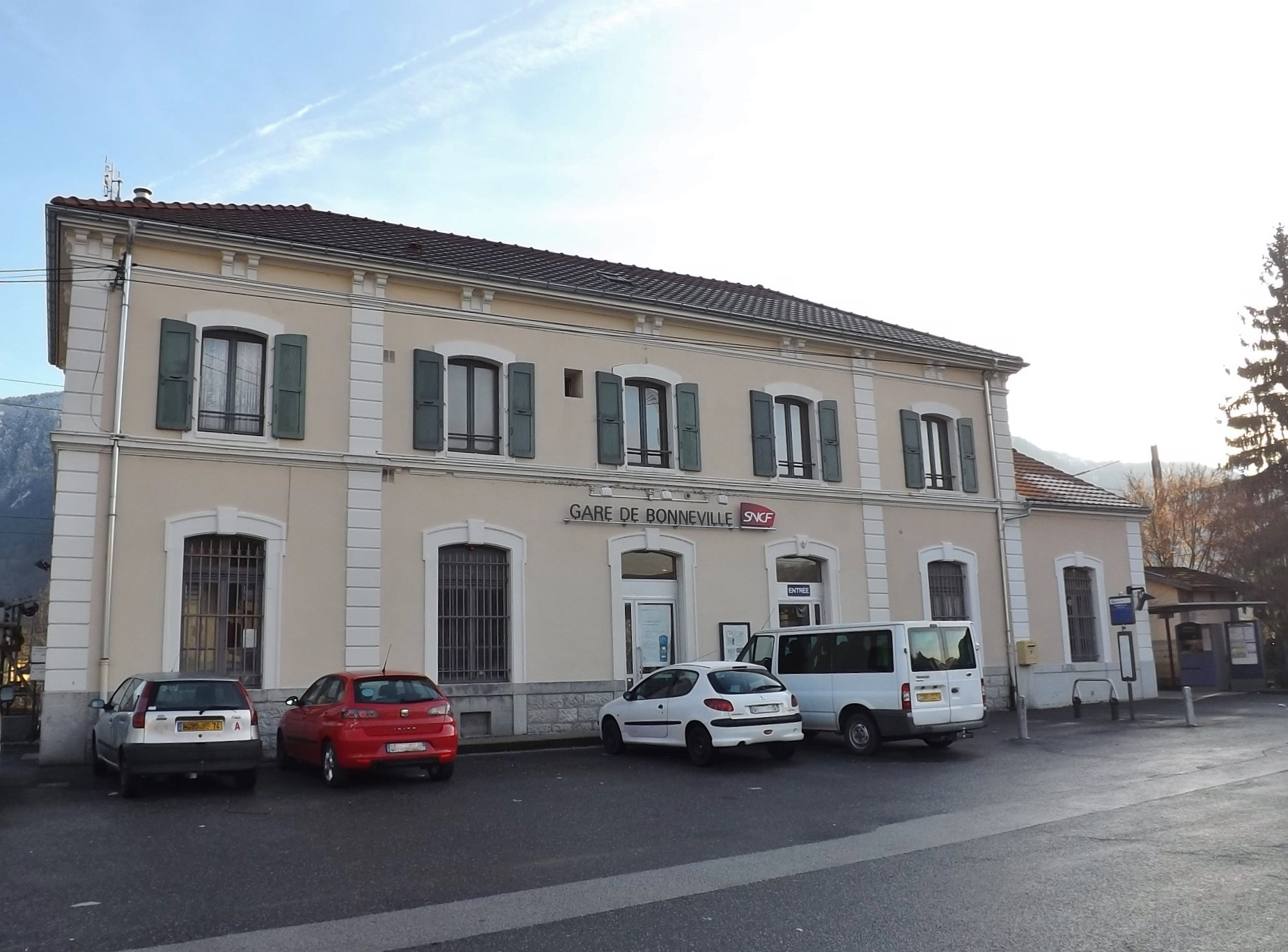
- The station building in 2013

General information
- Location: Bonneville; France
- Coordinates: 46°04′40″N 6°24′59″E
- Elevation: 449 m (1,473 ft)
- Owner: SNCF
- Line: La Roche-sur-Foron–Saint-Gervais-les-Bains-Le Fayet line
- Distance: 10.0 km (6.2 mi) from La Roche-sur-Foron
- Train operators: TER Auvergne-Rhône-Alpes
- Connections: Proxim'iTi bus lines

Passengers
- 2019: 244,862 (SNCF)

Services
Preceding station	TER Auvergne-Rhône-Alpes	Following station
Saint-Pierre-en-Faucigny towards Lyon-Part-Dieu	3	Marignier towards Saint-Gervais
Saint-Pierre-en-Faucigny towards Annecy	43	Marignier towards Saint-Gervais
Preceding station	Léman Express	Following station
Saint-Pierre-en-Faucigny towards Coppet	L3	Marignier towards Saint-Gervais
Location
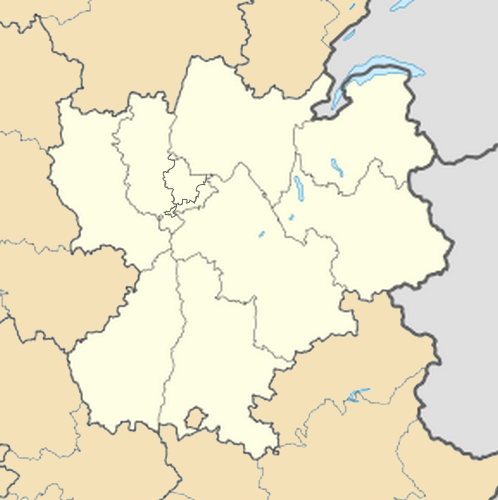
- Location within Auvergne-Rhône-Alpes Location within Rhône-Alpes Location within France

Bonneville station (French: Gare de Bonneville) is a railway station in the commune of Bonneville, in the French department of Haute-Savoie. It is located on the standard gauge La Roche-sur-Foron–Saint-Gervais-les-Bains-Le Fayet line of the SNCF.

== Services ==
As of the December 2020 timetable change, the following services stop at Bonneville:

- Léman Express L3 / TER Auvergne-Rhône-Alpes: hourly service between Annemasse and Saint-Gervais-les-Bains-Le Fayet and every two hours from Annemasse to Coppet.
- TER Auvergne-Rhône-Alpes: rush-hour service between Annecy and Saint-Gervais-les-Bains-Le Fayet.
