= Jocelyne Troccaz =

French roboticist

Jocelyne Troccaz (born 1959) is a French roboticist and researcher in medical imaging and image-guided robotics. She is a director of research for the French National Centre for Scientific Research (CNRS), affiliated with the Computer-Assisted Medical Interventions team (GMCAO) of the Laboratory for Translational Research and Innovation in Medicine and Complexity (TIMC) at Grenoble Alpes University. After originally specializing in industrial applications of robotics, her interests shifted to medical robotics.

== Education and career ==
Troccaz was born on 11 June 1959 in Sallanches, an Alpine town near the French borders with Italy and Switzerland. She studied computer science at the Grenoble Institute of Technology, earned licentiates in 1980 and 1981, a diplôme d'études approfondies (master's degree) in 1982, and a doctorate in 1986. She completed her habilitation in computer science and applied mathematics in 1993.

She joined CNRS in 1988 and became a director of research in 1998, in 2017 being listed as an exceptional-class director of research.

== Recognition ==
Troccaz was named a Fellow of the Medical Image Computing and Computer-Assisted Intervention Society (MICCAI) in 2010, "for scientific contributions to computer-aided surgery and medical robotics and for promotion of the field through involvement in the MICCAI Society and related professional societies". She was named an IEEE Fellow in 2018, "for contributions to robotics and imaging for medical applications".

She was given the Academy Prize of the Académie nationale de chirurgie, and named as a free member of the academy, in 2014. She was given the CNRS Silver Medal in 2015, and named to the Legion of Honour in 2016.

In 2022 she received the MICCAI Society Enduring Impact award and was appointed to the French Academy of Sciences.
