= Sarriod de la Tour Castle =

Castle in the town of Saint-Pierre in Northwestern Italy's Aosta Valley

- Aosta Valley, Italy
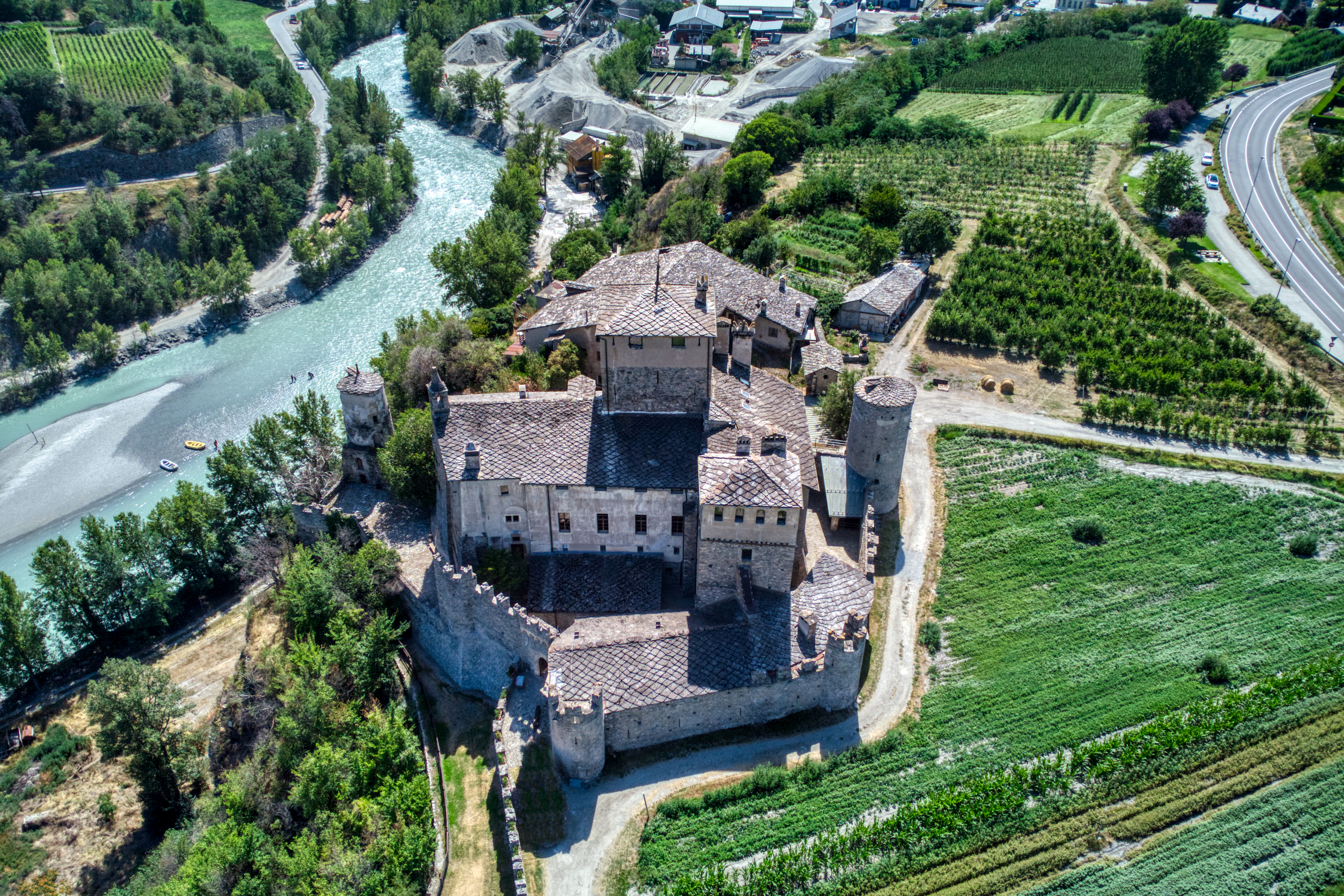
- View of the fortified castle

Site information
- Owner: Aosta Valley Region

Location
- Coordinates: 45°42′22″N 7°13′30″E

Site history
- Built: 10th-12th century
- Built by: Sarriod family

Sarriod de la Tour Castle is a castle in the town of Saint-Pierre by the Dora Baltea River, in Northwestern Italy's Aosta Valley. The original castle was typical of the style built between the 10th and 12th centuries, and was greatly expanded by Jean Sarriod in 1420 and his son, Antoine, in 1478. The north wing's ground floor features a wooden-ceilinged "Hall of Heads", named for its decorative motifs.

== History ==
The Sarriod de la Tour Castle was the family residence of the Sarriod family since its founding. The Sarriods were politically linked to the powerful Bard family in the County of Savoy. The oldest part of the castle included a chapel and square tower, or donjon, surrounded by the castle walls, typical of the Aosta Valley 10th- to 12th-century castles. In 1420 Jean Sarriod expanded upon the "turris Sariodorum", as the donjon was known. The "Hall of Heads", built in 1430, features 171 corbels of grotesques of mythological monsters and animals bearing coats of arms. In 1478 Jean's son, Antoine Sarriod de la Tour, refurbished the chapel dedicated to the Virgin Mary and Saint John the Evangelist, by having painted the external frescoes of the Crucifix and Saint Christopher and caused to be built the small bell tower. The castle wall's circular and semi-circular towers were added sometime in the late 15th century, when a new entrance was created on the eastern side. In the 16th century a west-facing wing was added, then, in the 17th century, a north tower. The Sarriod family inhabited the castle until 1923. In that year the castle went to the Genoese Bensa family. Since 1970, it has been property of the autonomous Region Aosta Valley.

== The castle today ==
There are about 150 medieval castles, towers and fortified houses in the Aosta Valley. The castle is visible from the National Road No. 26 which runs from Ivrea to the Little St Bernard Pass. Sarriod de la Tour is open to visitors year round.
