= Canton of Sallanches =

Administrative District in Haute-Savoie, France

Coordinates: 45.94°N 6.63°E

The canton of Sallanches is an administrative division of the Haute-Savoie department, southeastern France. Its borders were modified at the French canton reorganisation which came into effect in March 2015. Its seat is in Sallanches.

It consists of the following communes:

1. Arâches-la-Frasse
2. Combloux
3. Cordon
4. Demi-Quartier
5. Domancy
6. Magland
7. Megève
8. Praz-sur-Arly
9. Sallanches
