= Sallanches =

Sallanches Salenches (Savoyard)
- Commune
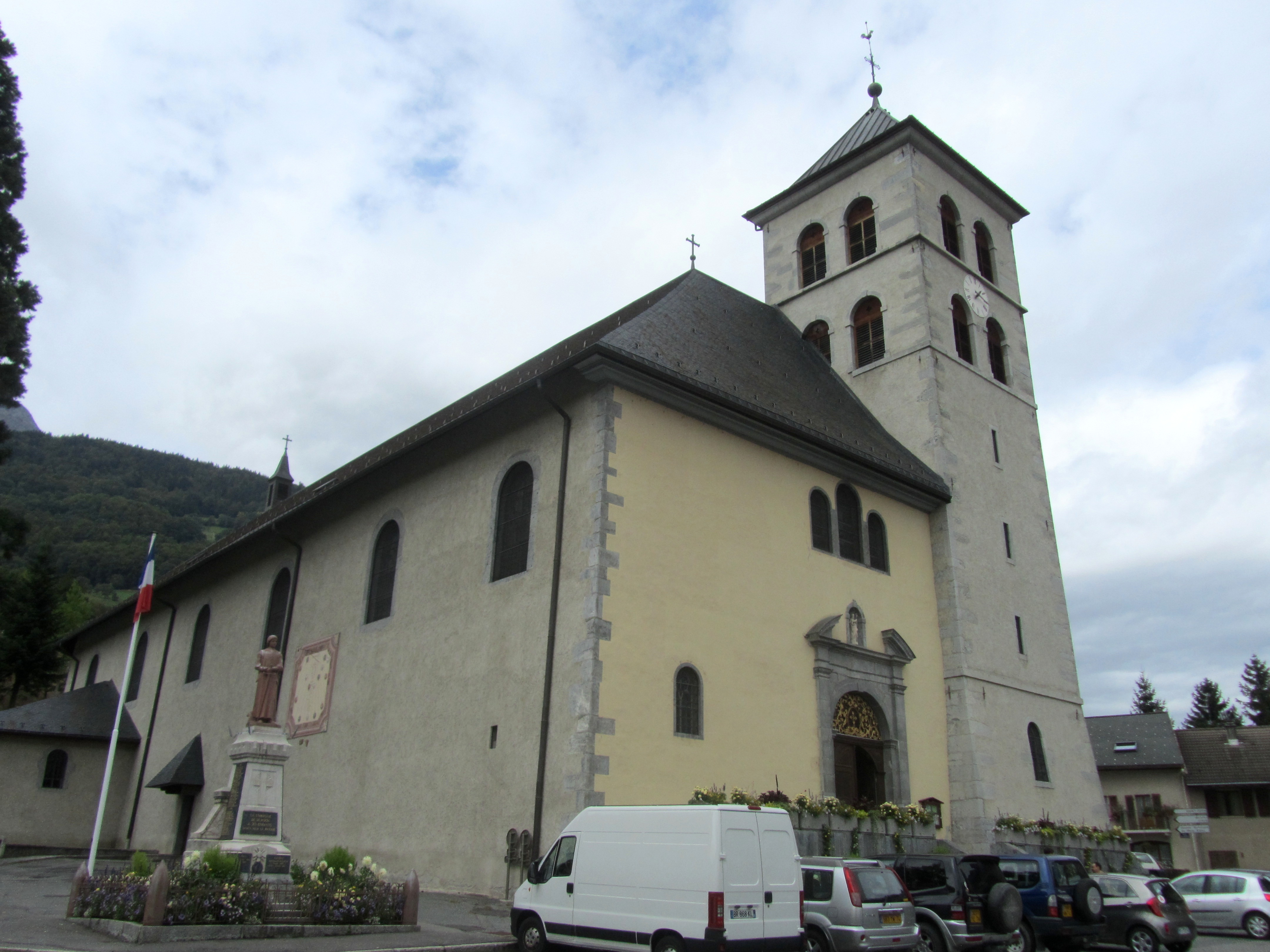
- The church in Sallanches

- Coat of arms
- Location of Sallanches
- Location within France Location within Auvergne-Rhône-Alpes
- Coordinates: 45°56′14″N 6°37′58″E
- Country: France
- Region: Auvergne-Rhône-Alpes
- Department: Haute-Savoie
- Arrondissement: Bonneville
- Canton: Sallanches

Government
  - Mayor (2020–2026): Georges Morand
- Area^{1}: 65.87 km^{2} (25.43 sq mi)
  - Urban: 416.5 km^{2} (160.8 sq mi)
- Elevation: 558 m (1,831 ft)
- Highest elevation: 2,749 m (9,019 ft)
- Lowest elevation: 515 m (1,690 ft)
- Population (2023): 17,319
  - Density: 262.9/km^{2} (681.0/sq mi)
  - Urban (2022): 46,242
  - Urban density: 111.0/km^{2} (287.6/sq mi)
- Time zone: UTC+01:00 (CET)
  - Summer (DST): UTC+02:00 (CEST)
- INSEE/Postal code: 74256 /74700
- ^{1} French Land Register data, which excludes lakes, ponds, glaciers > 1 km^{2} (0.386 sq mi or 247 acres) and river estuaries.

Sallanches (French pronunciation: [salɑ̃ʃ]; Arpitan: Salenches) is a commune in the Haute-Savoie department of the Auvergne-Rhône-Alpes region of France. Located close to the Mont Blanc massif, many visitors pass through the town en route to well-known alpine resorts such as Chamonix, Megève and Saint-Gervais-les-Bains. Sallanches is the centre of an urban area with about 46,000 inhabitants.

== Toponymy ==
The name Sallanches derives from Chalanche, a French-provençal word, of probably preceltic origin, designating "stiff slope which serves as a corridor for avalanches, a ravine flank of a mountain or a ravine".,,. It is a fairly widespread name under various derivatives in the alpine region. The city was built on the torrent of the Sallanche.

The parish or village is mentioned in various Latin forms, including Salancia, Sabaudiorum, Chalanchia and Salanchia, in the Cluny Abbey cartulary from 1178. Over the next centuries, the spelling evolved with apud Salanciam (1212), Salenchia (1339) or Cura de Salanchia (1344). The current form seems to have stabilized from the 18th century onward.

In Franco-provençal, the name of the commune is written Salanshe, according to the script of Conflans.

== Geography ==
Sallanches is a commune located in the far east of France in the Arve Valley of the historical region of Savoy. The town is located close to the Swiss and Italian borders. The town occupies the northern part of the Sallanches basin, a large glacial plain crossed by the Arve and bordered by the Aravis Range, the Mont Blanc massif and the Faucigny massif. The vast basin with low steep slopes contrasts with the high peaks that surround it.

Sallanches is dominated to the west by part of the Aravis Range, in particular the summit of the Quatre Têtes (2364 m) and La Miaz (2336m).

The town is bordered in the north by Magland, the northwest Le Reposoir, in the west by the ski resort Le Grand-Bornand, in the southwest by Cordon, Haute-Savoie,, in the south by La Giettaz, in the southeast by Combloux and Megève, and in the east by Passy and Domancy. The area is dedicated mainly to agriculture and tourism (due to its lakes, offering campsites).

=== Transport ===
Sallanches is served by the A40 autoroute Mâcon-Chamonix motorway, allowing Sallanchards to reach Annemasse in 35 minutes, Annecy or Geneva in less than 50 minutes, and Lyon or Grenoble in less than two hours. Sallanches is connected to the national motorway network (link A40-A41, A40-A6...). Until 2009, Sallanches had only a half-exchange, preventing the population from travelling by the motorway to Chamonix, a source of regular congestion in the city. The interchange was completed in September 2009.

The city is crossed by two former national roads, departmentalized since 2006: RD 1212 (ex-RN 212) Sallanches-Albertville, and RD 1205 (ex-RN 205) Bonneville-Chamonix.

As of 2024, the city remains little connected to a public transport network, apart from the rail network and the inter-urban network: Sallance has a railway station, Sallanches-Combloux-Megève, on the La Roche-sur-Foron–Saint-Gervais-les-Bains-Le Fayet line.

Sallanches Aerodrome was a small aerodrome at the Ilettes leisure base. It served as a rear base for the mountains of the Mont Blanc massif. In 2019, the municipality abolished it to enlarge the natural area, and in 2020, the airfield was permanently closed and the hangars demolished.

Sallanches is located less than 65 km from Geneva Airport, less than 70 km from Annecy–Haute-Savoie Airport, and less than 200 km from Lyon Airport.

== History ==
In spite of the ancient etymology of the name of the city, no remnants exist of a Gallo-Roman site. In excavations from 1992, only two tombs characteristic of the 5th - 6th centuries were discovered in the basement of the church.

Until the end of the 13th century, the small town developed as a religious and economic center of the region. Since the 14th century its church, erected as a collegiate church, extended its jurisdiction over many parishes around the course of the Revolution. Sallanches had two convents: the Order of Friars Minor Capuchin founded in 1619 and the Ursulines from 1630; they disappeared in the turmoil of the French Revolution.

In 1310, first franchises for selling agricultural products manufactured by the city's craftsmen on the weekly market were granted to its inhabitants. This communal code was at the origin of the prosperity of the city and the establishment of noble families who built castles and fortresses. Throughout this period, the fate of Sallanches was linked to that of the province of Faucigny, since 1355 in possession of the House of Savoy at the origin of the Kingdom of Piedmont-Sardinia (1718).

Sallanches experienced seven major fires: on 14 April 1520, on 29 November 1669, on 20 January 1696, on 9 February 1768, on 13 November 1773, on 19 April 1783 and on 19 April 1840. The seventh fire ravaged the city for at least three hours, destroying 268 houses out of the 273 of the town- the historic town was destroyed.

After the period of the French occupation during the French Revolution (Sallanches was the capital of a judicial district under the Directionoire) and the First Empire (France), from 1792 to 1814, the Sardinian monarchy was restored.

=== The 19th century, the beginning of the economic boom ===
At the beginning of the 19th century, the religious influence of the city regressed. It continued its economic development with fairs and markets, varied trades and some factories (filatures, brewery, chocolate). The first tourists on their way to Chamonix stopped in its inns.

Over the centuries, the city experienced several devastating ordeals: epidemics, torrential floods and fires (1519, 1669, 1840). 1840 is the most significant date in its history: a fire destroyed it almost entirely and its architectural past was destroyed. King Charles Albert of Savoie-Carignan then devoted exceptional funds to reconstruction. A new town was built, whose plan in Sardinian checkerboard was designed by the engineer François Justin. He drew his plan around the two torrents that cross the city. It is this plan that always forms the urban skeleton of the city center.

The architecture of the reconstructed buildings was the neo-classical Sardinian style, namely very symmetrical buildings with balconies overlooking the street and backyards hidden from direct gaze. The town hall was completed in 1844, in this style characterized by numerous colonnades and trompe-l'oeil paintings. The traveller and archivist paleographer Francis Wey (1812-1882) commented on these developments in 1860: "The appearance of this recently rebuilt city can be summed up at a distance. If this city had been able to preserve its streets, its monuments and the physiognomy that so many centuries had emprinted on it, Sallanches would offer the double attraction of a Gothic city of Flanders, spread in the middle of one of the most splendid sites in the world. ... Sallanches, the active and industrial capital of a canton, is no longer, for the traveller, a first encampment of the alpine excursions.

During the debates on the future of the Duchy of Savoy in 1860, the population was open to the idea of a union of the northern part of the Duchy of Switzerland. A petition circulated in this part of the country (Chablais, Faucigny, North of Geneva) and brought together more than 13,600 signatures [Foot 4, of which 127 are for the commune21, The duchy was reunited following a plebiscite held on 22 and 23 April 1860, where 99.8% of Savoyards replied “yes” to the question “Savoie want to be gathered in France?

The end of the 19th century saw large public work developments: construction of the quays (1863), development of the Place Saint-Jacques (1886), opening of the national road 202 Cluses - Saint-Gervais (1886), construction of a drinking water network (1889), arrival of the train (1889). On the economic front, when some traditional activities stagnated or disappear, the watchmaking appeared around 1880.

=== 20th century ===
The city entered the modern era in 1901, with the first light bulb. In 1921, Sallanches was declared a "passenger resort".

In addition to the development of processing industries, its commercial function (banks, insurance, food distribution) in the service of neighbouring communes was increasing. Sustained economic activity in the city after World War II led to a popular appeal and expansion outside of its checkerboard-domain from 1840. During the 1970s, the commune merged with that of Saint-Roch (1972) and that of Saint-Martin-sur-Arve (1977).

After decades of intensive industrial development including the turning industry and Dynastar skis and the resurgence of tourist and commercial activity, facilitated by the opening of the Mont Blanc tunnel in 1965, Sallanches has asserted itself as a capital of the Mont Blanc region in its sumptuous setting, open to the Mont Blanc massif, with a relatively preserved natural environment.

=== 21st Century ===
The city of Sallanches, because of its demographic explosion due in particular to a lower cost of living and house prices than those in the surrounding stations, has been facing an increased housing shortage, particularly social housing the city is well below the minimum limit of 20% set by the SRU Act, since it currently has an 11 per cent social housing rate.

Many current municipal projects aim at the conversion and complete reorganisation of the heart of the city. The city is now growing above all through its periphery and hillsides, but develops little in the center. In addition, a road bypass to the city, which is very regularly a victim of large traffic jams at its centre, is being considered.

Some events since 2000 (non-exhaustive):

- 2003, start from a stage of the Tour de France cyclist to L'Alpe d'Huez;
- 2007, hosts the National Council of the Mountains;
- 2005-2009, total restructuring of Sallanches hospital.

== Climate ==
According to both the Köppen–Geiger and Trewartha climate classification systems, Sallanches features a temperate oceanic climate (Köppen Cfb; Trewartha Do) with no dry season. It is relatively near a Köppen warm-summer humid continental climate (Dfb) or Trewartha temperate continental climate (Dc) due to moderate elevation and continentality.

The average annual rainfall is very high due to its location in the northwestern part of the Alps. Summers are warm to hot and stormy while winters are cold to very cold and snowy. On average, Sallanches experiences 97.6 days per year with a minimum temperature below 0 °C (32.0 °F), 4.9 days per year with a minimum temperature below −10 °C (14.0 °F), 8.3 days per year with a maximum temperature below 0 °C (32.0 °F), and 23.4 days per year with a maximum temperature above 30 °C (86.0 °F). The record high temperature was 40.2 °C (104.4 °F) on 11 July 2023, while the record low temperature was −20.3 °C (−4.5 °F) on 6 January 1985.

Climate data for Sallanches (1991–2020 normals, extremes 1951–present)
Month	Jan	Feb	Mar	Apr	May	Jun	Jul	Aug	Sep	Oct	Nov	Dec	Year
Record high °C (°F)	18.8 (65.8)	24.0 (75.2)	26.5 (79.7)	30.0 (86.0)	35.2 (95.4)	37.0 (98.6)	40.2 (104.4)	40.0 (104.0)	34.7 (94.5)	32.3 (90.1)	24.3 (75.7)	21.3 (70.3)	40.2 (104.4)
Mean daily maximum °C (°F)	5.4 (41.7)	8.1 (46.6)	13.3 (55.9)	17.4 (63.3)	21.2 (70.2)	24.8 (76.6)	27.0 (80.6)	26.4 (79.5)	21.9 (71.4)	16.9 (62.4)	10.0 (50.0)	5.6 (42.1)	16.5 (61.7)
Daily mean °C (°F)	1.2 (34.2)	2.9 (37.2)	7.1 (44.8)	10.7 (51.3)	14.8 (58.6)	18.3 (64.9)	20.3 (68.5)	19.9 (67.8)	15.9 (60.6)	11.5 (52.7)	5.6 (42.1)	1.8 (35.2)	10.8 (51.5)
Mean daily minimum °C (°F)	−3.0 (26.6)	−2.3 (27.9)	0.9 (33.6)	3.9 (39.0)	8.4 (47.1)	11.8 (53.2)	13.5 (56.3)	13.3 (55.9)	9.9 (49.8)	6.1 (43.0)	1.1 (34.0)	−2.1 (28.2)	5.1 (41.2)
Record low °C (°F)	−20.3 (−4.5)	−19.7 (−3.5)	−13.4 (7.9)	−6.7 (19.9)	−3.0 (26.6)	−1.2 (29.8)	5.0 (41.0)	2.8 (37.0)	0.0 (32.0)	−4.7 (23.5)	−13.0 (8.6)	−17.3 (0.9)	−20.3 (−4.5)
Average precipitation mm (inches)	100.3 (3.95)	77.2 (3.04)	77.2 (3.04)	77.2 (3.04)	98.6 (3.88)	94.9 (3.74)	97.8 (3.85)	105.3 (4.15)	78.5 (3.09)	88.4 (3.48)	89.6 (3.53)	113.8 (4.48)	1,098.8 (43.27)
Average precipitation days (≥ 1.0 mm)	10.0	8.5	9.1	8.8	11.4	10.8	10.0	10.3	8.6	9.8	9.8	10.2	117.3
Source: Meteociel

== Population ==
Historical population
Year	Pop.	±% p.a.
1968	7,248	—
1975	9,026	+3.18%
1982	10,296	+1.90%
1990	12,767	+2.73%
1999	14,383	+1.33%
2007	15,495	+0.94%
2012	15,957	+0.59%
2017	16,088	+0.16%
2023	17,319	+1.24%
Source: INSEE

== Politics and administration ==
The commune is the seat of the canton of Sallanches.

Formerly attached to the joint trade union of the Pays du Mont-Blanc (initially grouping together 14 communes), since 2013 it has been a member of the community of communes Pays du Mont-Blanc (CCPMB) grouping ten communes, with Combloux, Les Contamines-Montjoie, Cordon, Demi-Quartier, Domancy, Megève, Praz-sur-Arly, Passy, Saint-Gervais-les-Bains.

Sallanches is part of the arrondissement of Bonneville and the sixth constituency of Haute-Savoie established in 2009.

The sallancharde population tends to vote overwhelmingly, both in national and local elections, in favor of right-wing parties. The left has little presence in local political life (see municipal results below).

=== Municipal administration ===
In March 2008, the Salanchardes municipal elections were held in three competing lists: two lists on the right, “Sallanches, Ensemble Agissons” (conducted by the outgoing mayor, Georges Morand), “Salanches 2008, another future” (conducted by a deputy of the outgoing majority, René Chesney) and a left-wing list, “Democracy and progress” (conducted by an outgoing councillor). On 9 March 2008, Georges Morand's list was elected for his first term in the first round, with about 66.5% of the vote, compared to 18.9% for Marie-Pierre Gourichon and 14.5% for René Chesney. Morand was re-elected for a second term in the first round in the March 2014 elections and for a third term in the second round in June 2020.

Since 1947, only six mayors have succeeded one another: List of successive mayors from 1947 until presentz

#	Mayor	Term start	Term end	Party	Profession
1	Léon Curral	1947	1951	unknown	unknown
2	André Bottollier-Lasquin	1951	1959	unknown	unknown
3	Léon Curral	1959	1964	unknown	unknown
4	André Bottollier-Lasquin	1964	1965	unknown	unknown
5	Marcel Gouttry	March 1965	March 1971	unknown	unknown
6	Gabriel Viard	March 1971	March 1989	Rassemblement pour la République	unknown
7	Marie-Louise Pezet	March 1989	March 2001	Union pour la démocratie française - Centre des démocrates sociaux	unknown
8	George Morand	March 2001	present	Union pour un mouvement populaire - Les Républicains	Trader, General and then departmental councillor of Sallanches (2008), President of the CC Pays du Mont-Blanc (2014-2020)

=== Judicial and administrative proceedings ===
Sallanches has the registry detached from the Bonneville District Court, located on the premises of the mayor´s office, a gendarmerie brigade and municipal police. The most important administrations all have branches in Sallanches: Social Security, Employment Centre (in the city centre until 2009, in the industrial zone since then), and the Public Finance Centre.

=== Twin towns ===
- Spaichingen, Germany, since 1970

=== Heraldry ===

"De gueules au chevron versé ondé d'argent" The Blazon of a chevron of undulated silver lines was mentioned as early as the 17th century. The undulating chevron is reminiscent of the two rivers or torrents passing through the city, the Sallanche and the Frasse, which meet at the site of the building of the town.

== Economy ==
Sallanches is made popular by the presence of many high-tech industries and over 300 retail stores making the town a commercial hub. The ski manufacturer Dynastar was founded in Sallanches by merging the ski companies Dynamic and Starflex in 1963; it is owned by the Rossignol group. Skis Rossignol remained as of 2024 the only remaining manufacturing site of skis in France.

In 2015 Sallanches hospital announced that, as part of the government's "groupements hospitaliers de territoire" policy, it would develop a specialist accident department to research and develop mountain-related emergency medicine, because of its proximity to, and past experience of, dealing with accidents occurring in the nearby high mountains. With an emergency team of 30 doctors and emergency staff, plus 50 support staff, it is expected that the new mountain medicine department will become a world-leader in developing treatments and researching into altitude sickness, frostbite, hypoxia, trauma-injuries and related sports medicine.

== In society and culture ==
Sallanches is mentioned in American author Willa Cather's 1935 novel Lucy Gayheart.

Hemoglobin Sallanches, a mutation of hemoglobin, was first reported in a French family, in whom homozygosity led to Hemoglobin H disease.

At the 1980 UCI Road World Championships – Men's road race, held on a very tough parcours in Sallanches Bernard Hinault soloed to victory on the steepest part of a climb.

Sallanches was the start of stage 18 of the 2016 Tour de France.

== Notable native people ==
- bp Bernard Tissier de Mallerais (1945-2024), traditionalist Catholic auxiliary bishop of the Society of Saint Pius X
- Alain Penz (1947), alpine skier.
- Francis Cabrel (1953), singer songwriter
- Philippe Pugnat (1959), alpine skier
- Jocelyne Troccaz (1959)roboticist and researcher in medical imaging
- Michel Bibollet (1963) professional racing cyclist
- Serge Djelloul (1966), ice hockey player
- Laurent Boudouani (1966), boxer
- Christophe Barbier 1967, journalist
- Maurice Manificat, 1986 skier
- Nicolas Raffort (1991 alpine skier
- Coline Mattel, (1995), ski jumper
- Merlin Surget (1999) snowboarder

== See also ==
- Communes of the Haute-Savoie department
- Sallanches Aerodrome

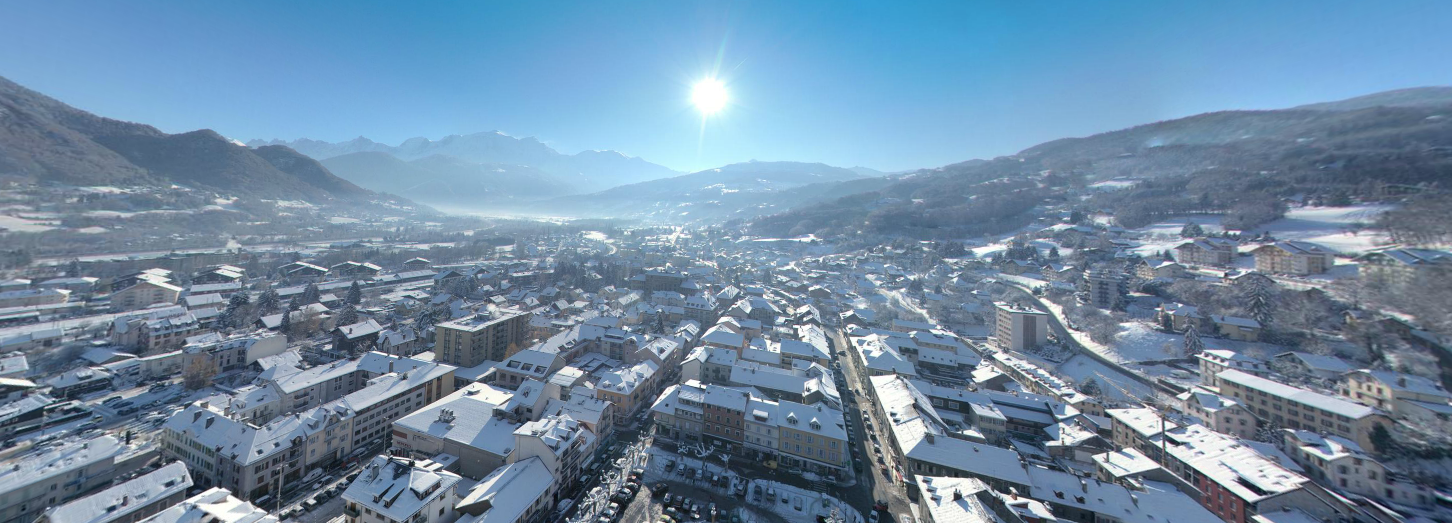
The city in winter
