= Bonneville, Haute-Savoie =

Subprefecture of Haute-Savoie, Auvergne-Rhône-Alpes, France

Bonneville Bônavela(Savoyard) Bonavilla (Italian)
- Subprefecture and commune
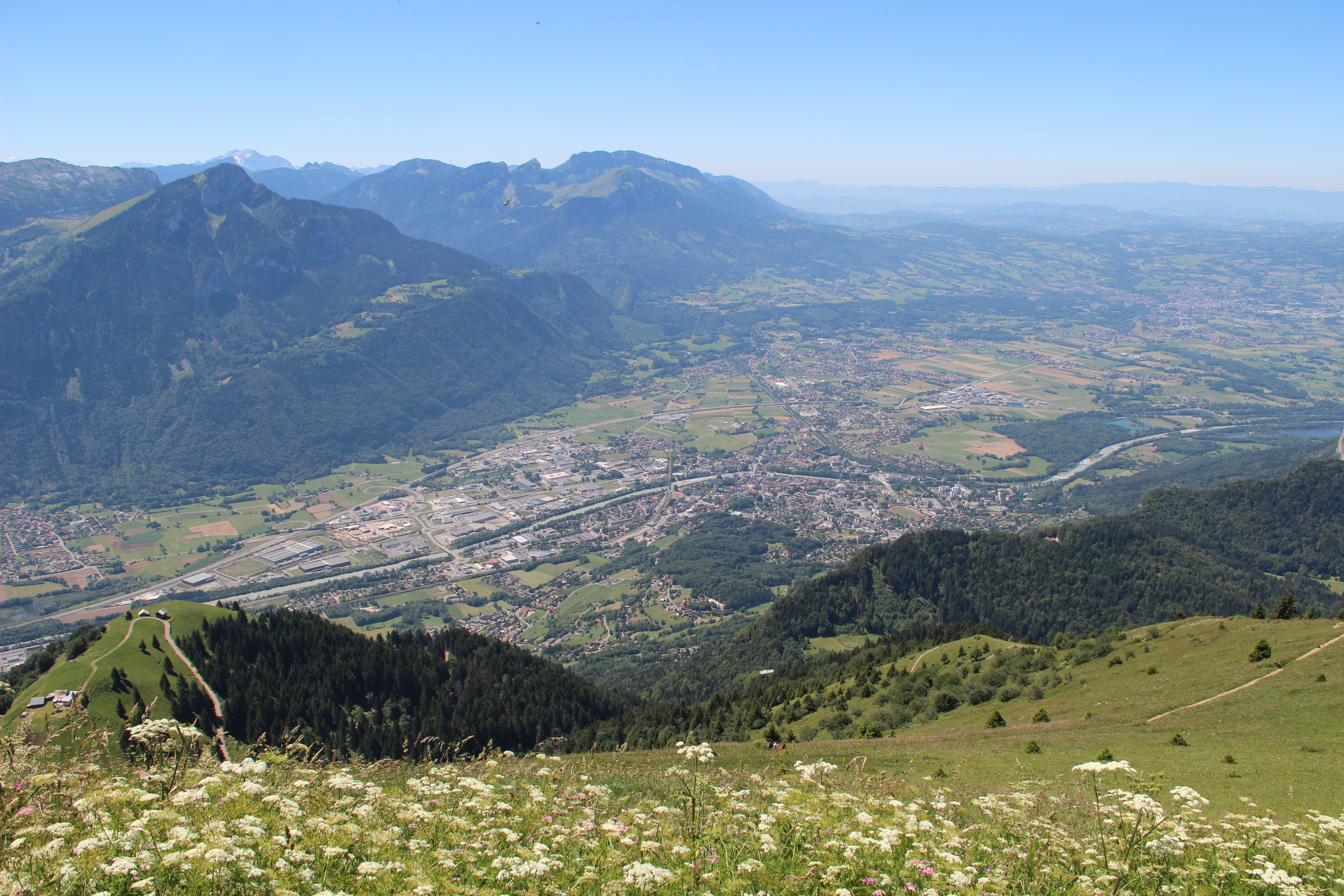
- A view of Bonneville

- Coat of arms
- Location of Bonneville
- Location within France Location within Auvergne-Rhône-Alpes
- Coordinates: 46°04′47″N 6°24′05″E
- Country: France
- Region: Auvergne-Rhône-Alpes
- Department: Haute-Savoie
- Arrondissement: Bonneville
- Canton: Bonneville
- Intercommunality: Faucigny-Glières

Government
  - Mayor (2020–2026): Stéphane Valli
- Area^{1}: 27.15 km^{2} (10.48 sq mi)
- Highest elevation: 1,877 m (6,158 ft)
- Lowest elevation: 450 m (1,480 ft)
- Population (2023): 13,335
  - Density: 491.2/km^{2} (1,272/sq mi)
- Time zone: UTC+01:00 (CET)
  - Summer (DST): UTC+02:00 (CEST)
- INSEE/Postal code: 74042 /74130
- ^{1} French Land Register data, which excludes lakes, ponds, glaciers > 1 km^{2} (0.386 sq mi or 247 acres) and river estuaries.

Bonneville (French pronunciation: [bɔnvil]; Savoyard: Bônavela; Italian: Bonavilla) is a subprefecture of the Haute-Savoie department in the Auvergne-Rhône-Alpes region in Eastern France.

== Geography ==
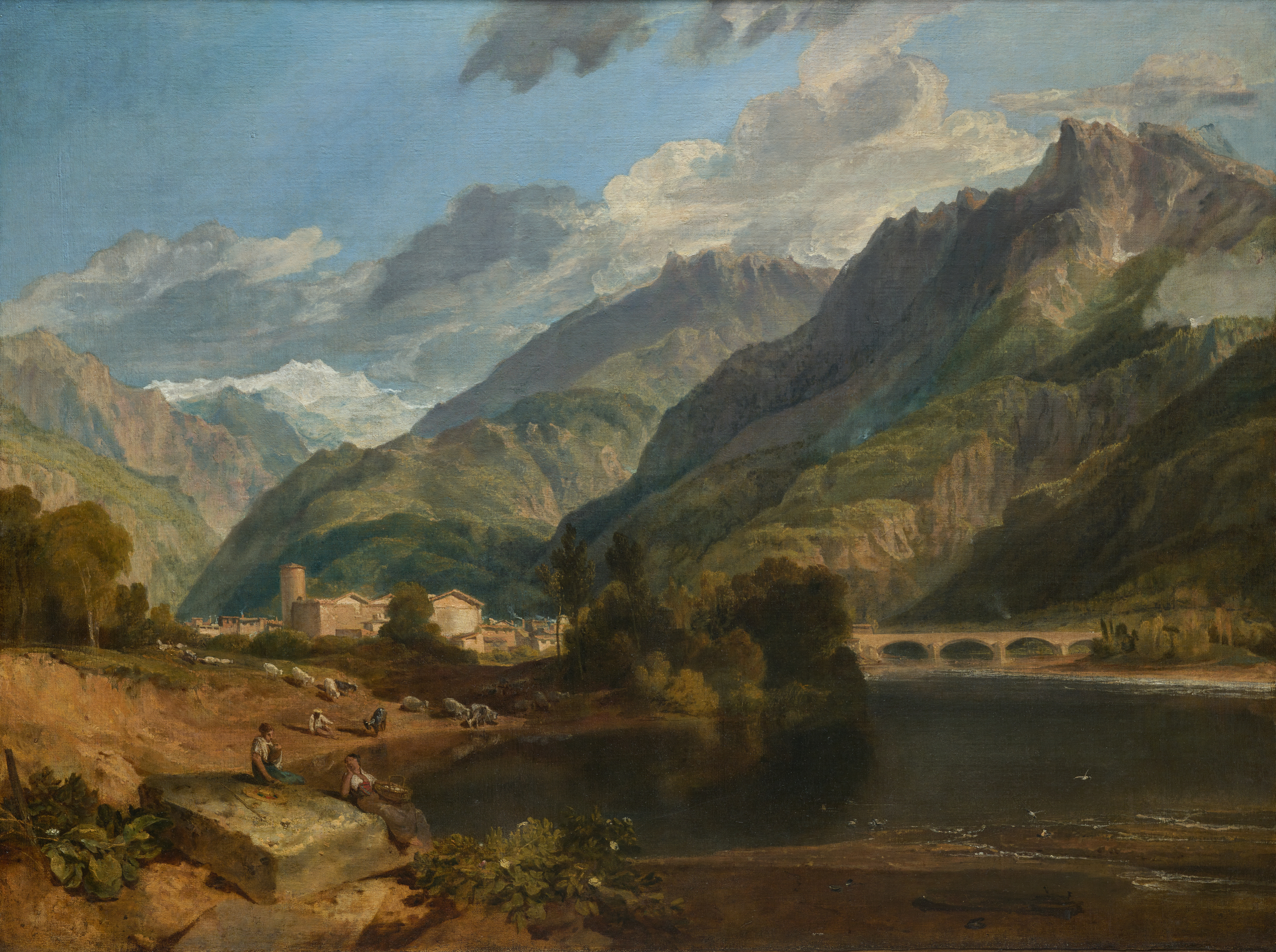
Bonneville, Savoy by J.M.W. Turner, 1803

Bonneville is on the A40 autoroute, roughly halfway between Geneva and Chamonix. The urban centre is on the north bank of the Arve river, with urban development reaching to the foot of the mountains to both the north and south.

Bonneville sits at the juncture between the Swiss Voralpen and the French Prealps. to the west, the Arve valley is a wide and fertile outwash plain, while to the east, it is a classical glacial valley.

=== Climate ===
Bonneville has a temperate oceanic climate (Köppen: Cfb) with precipitation evenly distributed throughout the year. Summers are warm with an average of 72.9 days with maximum temperature above 25 °C (77 °F) and 22 days with maximum temperature above 30 °C (86 °F). Winters are cold and 89.3 days have minimum temperature below freezing. Temperatures below −10 °C (14 °F) are possible from November to March.

Climate data for Bonneville (1991–2020)
Month	Jan	Feb	Mar	Apr	May	Jun	Jul	Aug	Sep	Oct	Nov	Dec	Year
Mean daily maximum °C (°F)	5.3 (41.5)	7.4 (45.3)	12.1 (53.8)	17.3 (63.1)	20.4 (68.7)	25.1 (77.2)	27.3 (81.1)	26.4 (79.5)	22.2 (72.0)	16.5 (61.7)	10.1 (50.2)	5.4 (41.7)	16.3 (61.3)
Daily mean °C (°F)	1.5 (34.7)	2.6 (36.7)	6.4 (43.5)	10.9 (51.6)	14.3 (57.7)	18.7 (65.7)	20.6 (69.1)	19.9 (67.8)	16.1 (61.0)	11.4 (52.5)	5.9 (42.6)	1.9 (35.4)	10.9 (51.6)
Mean daily minimum °C (°F)	−2.3 (27.9)	−2.1 (28.2)	0.7 (33.3)	4.5 (40.1)	8.1 (46.6)	12.4 (54.3)	14.0 (57.2)	13.4 (56.1)	10.0 (50.0)	6.3 (43.3)	1.7 (35.1)	−1.6 (29.1)	5.4 (41.7)
Average precipitation mm (inches)	75.1 (2.96)	64.5 (2.54)	72.2 (2.84)	73.8 (2.91)	104.3 (4.11)	89.8 (3.54)	93.8 (3.69)	109.3 (4.30)	75.2 (2.96)	80.6 (3.17)	80.1 (3.15)	88.9 (3.50)	1,007.6 (39.67)
Average precipitation days (≥ 1 mm)	10.7	8.6	10.4	8.5	11.8	9.4	8.9	9.9	7.9	9.4	9.4	10.9	115.8
Source: Meteociel

=== Transport ===
The commune has a railway station, Bonneville, on the La Roche-sur-Foron–Saint-Gervais-les-Bains-Le Fayet line.

== Population ==
Historical population
Year	Pop.	±% p.a.
1968	5,543	—
1975	7,702	+4.81%
1982	8,814	+1.95%
1990	9,998	+1.59%
1999	10,463	+0.51%
2007	11,380	+1.06%
2012	12,479	+1.86%
2017	12,608	+0.21%
2023	13,335	+0.94%
Source: INSEE

== Twin towns – sister cities ==
Bonneville is twinned with:

- Staufen im Breisgau, Germany (1963)
- Racconigi, Italy (1989)

== See also ==
- Communes of the Haute-Savoie department
