= Sallanches Aerodrome =

Former aerodrome in Sallanches

Sallanches Aerodrome Aérodrome de Sallanches
- IATA: none; ICAO: none

Summary
- Airport type: Public
- Serves: Sallanches
- Location: Sallanches
- Coordinates: 45°57′00″N 006°38′20″E
- Interactive map of Sallanches Aerodrome

Runways
Direction	Length		Surface
Direction	ft	m	Surface
17/35	1,969	600	Paved

Sallanches Aerodrome or Sallanches Mont-Blanc Aerodrome (French: Aérodrome de Sallanches), formerly IATA: XSN, ICAO: LFHZ, was an airport in Sallanches, a commune in Haute-Savoie, France. It was permanently closed on 1 September 2020.
