= Saint-Pierre, Aosta Valley =

Saint-Pierre Sèn-Piére (Valdôtain)
- Comune
- Comune di Saint-Pierre; Commune de Saint-Pierre
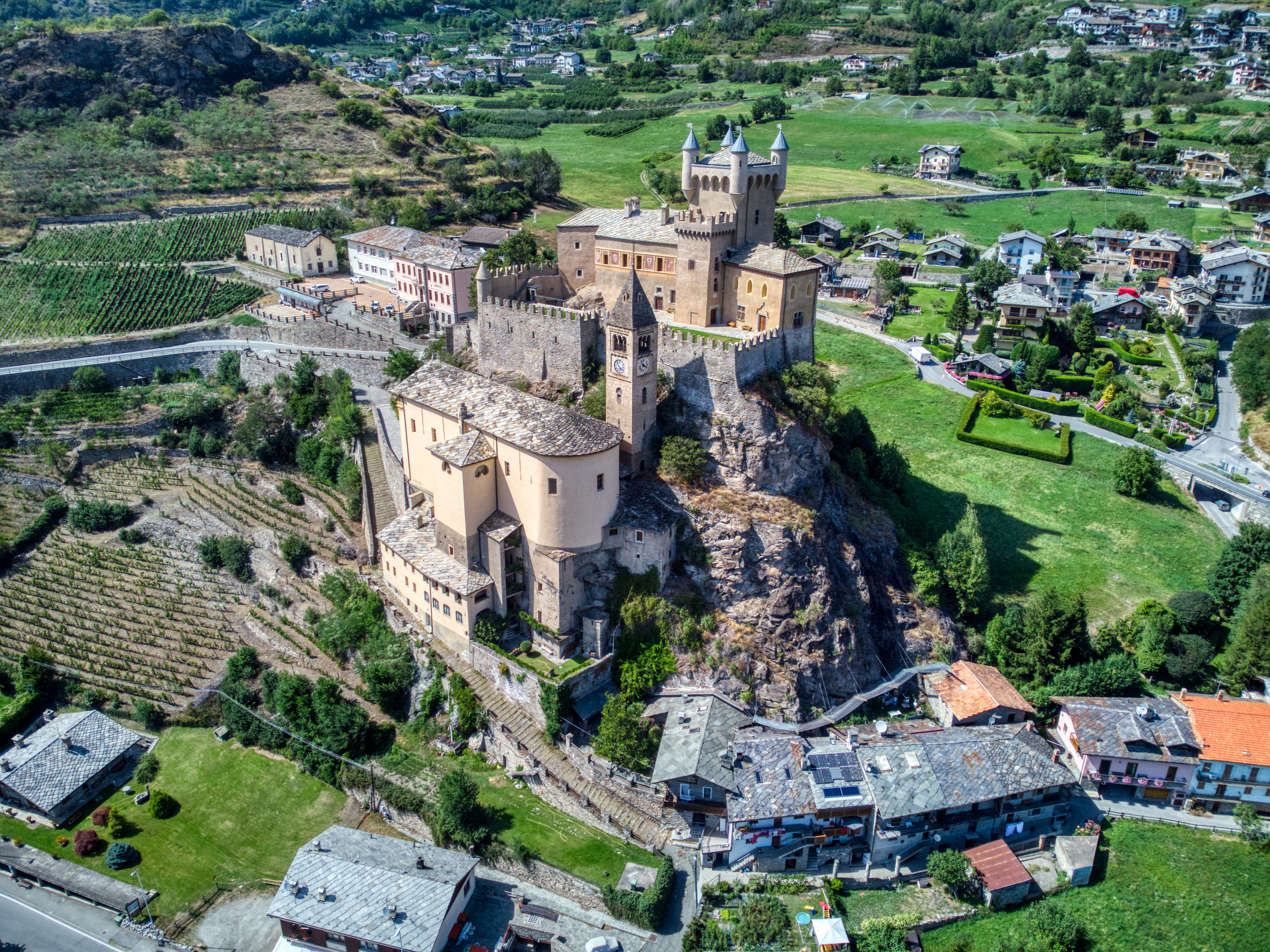
- Saint-Pierre Castle

- Coat of arms

- Location within Italy Location within Aosta Valley
- Coordinates: 45°42′36″N 7°13′34″E
- Country: Italy
- Region: Aosta Valley
- Province: none

Area
  - Total: 26 km^{2} (10 sq mi)
- Elevation: 731 m (2,398 ft)

Population (31 December 2022)
  - Total: 3,256
  - Density: 130/km^{2} (320/sq mi)
- Demonym: Saint-pierroleins
- Time zone: UTC+1 (CET)
  - Summer (DST): UTC+2 (CEST)
- Postal code: 11010
- Dialing code: 0165
- Patron saint: Saint Peter
- Saint day: 29 June
- Website: Official website

Saint-Pierre (French: [sɛ̃ pjɛʁ]; Valdôtain: Sèn-Piére) is a town and commune in the region of Aosta Valley, north-western Italy.

== Geography ==
=== Hamlets ===
Bourg (rue Conrad Gex, località Chévreyron, rue de la liberté, rue Émile Chanoux, rue du Châtel-Argent, rue de la tour, rue 4 Novembre, Clos Silvestre, rue de la colline, rue de la gare); Alleysin, Babelon, Bachod, Bercher, Bosses, Bressan, Breyes, Bussan Dessous, Bussan Dessus, Bussan du milieu, Caillet, Champrétavy, Chantel, Charrion, Château-Feuillet, Cognein, Combaz, Combellin, Creuzet, Étavel, Grandzettaz, Homené dessous, Homené dessus, Jacquemin, Jeanton, Jonin, La Barmaz, La Charrère, La Croix, La Grange, La Pièce, La Rosière, Luboz, Méod dessous, Méod dessus, Montagnine, Ordines, Orléans dessous, Orléans dessus, Orléantson, Pelon, Perchut, Plan Châtelair, Pommier, Praulin, Praximond, Preille, Prieuré, Ronchaille, Roserettaz, Rossan, Rumiod dessous, Rumiod dessus, Séez, Tâche, Torrette, Véreytaz, Vergnod, Vermian, Vernes, Verrogne, Vétan dessous, Vétan dessus, Vétan, Villette.

== Twin towns ==
- Saint-Pierre-en-Faucigny, France

== Landmarks ==
- Saint-Pierre Castle
- Sarriod de la Tour Castle
