= Serge Djelloul =

French ice hockey player

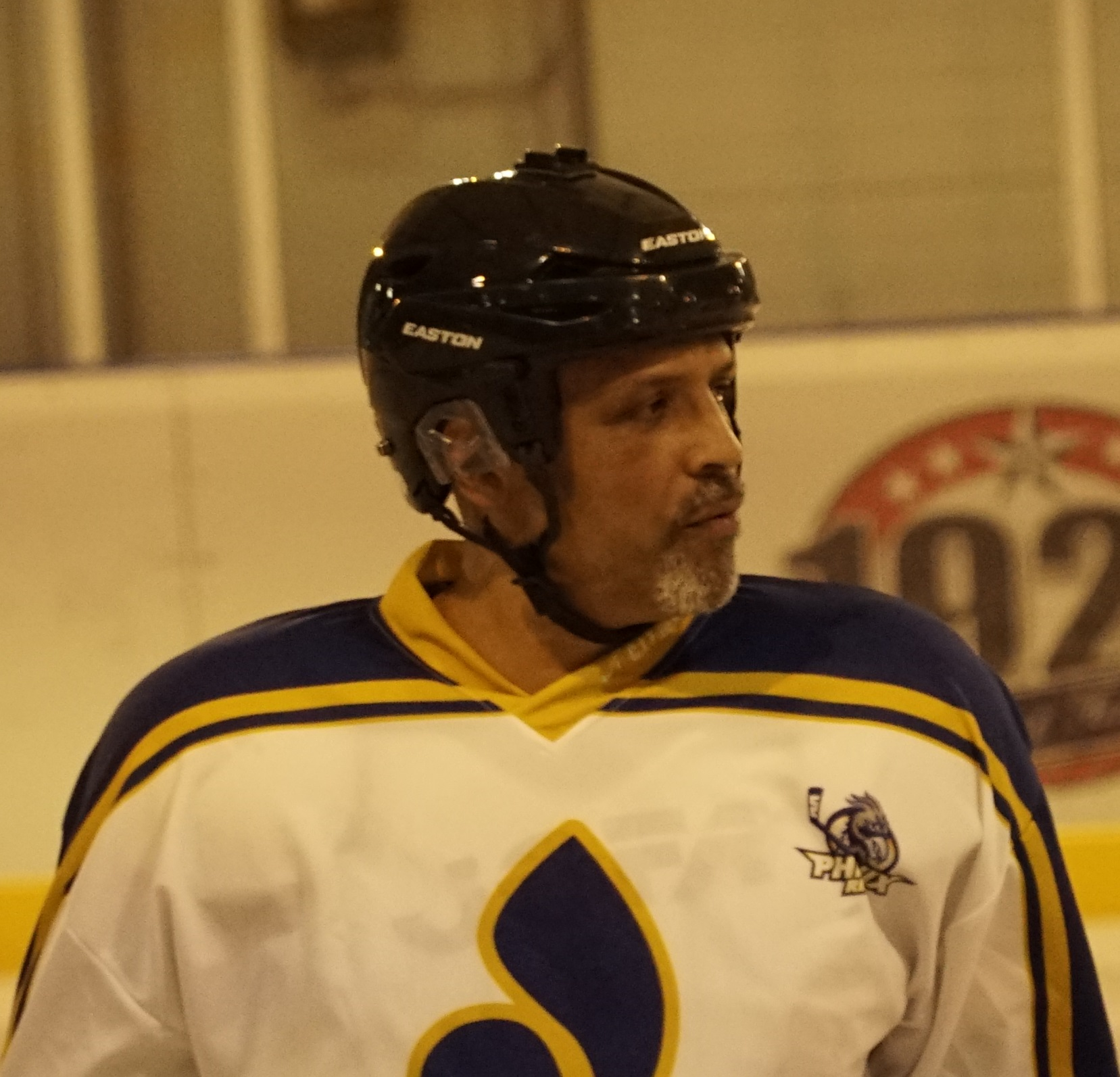
- Serge Djelloul in 2018
- Born: 28 March 1966 (age 59) Sallanches, France
- Height: 186 cm (6 ft 1 in)
- Weight: 92 kg (203 lb; 14 st 7 lb)
- Position: Defenceman
- Shot: Right
- Played for: Club des Sports de Megève; Dragons de Rouen; Hockey Club de Reims; Brûleurs de Loups; Gothiques d'Amiens; Essen Mosquitoes; EC Graz
- National team: France
- Playing career: 1984–2001

Serge Djelloul (born 28 March 1966 in Sallanches) is a French former ice hockey defenceman. He competed in the men's tournament at the 1998 Winter Olympics.
