= Combloux =

Combloux Konbleu (Savoyard)
- Commune
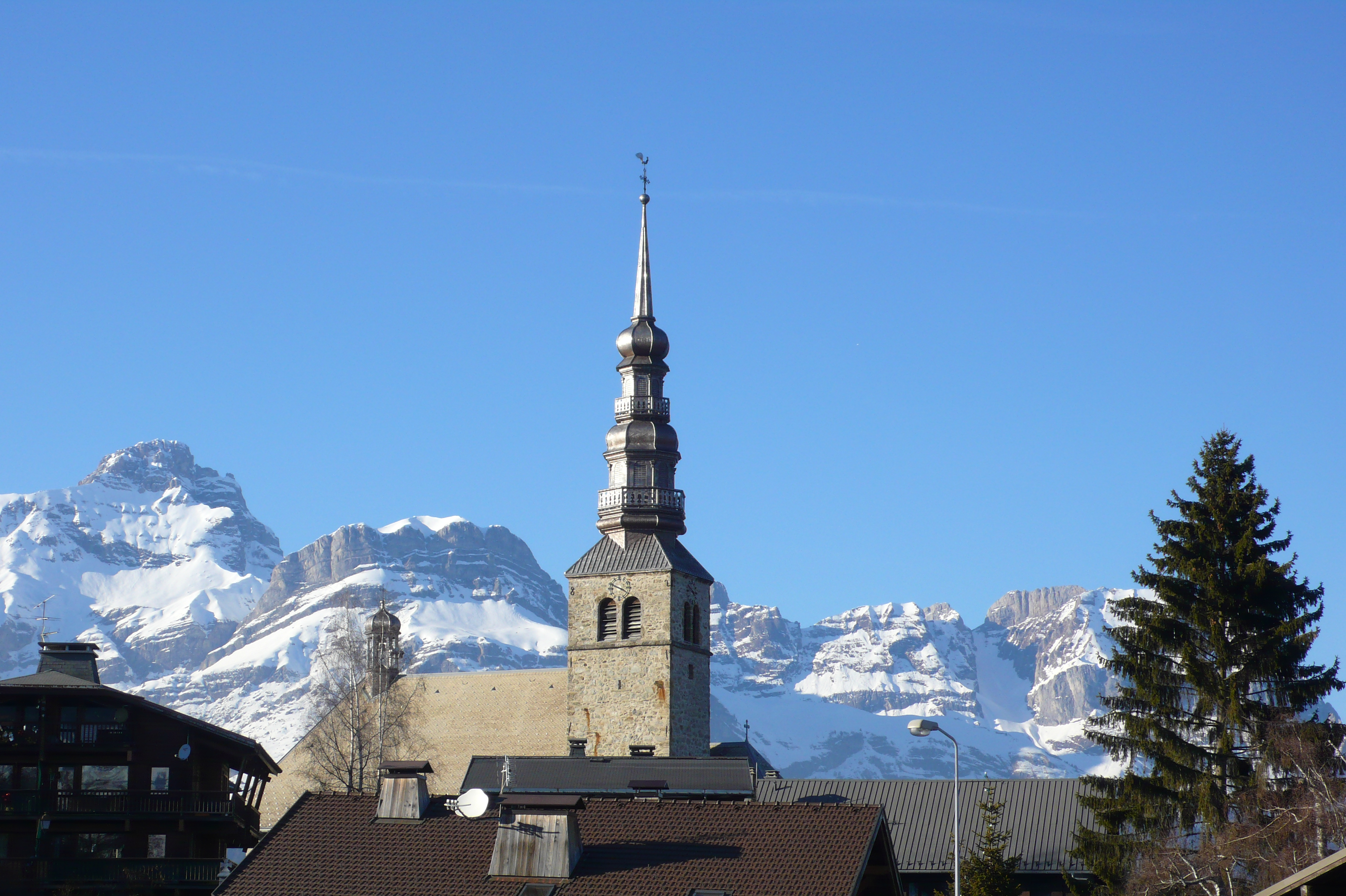
- The church with the Aravis in the background
- Location of Combloux
- Location within France Location within Auvergne-Rhône-Alpes
- Coordinates: 45°53′47″N 6°38′30″E
- Country: France
- Region: Auvergne-Rhône-Alpes
- Department: Haute-Savoie
- Arrondissement: Bonneville
- Canton: Sallanches
- Intercommunality: Pays du Mont-Blanc

Government
  - Mayor (2020–2026): Claude Chambel
- Area^{1}: 17.27 km^{2} (6.67 sq mi)
- Elevation: 960 m (3,150 ft)
- Highest elevation: 1,784 m (5,853 ft)
- Lowest elevation: 720 m (2,360 ft)
- Population (2023): 2,093
  - Density: 121.2/km^{2} (313.9/sq mi)
- Time zone: UTC+01:00 (CET)
  - Summer (DST): UTC+02:00 (CEST)
- INSEE/Postal code: 74083 /74920
- ^{1} French Land Register data, which excludes lakes, ponds, glaciers > 1 km^{2} (0.386 sq mi or 247 acres) and river estuaries.

Combloux (French pronunciation: [kɔ̃blu]; Savoyard: Konbleu) is a commune in the Haute-Savoie department in the Auvergne-Rhône-Alpes region in Southeastern France. A mountain village in the French Alps, it is also popular as a ski resort. Combloux is located 4 km (2.5 mi) from Megève and 30 km (19 mi) from Chamonix-Mont-Blanc.

== History ==
Before Combloux became a skiing resort, it was a traditional mountainous village with the main economy being made from farming which still exists today. It has stone and wooden chalets for accommodation and besides the residents, chalets are also an option for tourists. The village has expanded quickly recently. Combloux has been described as La perle du mont Blanc ("The pearl of the Mont Blanc") as a full view of the Mont Blanc is ever present. Combloux also has the first ecological lake for swimmers in France, open in summer and heated by the sun.

== Population ==
Historical population
Year	Pop.	±% p.a.
1968	1,151	—
1975	1,151	+0.00%
1982	1,379	+2.62%
1990	1,716	+2.77%
1999	1,976	+1.58%
2007	2,047	+0.44%
2012	2,079	+0.31%
2017	2,106	+0.26%
2023	2,093	−0.10%
Source: INSEE

== Tourism ==
In winter, Combloux is a skiing resort. It shares its skiing area with Megève, Saint-Gervais, Les Contamines, and La Giettaz, as a part of the "Evasion Mont-Blanc" area which gives it a total of 445 km of skiable pistes.

Combloux is also a tourist destination in summer, mainly for hiking and mountain-biking.

== See also ==
- Communes of the Haute-Savoie department
