= La Roche-sur-Foron–Saint-Gervais-les-Bains-Le Fayet railway =

Railway line in France

La Roche-sur-Foron–Saint-Gervais-les-Bains-Le Fayet
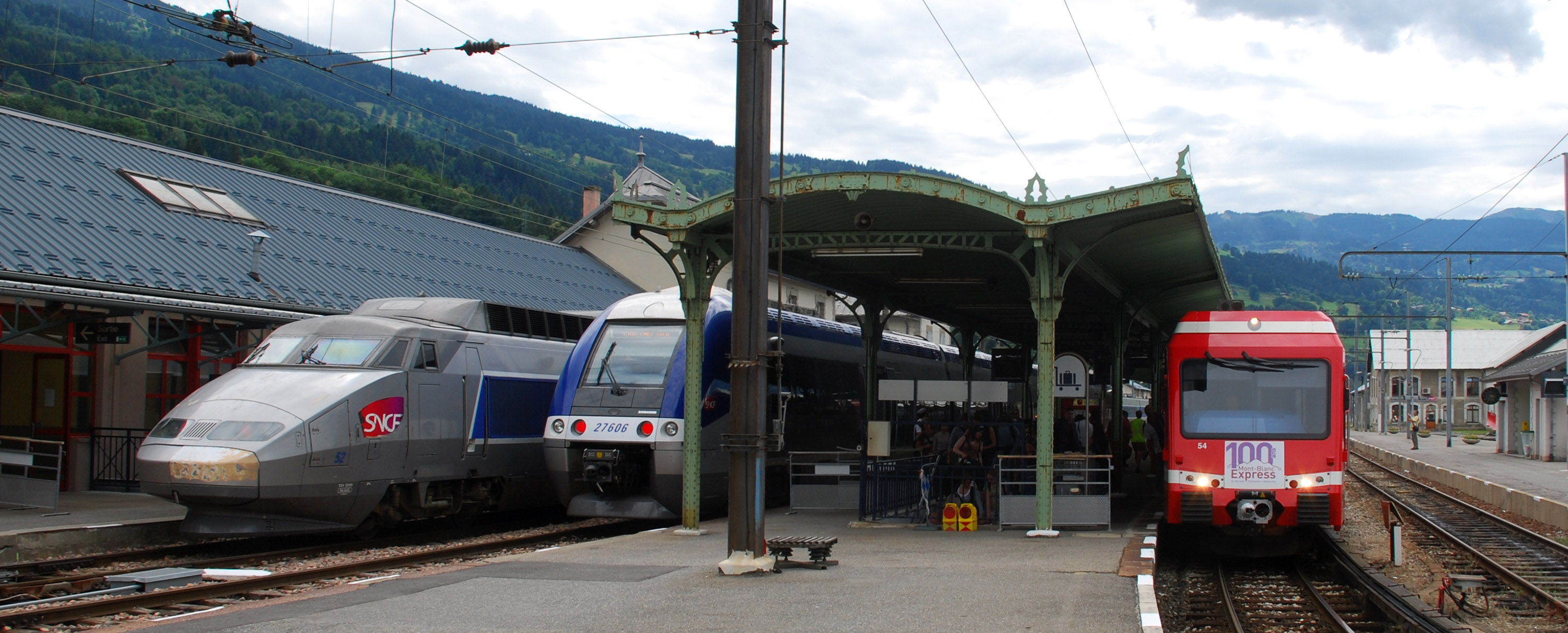
- Three different trains at Saint-Gervais-les-Bains-Le Fayet: a TGV, a TER, and a narrow-gauge local

Overview
- Owner: SNCF
- Termini: La Roche-sur-Foron; Saint-Gervais-les-Bains-Le Fayet

Service
- Route number: 895 (SNCF)

Technical
- Line length: 46.9 km (29.1 mi)
- Track gauge: 1,435 mm (4 ft 8 1/2 in) standard gauge
- Electrification: 25 kV 50 Hz

The La Roche-sur-Foron–Saint-Gervais-les-Bains-Le Fayet railway is a railway line in the Auvergne-Rhône-Alpes region of France. It runs 46.9 kilometres (29.1 mi) from La Roche-sur-Foron to Saint-Gervais-les-Bains.
