= Results of the 2024 French legislative election in Haute-Savoie =

Following the first round of the 2024 French legislative election on 30 June 2024, runoff elections in each constituency where no candidate received a vote share greater than 50 percent were scheduled for 7 July. Candidates permitted to stand in the runoff elections needed to either come in first or second place in the first round or achieve more than 12.5 percent of the votes of the entire electorate (as opposed to 12.5 percent of the vote share due to low turnout).

== Haute-Savoie ==
=== 1st constituency ===
Candidate	Party or alliance		First round		Second round	
Candidate	Party or alliance		Votes	%	Votes	%
Véronique Riotton	Ensemble	Renaissance	28,079	35.64	49,164	64.23
Guilaume Roit-Levêque	National Rally		24,500	31.09	27,383	35.77
Anne-Valérie Duval	New Popular Front	La France Insoumise	17,980	22.82		
Florian Thabuis	The Republicans		6,527	8.28		
Claudine Molin	Reconquête		937	1.19		
Jacques Mattei	Far-left	Lutte Ouvrière	675	0.86		
Stéphane Espic	Independent		98	0.12		
Total			78,796	100.00	76,547	100.00
Valid votes			78,796	97.41	76,547	95.28
Invalid votes			529	0.65	832	1.04
Blank votes			1,570	1.94	2,962	3.69
Total votes			80,895	100.00	80,341	100.00
Registered voters/turnout			110,684	73.09	110,725	72.56

=== 2nd constituency ===
Candidate	Party or alliance		First round		Second round	
Candidate	Party or alliance		Votes	%	Votes	%
Antoine Armand	Ensemble	Renaissance	23,783	33.27	47,182	68.83
Anis Bouvard	National Rally		20,583	28.80	21,371	31.17
Guillaume Tatu	New Popular Front	The Ecologists	19,215	26.88		
Alexandre Richefort	The Republicans		5,396	7.55		
Jérémy Langlade-Nouchy	Regionalists	Independent	1,077	1.51		
Pascale Vincent	Reconquête		872	1.22		
Naci Yildirim	Far-left	Lutte Ouvrière	411	0.58		
Geoffrey Cornet	Far-left	Independent	139	0.19		
Total			71,476	100.00	68,553	100.00
Valid votes			71,476	97.84	68,553	94.99
Invalid votes			362	0.50	774	1.07
Blank votes			1,219	1.67	2,839	3.93
Total votes			73,057	100.00	72,166	100.00
Registered voters/turnout			101,693	71.84	101,713	70.95

=== 3rd constituency ===
Candidate	Party or alliance		First round		Second round	
Candidate	Party or alliance		Votes	%	Votes	%
Antoine Valentin	Union of the far right	The Republicans	24,182	39.68	26,309	43.81
Christelle Petex	Miscellaneous right	Independent	19,726	32.37	33,738	56.19
Gérard Vez	New Popular Front	La France Insoumise	14,630	24.01		
Véronique Bouvier	Regionalists	Independent	1,742	2.86		
Jocelyne Legouhy	Far-left	Lutte Ouvrière	656	1.08		
Total			60,936	100.00	60,047	100.00
Valid votes			60,936	97.62	60,047	96.26
Invalid votes			326	0.52	474	0.76
Blank votes			1,157	1.85	1,862	2.98
Total votes			62,419	100.00	62,383	100.00
Registered voters/turnout			89,948	69.39	89,979	69.33

=== 4th constituency ===
Candidate	Party or alliance		First round		Second round	
Candidate	Party or alliance		Votes	%	Votes	%
Virginie Duby-Muller	The Republicans		20,865	37.25	37,452	68.89
Magalie Luho	National Rally		16,159	28.85	16,911	31.11
Dominique Lachenal	New Popular Front	Socialist Party	15,331	27.37		
Alexandre Gianesello	Miscellaneous centre	Independent	2,265	4.04		
Barbara Lemmo Gaud	Regionalists	Independent	945	1.69		
Cécile Roche	Far-left	Lutte Ouvrière	371	0.66		
Jean-Marc Lorenzo	Independent		83	0.15		
Total			56,019	100.00	54,363	100.00
Valid votes			56,019	98.51	54,363	96.86
Invalid votes			211	0.37	333	0.59
Blank votes			639	1.12	1,430	2.55
Total votes			56,869	100.00	56,126	100.00
Registered voters/turnout			90,925	62.54	90,902	61.74

=== 5th constituency ===
Candidate	Party or alliance		First round		Second round	
Candidate	Party or alliance		Votes	%	Votes	%
Quentin Taïeb	Union of the far right	The Republicans	21,822	32.10	25,359	37.87
Anne-Cécile Violland	Ensemble	Horizons	21,124	31.08	41,609	62.13
Jean-Baptiste Baud	New Popular Front	Socialist Party	15,985	23.52		
Chrystelle Beurrier	Miscellaneous right		4,800	7.06		
Daniel Magnin	Regionalists	Independent	1,808	2.66		
Nicolas Bal	Regionalists	Independent	987	1.45		
Sacha Poidevin	Reconquête		963	1.42		
Michelle Bally	Far-left	Lutte Ouvrière	484	0.71		
Total			67,973	100.00	66,968	100.00
Valid votes			67,973	97.70	66,968	95.81
Invalid votes			412	0.59	704	1.01
Blank votes			1,187	1.71	2,224	3.18
Total votes			69,572	100.00	69,896	100.00
Registered voters/turnout			103,704	67.09	103,725	67.39

=== 6th constituency ===
Candidate	Party or alliance		First round		Second round	
Candidate	Party or alliance		Votes	%	Votes	%
Charles Prats	Union of the far right	The Republicans	19,639	36.21	22,041	41.16
Xavier Roseren	Ensemble	Renaissance	18,805	34.68	31,509	58.84
Alain Roubian	New Popular Front	Miscellaneous left	12,039	22.20		
Cyrille du Peloux	The Republicans		3,135	5.78		
Alexandre Demeure	Far-left	Lutte Ouvrière	614	1.13		
Total			54,232	100.00	53,550	100.00
Valid votes			54,232	97.85	53,550	95.79
Invalid votes			287	0.52	472	0.84
Blank votes			906	1.63	1,884	3.37
Total votes			55,425	100.00	55,906	100.00
Registered voters/turnout			82,158	67.46	82,169	68.04
