= Antoine Valentin =

French politician (born 1992)

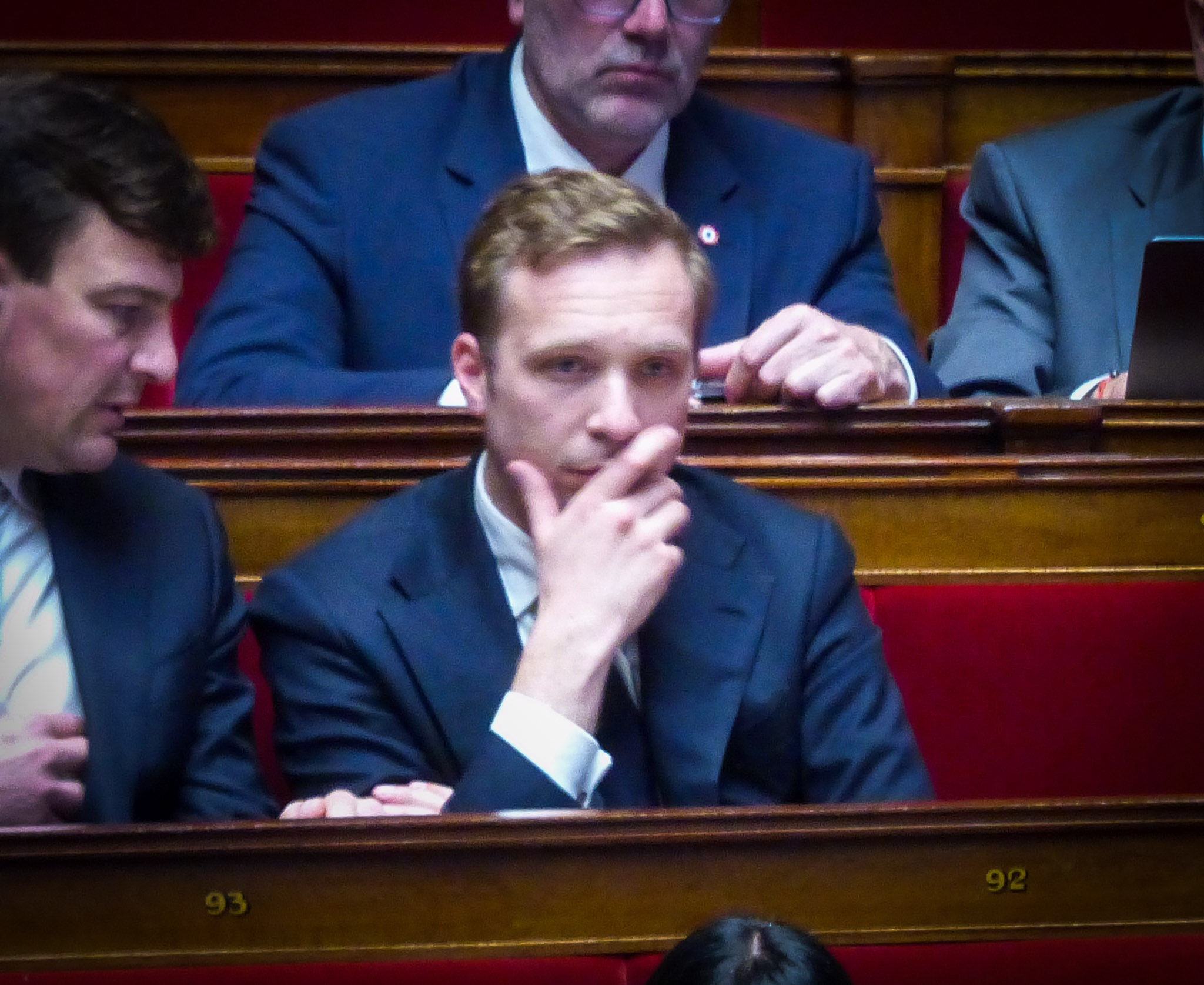
- Valentin in 2026

Member of the National Assembly for Haute-Savoie's 3rd constituency
- Incumbent
- Assumed office 2 February 2026
- Preceded by: Christelle Petex-Levet

Mayor of Saint-Jeoire
- Incumbent
- Assumed office 28 May 2020
- Preceded by: Nelly Noël-Sandrin

Personal details
- Born: 16 October 1992 (age 33) Bonneville, France
- Party: Union of the Right for the Republic (since 2024)
- Other political affiliations: The Republicans (until 2024); Debout la France (formerly)

Antoine Valentin (French pronunciation: [ɑ̃twan valɑ̃tɛ̃]; born 16 October 1992) is a French politician and entrepreneur who has served as mayor of Saint-Jeoire, Haute-Savoie since 2020. He has also served as president of Massif des Brasses since 2021, and as a general delegate of the Union of the Right for the Republic (UDR) since 2024. Valentin has been a member of the National Assembly since a by-election in 2026.

== Early life and career ==
Valentin was formerly a member of Debout la France, and was elected departmental secretary of the party in Haute-Savoie in 2014. In the 2015 departmental elections, he was a candidate for the Departmental Council of Haute-Savoie in the canton of Bonneville. In the 2017 legislative election, he was the substitute of independent candidate Charles Hedrich in Haute-Savoie's 6th constituency. He later joined The Republicans and endorsed Julien Aubert in the 2019 leadership election.

In the 2020 municipal elections, Valentin was elected mayor of Saint-Jeoire in an upset. Since 2021, he has served as president of Massif des Brasses. He endorsed the manifesto of Julien Aubert for the 2022 presidential election, and sponsored the candidacy of Éric Zemmour. In the 2024 legislative election, he was the candidate of The Republicans for Haute-Savoie's 3rd constituency, with the endorsement of the National Rally and Reconquête. He was defeated in the second round by Christelle Petex-Levet. He joined Éric Ciotti's newly founded Union of the Right for the Republic in 2024 and was appointed general delegate for local collectivities.
