= Dominique Martin =

Dominique Martin may refer to:

- Dominique Martin (politician, 1798-1865)
- Dominique Martin (politician)
- Dominique Martin (professor) from Bordeaux Segalen University
- Dominique Martin (film editor) known for Flesh Color
- Dominique Martin, football player of the Green Bay Packers
