= Ferney-Voltaire =

Commune in Auvergne-Rhône-Alpes, France

- Commune
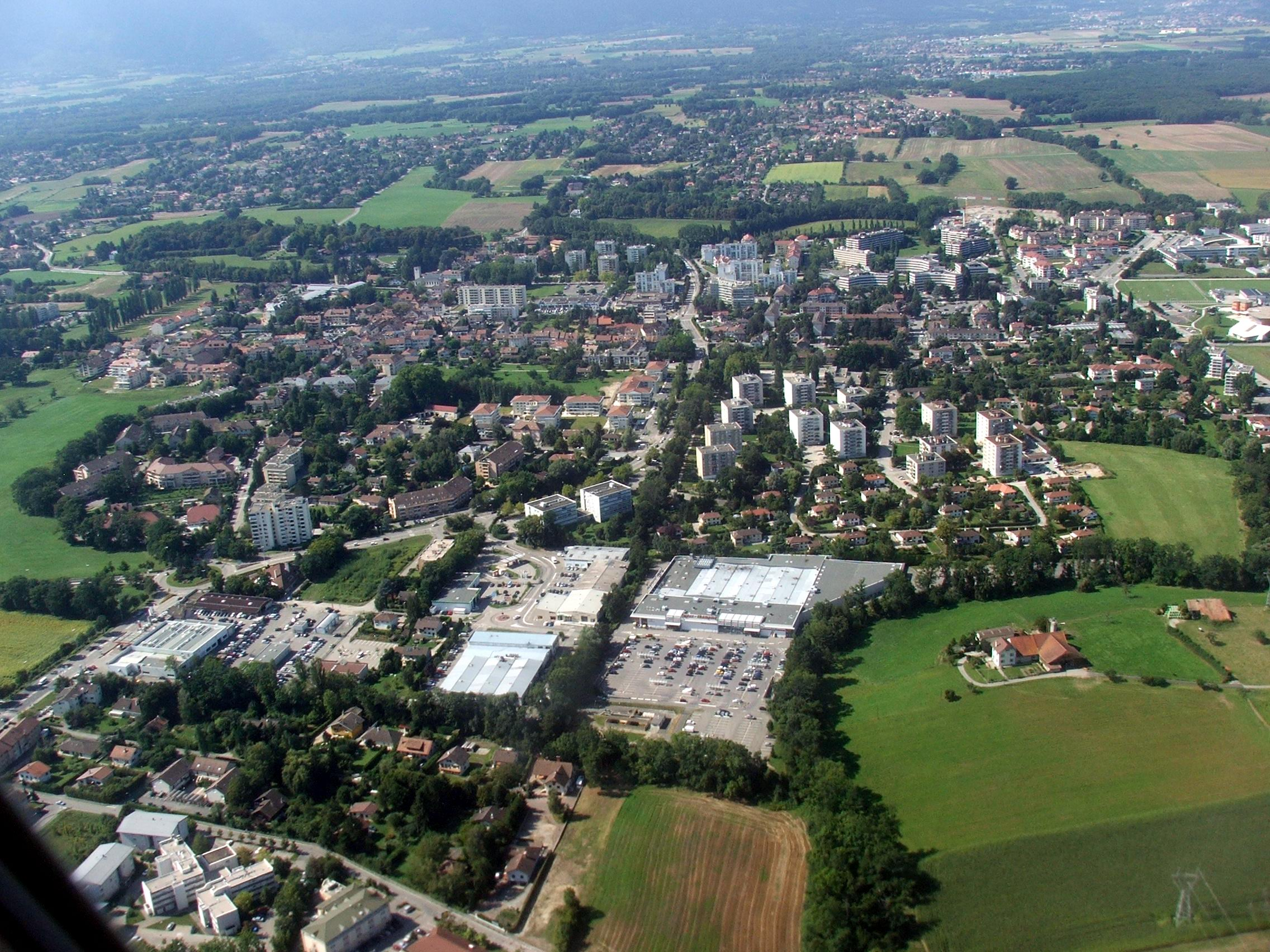

- Coat of arms
- Location of Ferney-Voltaire
- Location within France Location within Auvergne-Rhône-Alpes
- Coordinates: 46°15′21″N 6°06′29″E
- Country: France
- Region: Auvergne-Rhône-Alpes
- Department: Ain
- Arrondissement: Gex
- Canton: Saint-Genis-Pouilly
- Intercommunality: CA Pays de Gex

Government
  - Mayor (2026–32): Pierre-Marie Philipps
- Area^{1}: 4.78 km^{2} (1.85 sq mi)
- Elevation: 423 m (1,388 ft)
- Highest elevation: 446 m (1,463 ft)
- Lowest elevation: 409 m (1,342 ft)
- Population (2023): 12,094
  - Density: 2,530/km^{2} (6,550/sq mi)
- Time zone: UTC+01:00 (CET)
  - Summer (DST): UTC+02:00 (CEST)
- INSEE/Postal code: 01160 /01210
- ^{1} French Land Register data, which excludes lakes, ponds, glaciers > 1 km^{2} (0.386 sq mi or 247 acres) and river estuaries.

Ferney-Voltaire (French pronunciation: [fɛʁnɛ vɔltɛʁ]) is a commune in the Ain department in the Auvergne-Rhône-Alpes region of eastern France. It lies between the Jura Mountains and the Swiss border; it forms part of the metropolitan area of Geneva. It is named for Voltaire, who lived there from 1758.

== History ==
Ferney was first noted in 14th-century Burgundian registers as "Fernex" and changed several times until the 19th century to Fernay, Fernaj, Fernai or Fernex before adopting its current name as 'Ferney-Voltaire' in 1791, after the French Revolution which saw a number of city names unchristened and then given more republican names.

During Voltaire's residence in Ferney in the second part of the 18th century, the town saw rapid expansion. Today Ferney is a peaceful town with a Saturday market and a large international community, due to the proximity of CERN and the United Nations Office at Geneva. Ferney is growing very quickly. It is also home to the Lycée International. Voltaire still presides over Ferney with his statue in the centre of town.

== Voltaire ==
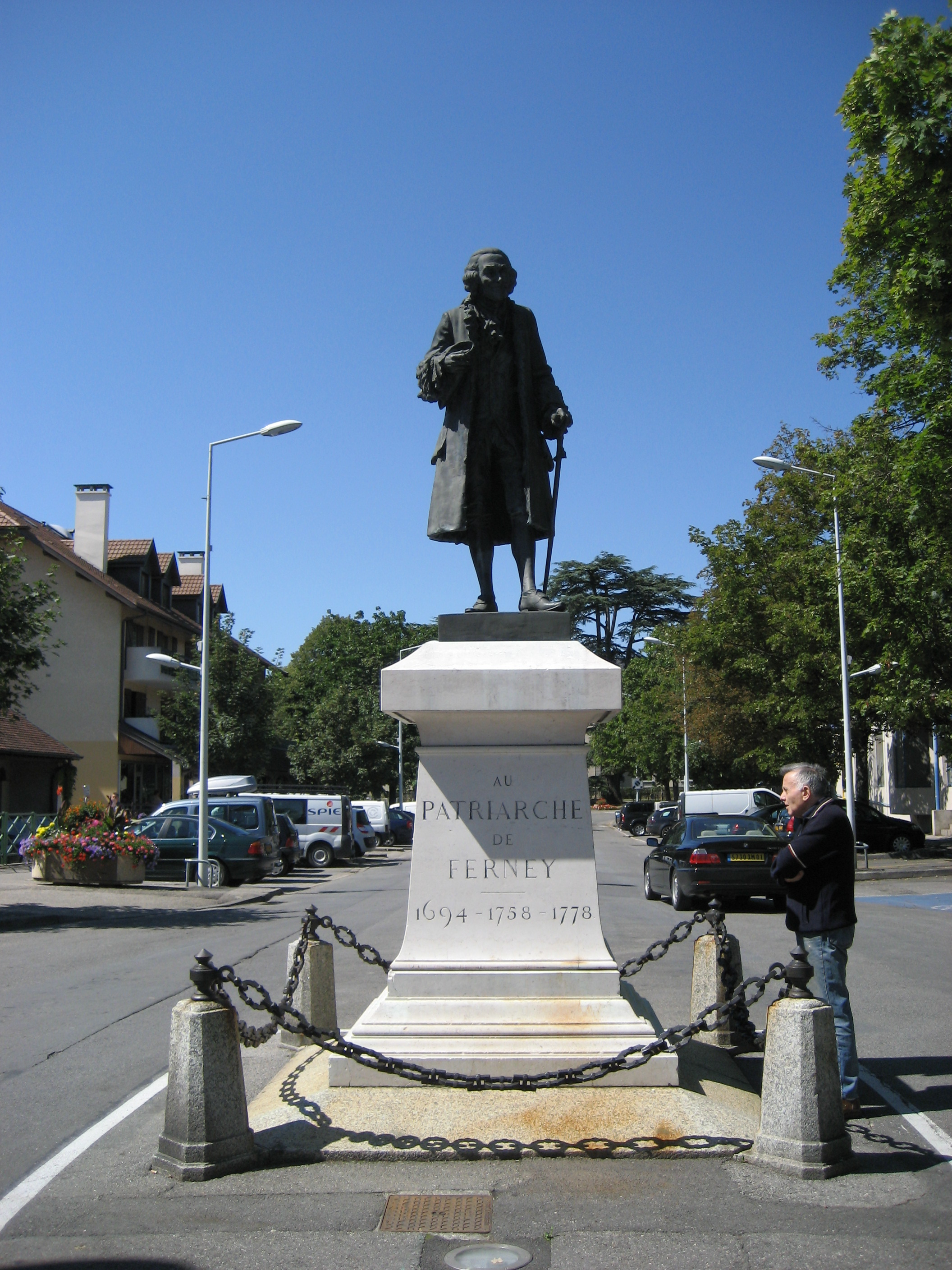
Statue of Voltaire in town's center

From 1758 to 1778 Ferney was home to French writer and philosopher Voltaire, sometimes referred to as "the patriarch of Ferney." His influence on the town was profound. He built the local church and founded cottage industries that produced some of the finest potters and watchmakers of modern France. The town was eventually renamed "Ferney-Voltaire" in his honour.

In 1758, after having lived in Geneva for less than two years, Voltaire purchased the estate of Ferney in France, near the Swiss border. A prime reason for his leaving Geneva was that theatre was forbidden in that Calvinist city, so he had decided to become the enlightened "patriarch" of the little village of Ferney, setting up potteries, a watchmaking industry and, of course, theatres, attracting rich people from Geneva to watch his plays.

During Voltaire's residence, the population of Ferney increased to more than 1,000. Voltaire lived there for the last 20 years of his life before returning to Paris, where he died in 1778.

== Population ==
Historical population

Year	Pop.	±% p.a.
1793	856	—
1800	884	+0.46%
1806	944	+1.10%
1821	686	−2.11%
1831	935	+3.15%
1836	1,194	+5.01%
1841	1,214	+0.33%
1846	1,238	+0.39%
1851	1,173	−1.07%
1856	1,138	−0.60%
1861	1,166	+0.49%
1866	1,288	+2.01%
1872	1,232	−0.74%
1876	1,403	+3.30%
1881	1,274	−1.91%
1886	1,222	−0.83%
1891	1,200	−0.36%
1896	1,232	+0.53%
1901	1,269	+0.59%

Year	Pop.	±% p.a.
1906	1,169	−1.63%
1911	1,172	+0.05%
1921	1,102	−0.61%
1926	1,209	+1.87%
1931	1,232	+0.38%
1936	1,224	−0.13%
1946	991	−2.09%
1954	1,275	+3.20%
1962	1,805	+4.44%
1968	2,984	+8.74%
1975	5,642	+9.53%
1982	6,399	+1.81%
1990	6,408	+0.02%
1999	7,083	+1.12%
2007	7,741	+1.12%
2012	8,844	+2.70%
2017	9,766	+2.00%
2023	12,094	+3.63%

Source: EHESS and INSEE (1968–2023)

== Schools ==
École Florian

The community has two public preschools/primary schools: École Jean-Calas and École Florian. A nearby intercommunal school, École Intercommunale Jean de la Fontaine in Prévessin-Moëns, also serves the community. As of 2018 the three schools had a combined total of 952 students, with Jean-Calas, Florian, and Jean de la Fontaine respectively having 278, 307, and 367 students. Around 1940 a primary school, the École de Ferney-Voltaire, was established. About 1970 it was renamed École Florian, after the French poet and fabulist Jean-Pierre Claris de Florian, whose uncle and guardian, the Marquis de Florian, had married a niece of Voltaire, Madame Dompierre de Fontaine. The school is notable for having had a large number of pupils who were children of physicists at CERN, which is located in the vicinity. Ferney-Voltaire also has a private preschool/primary school, École Saint-Vincent.

Collège Le Joran (junior high school), in Prévessin-Moëns, serves Ferney-Voltaire. Lycée international de Ferney-Voltaire, including a junior high school/middle school (collège) and a senior high school/sixth form college (lycée) was created in 1961 in Ferney-Voltaire. As of 2016, the Lycée includes a branch campus in Saint-Genis-Pouilly.

== Sights ==
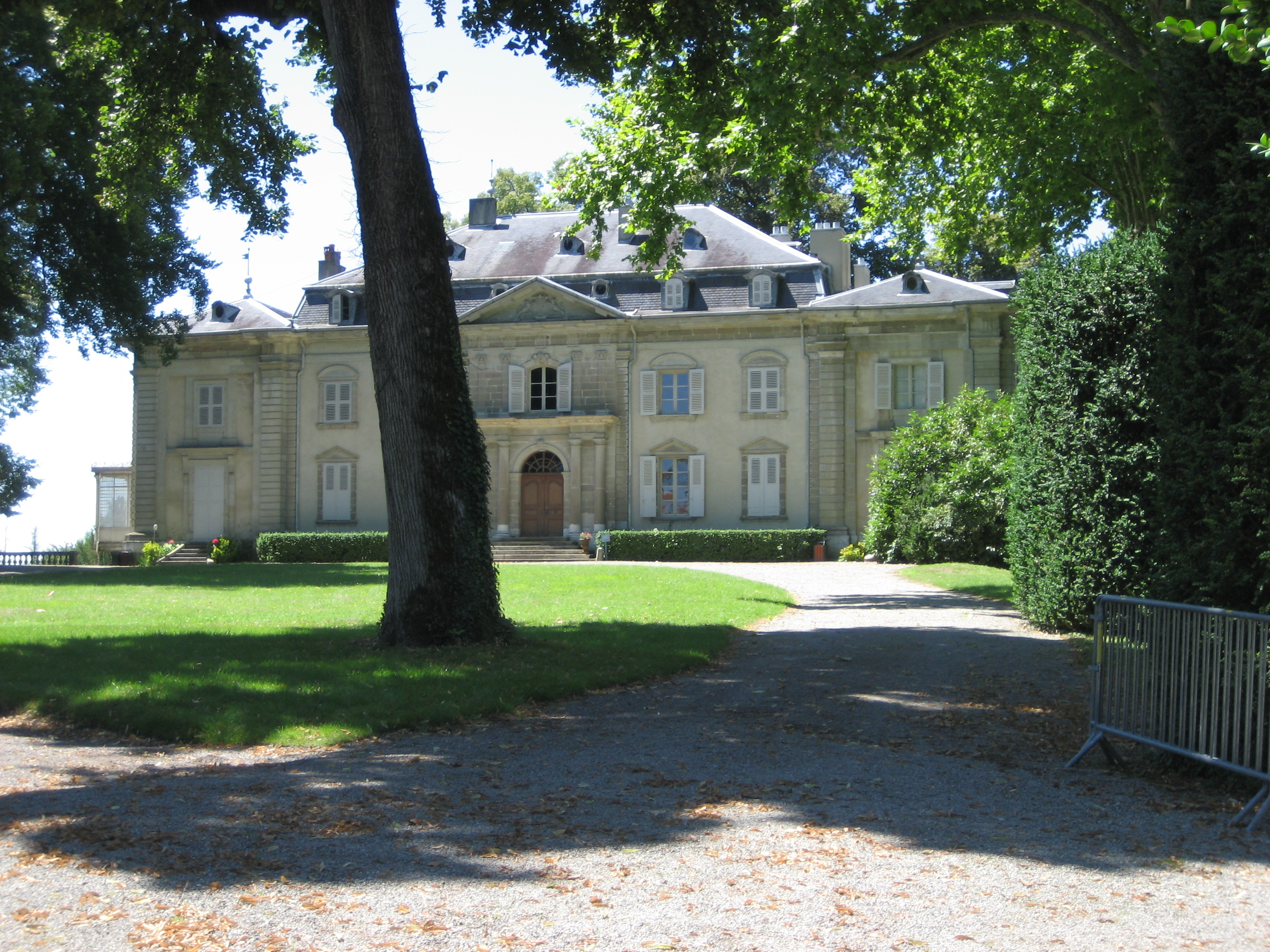
Voltaire's chateau

Ferney's main attraction is Voltaire's house (château), built 1758–66, now owned and administered by the Centre des monuments nationaux (an arm of the French Ministry of Culture). The chateau includes the main building, with a reconstruction of Voltaire's room (moved from its original location by later private owners), a garden with a fine view of the Alps, and a church dedicated, contrary to custom, directly to God. In the church's inscription, "Deo erexit VOLTAIRE" ("Erected to God by VOLTAIRE"), Voltaire's name is written in the largest characters.

A few dozen metres from the chateau is another impressive house, built in 1900 by Monsieur Lambert (the sculptor of the statue of Voltaire; his family owned the chateau before it was purchased by the French government). The house, now privately owned, had been used to store provisions and wine for the chateau, and to accommodate the household staff.

The village features 18th-century houses and artisans' workshops; a life-size statue of Voltaire; a smaller bust of him, surmounting a fountain; many restaurants, French and foreign; and proximity to the nearby cosmopolitan city of Geneva, Switzerland.

Every Saturday, a market is held in the main street of Ferney.

The old road at the centre of the village is a remnant of the time when Voltaire resided at the chateau in Ferney-Voltaire.

The pedestal of the Voltaire statue, erected in 1890, dedicates that memorial to the town's "benefactor", noting that he built over a hundred houses for the inhabitants, as well as a school and church, gave the town interest-free loans, and fed its inhabitants in time of need.

On 31 May 2018, Président Emmanuel Macron officially visited the Château for the re-opening after renovation.

== Personalities ==
- Harrikrisna Anenden (born 1947), film director
- Hina Aoyama (born 1970), paper-cutting artist and illustrator
- Saphia Azzeddine (born 1979), writer, actress and screenwriter
- Marie Louise Denis (1712–1790), a niece of Voltaire
- Ananda Devi (born 1957), writer
- Andy Johnson-Laird (born 1945), computer scientist
- Jean-Antoine Lépine (1720–1814), watchmaker
- Gaspard Mermillod (1824–1892), bishop, later cardinal
- Michel Meylan (1939–2020), politician
- Gilles Mirallès (1966–2022), chess player
- Antoine Porcel (1937–2014), boxer
- David Pujadas (b.1964), journalist and television host
- Brian Savegar (1932–2007), production designer
- Georges Vianès, mayor of Ferney-Voltaire from 1995 to 2001
- Jean-Louis Wagnière (1739–1802), Voltaire's secretary for over twenty years, later mayor of Ferney-Voltaire
- Nedd Willard (1926–2018), writer, artist and journalist

== Transportation ==
TPG Geneva Public Transport operates to and from Geneva to Ferney-Voltaire. Line Number 60 from Geneva, Cornavin to Gex, L'Aiglette and Line 66 from Geneve, Aeroport to Thoiry, Center Commercial. Les cars de region Line X33 also operates to Ferney from Bellegarde-sur-Valserine. Fare Zones are integrated with Unireso fare zones from Geneva.

== See also ==
- List of places named after people
- Communes of the Ain department
