= Haute-Savoie's 3rd constituency =

Constituency of the National Assembly of France

3rd constituency of Haute-Savoie
- inline Constituency of the National Assembly of France

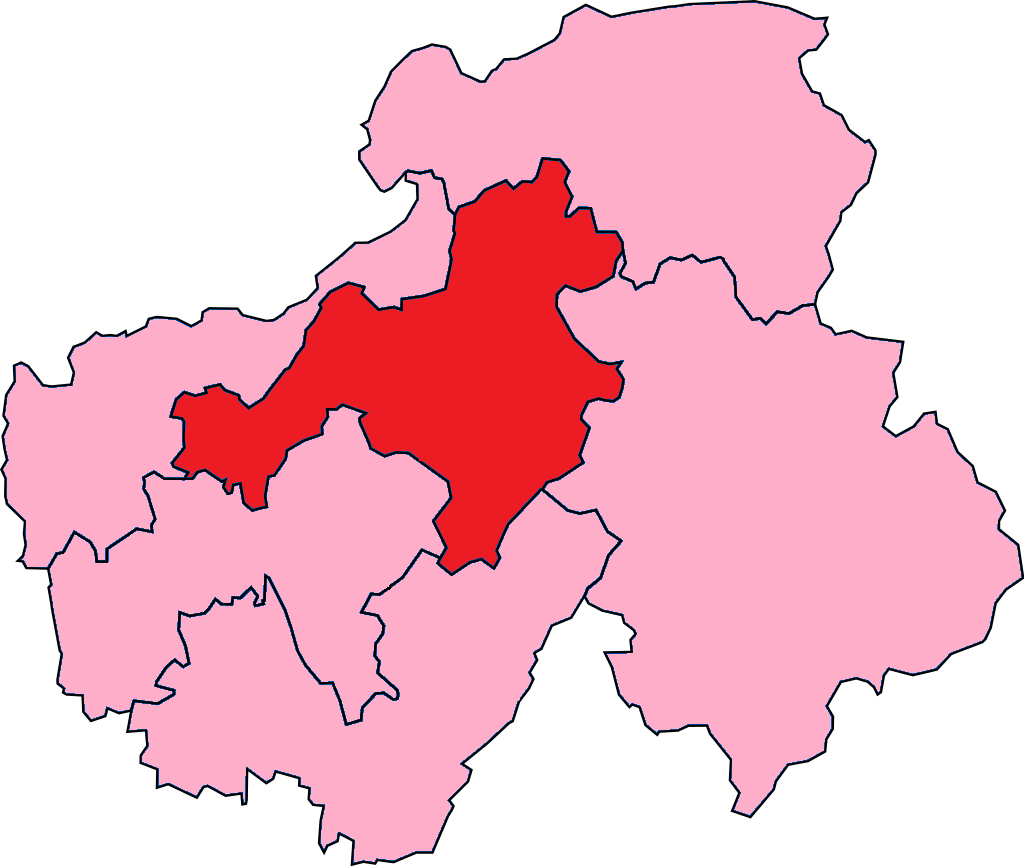
- Haute-Savoie's 3rd Constituency shown within Haute-Savoie
- Deputy: Antoine Valentin
- Department: Haute-Savoie
- Cantons: Boëge, Bonneville, Cruseilles, Reignier, La Roche-sur-Foron, Saint-Jeoire
- Registered voters: 81855

The 3rd constituency of the Haute-Savoie (French: Troisième circonscription de la Haute-Savoie) is a French legislative constituency in the Haute-Savoie département. Like the other 576 French constituencies, it elects one MP using a two round electoral system.

== Description ==
The 3rd constituency of Haute-Savoie covers a large central of the department to the north of Annecy.

The seat has a strong tendency towards the centre right and in 2017 was one of only two constituencies in Haute-Savoie that returned an LR deputy.

== Assembly Members ==
| Election | Member | Party |
|---|---|---|
| 1988 | Michel Meylan | UDF |
| 2012 | Martial Saddier | UMP |
| 2017 | Martial Saddier | LR |
| 2021 | Christelle Petex-Levet | LR |
| 2022 | Christelle Petex-Levet | LR |
| 2024 | Christelle Petex-Levet | DVD |
| 2026 | Antoine Valentin | UDR |

== Election results ==
=== 2026 ===
2026 by-election: Haute-Savoie's 3rd constituency
| Party | Candidate | Votes | % | ±% |
|---|---|---|---|---|
| UDR (UXD) | Antoine Valentin | 12,554 | 45.05 | +5.37 |
| LR | Christophe Fournier | 4,242 | 15.22 | −17.15 |
| Place Publique (DVG) | Anthony Penhouët | 3,749 | 13.45 | New |
| Solution démocratique | Boris Avouac | 2,158 | 7.74 | New |
| LFI | Nicolas Gavoille | 1,815 | 6.51 | −17.5 |
| Independent (DVC) | Yannick Duret | 1,114 | 4.00 | New |
| REC | Bruno Richard | 690 | 2.48 | New |
| Savoy Region Movement (REG) | Laurent Blondaz | 564 | 2.02 | −0.84 |
| LP (Far-right) | Patrick Garlatti | 476 | 1.71 | New |
| The Shift Project (DVE) | Pierre Destafano | 315 | 1.13 | New |
| 100% Savoie (DIV) | Isabelle Baud | 187 | 0.67 | New |
| Turnout | | 27,864 | 31.28 | |
| Registered electors | | 91,228 | | |
2nd round result
| UDR (UXD) | Antoine Valentin | 17,331 | 59.06 | +15.25 |
| LR | Christophe Fournier | 12,013 | 40.94 | −15.25 |
| Turnout | | 31,158 | 34.08 | |
| Registered electors | | 91,419 | | |
| UDR hold | | | | |

=== 2024 ===
Legislative Election 2024: Haute-Savoie's 3rd constituency
| Party | Candidate | Votes | % | ±% |
|---|---|---|---|---|
| LR (UXD) | Antoine Valentin | 19,726 | 32.37 | +13.98 |
| DVD | Christelle Petex | 19,726 | 32.37 | +9.36 |
| LFI (NFP) | Gérard Vez | 14,630 | 24.01 | −0.77 |
| REG | Véronique Bouvier | 1,742 | 2.86 | −0.55 |
| LO | Jocelyne Legouhy | 656 | 1.08 | n/a |
| Turnout | | 60,936 | 97.62 | +51.78 |
| Registered electors | | 89,948 | | |
2nd round result
| DVD | Christelle Petex-Levet | 33,738 | 56.19 | −7.17 |
| LR | Antoine Valentin | 26,309 | 43.81 | n/a |
| Turnout | | 60,047 | 96.26 | +51.07 |
| Registered electors | | 89,979 | | |
| DVD gain from LR | | Swing | | |

=== 2022 ===
Legislative Election 2022: Haute-Savoie's 3rd constituency
| Party | Candidate | Votes | % | ±% |
|---|---|---|---|---|
| LFI (NUPÉS) | Fabienne Vaneeckeloot-Tassa | 9,831 | 24.78 | +7.23 |
| LR (UDC) | Christelle Petex-Levet | 9,129 | 23.01 | -6.07 |
| LREM (Ensemble) | Valérie Ferrarini | 9,087 | 22.90 | −14.37 |
| RN | Anis Daghrir | 7,296 | 18.39 | +6.48 |
| REC | Sébastien Joannot | 1,513 | 3.81 | N/A |
| REG | Véronique Bouvier | 1,352 | 3.41 | +2.00 |
| Others | N/A | 1,470 | - | − |
| Turnout | | 39,678 | 45.84 | −0.29 |
2nd round result
| LR (UDC) | Christelle Petex-Levet | 23,882 | 63.36 | +11.86 |
| LFI (NUPÉS) | Fabienne Vaneeckeloot-Tassa | 13,812 | 36.64 | N/A |
| Turnout | | 37,694 | 45.19 | +5.66 |
| LR hold | | | | |

=== 2017 ===
Legislative Election 2017: Haute-Savoie's 3rd constituency
| Party | Candidate | Votes | % | ±% |
|---|---|---|---|---|
| LREM | Guillaume Gibouin | 13,894 | 37.27 | |
| LR | Martial Saddier | 10,842 | 29.08 | |
| FN | Nathale Genand | 4,441 | 11.91 | |
| LFI | Jacques Cambon | 4,024 | 10.79 | |
| EELV | Annie Collinet | 2,101 | 5.64 | |
| Others | N/A | 1,458 | | |
| Turnout | | 37,284 | 45.55 | |
2nd round result
| LR | Martial Saddier | 16,665 | 51.50 | |
| LREM | Guillaume Gibouin | 15,693 | 48.50 | |
| Turnout | | 32,358 | 39.53 | |
| LR hold | | | | |

=== 2012 ===
Legislative Election 2012: Haute-Savoie's 3rd constituency
| Party | Candidate | Votes | % | ±% |
|---|---|---|---|---|
| UMP | Martial Saddier | 14,952 | 35.61 | |
| EELV | Gilbert Saillet | 11,392 | 27.13 | |
| FN | Katia Terras | 6,012 | 14.32 | |
| PRV | Jean-Luc Arcade | 3,484 | 8.30 | |
| DVD | Jean-Marc Bouchet | 2,332 | 5.55 | |
| FG | Roland Pourraz | 1,782 | 4.24 | |
| Others | N/A | 2,031 | | |
| Turnout | | 41,985 | 55.86 | |
2nd round result
| UMP | Martial Saddier | 22,006 | 58.95 | |
| EELV | Gilbert Saillet | 15,324 | 41.05 | |
| Turnout | | 37,330 | 49.62 | |
| UMP hold | | | | |

=== 2007 ===
Legislative Election 2007: Haute-Savoie's 3rd constituency
| Party | Candidate | Votes | % | ±% |
|---|---|---|---|---|
| UMP | Martial Saddier | 25,862 | 54.78 | |
| PS | Sébastien Montessuit | 6,278 | 13.30 | |
| DVD | Jean-Marc Peillex | 4,439 | 9.40 | |
| MoDem | Angélique Ballet-Baz | 3,349 | 7.09 | |
| FN | Dominique Martin | 2,980 | 6.31 | |
| LV | Olivier Marouze | 1,791 | 3.79 | |
| Others | N/A | 2,510 | | |
| Turnout | | 47,706 | 55.06 | |
| UMP hold | | | | |

=== 2002 ===
Legislative Election 2002: Haute-Savoie's 3rd constituency
| Party | Candidate | Votes | % | ±% |
|---|---|---|---|---|
| UMP | Martial Saddier | 14,459 | 30.94 | |
| FN | Dominique Martin | 8,783 | 18.79 | |
| DVD | Éric Fournier | 8,642 | 18.49 | |
| LV | Martine Léger | 7,717 | 16.51 | |
| MPF | Alain Grevy | 2,105 | 4.50 | |
| PCF | Gilbert Perrin | 1,260 | 2.70 | |
| PR | Geneviève Joly | 978 | 2.09 | |
| Others | N/A | 2,788 | | |
| Turnout | | 47,381 | 60.69 | |
2nd round result
| UMP | Martial Saddier | 27,537 | 75.17 | |
| FN | Dominique Martin | 9,095 | 24.83 | |
| Turnout | | 39,601 | 50.73 | |
| UMP gain from UDF | | | | |

=== 1997 ===
Legislative Election 2022:
| Party | Candidate | Votes | % | ±% |
|---|---|---|---|---|
| UDF | Michel Meylan | 14,932 | 36.56 | |
| FN | Dominique Martin | 10,185 | 24.94 | |
| PS | Fernand Gannaz | 6,694 | 16.39 | |
| LV | Gilles Maistre | 2,958 | 7.24 | |
| PCF | Modeste Rigot | 2,520 | 6.17 | |
| GE | Tanguy Perrin | 1,348 | 3.30 | |
| MRC | Geneviève Joly | 1,288 | 3.15 | |
| DIV | Alain Tacquet | 916 | 2.24 | |
| Turnout | | 44,388 | 62.63 | |
2nd round result
| UDF | Michel Meylan | 27,603 | 71.05 | |
| FN | Dominique Martin | 11,249 | 28.95 | |
| Turnout | | 45,190 | 63.76 | |
| UDF hold | | | | |
