= Christelle Petex-Levet =

French politician

Member of the National Assembly for Haute-Savoie's 3rd constituency
- In office 1 August 2021 – 6 November 2025
- Preceded by: Martial Saddier
- Succeeded by: Antoine Valentin

Personal details
- Born: 2 September 1980 (age 45) Annecy, France
- Party: Republican

Christelle Petex-Levet (born 2 September 1980 in Annecy) is a French politician who served as Member of Parliament for Haute-Savoie's 3rd constituency from 2021 to 2025.

== Political career ==
In parliament, Petex-Levet served on the Sustainable Development, Spatial and Regional Planning Committee.

In the 2022 French legislative election, Petex-Levet narrowly avoided elimination in the first round. She won a landslide in the second round against the NUPES candidate. She was re-elected on 7 July 2024. On 6 November 2025, Petex-Levet announced her resignation from Parliament.

In the run-up to the Republicans’ 2022 convention, Petex-Levet endorsed Éric Ciotti as the party's chairman.

== See also ==
- Women in the French National Assembly
