= Lycée international de Ferney-Voltaire =

School in Ferney-Voltaire, France

Coordinates: 46.2643°N 6.1162°E

Lycée international de Ferney-Voltaire is a public secondary school in Ferney-Voltaire, Ain, Auvergne-Rhône-Alpes, France. The school serves junior high school (collège) and senior high school/sixth form college (lycée) students. It has a branch campus in Saint-Genis-Pouilly.

The school has British, Dutch, German, Italian, Spanish, and Swedish sections. In addition to Ferney-Voltaire and Saint-Genis-Pouilly, it serves Prévessin-Moëns.

As of 2018 it had about 1,000 junior high students and 1,655 senior high/sixth-form students, making a total of about 2,655 students.

== History ==
It was established with 28 6ème students in 1961 as the Collège d’enseignement général de Ferney-Voltaire, becoming the Collège d’enseignement secondaire municipal de Ferney-Voltaire in 1970. The following year its 2nd class opened with 70 students, and the school was nationalised in 1972. It was made an international school by decree of 21 March 1978. Its current main campus opened in 1983. A senior high expansion and boarding facility opened in 1992.

The Saint Genis Pouilly branch campus opened in 2016. it is in the Porte de France Nord development and occupies 13,000 square metres (140,000 sq ft).
