= Éric Fournier =

French politician (born 1965)

Mayor of Chamonix
- Incumbent
- Assumed office 16 March 2008
- Preceded by: Michel Charlet

Personal details
- Born: 13 April 1965 (age 61)
- Party: Union of Democrats and Independents

Éric Fournier (born 13 April 1965) is a French politician serving as mayor of Chamonix since 2008. He concurrently serves as president of Vallée de Chamonix-Mont-Blanc since 2010. He is a member of the Regional Council of Auvergne-Rhône-Alpes, and has served as special advisor for air, climate and energy since 2021. In the 2002 legislative election, he was a candidate for Haute-Savoie's 3rd constituency.
