= Saint-Genis-Pouilly =

Commune in Auvergne-Rhône-Alpes, France

Saint Genis-Pouilly Sant-Genés-Polyi (Arpitan)
- Commune
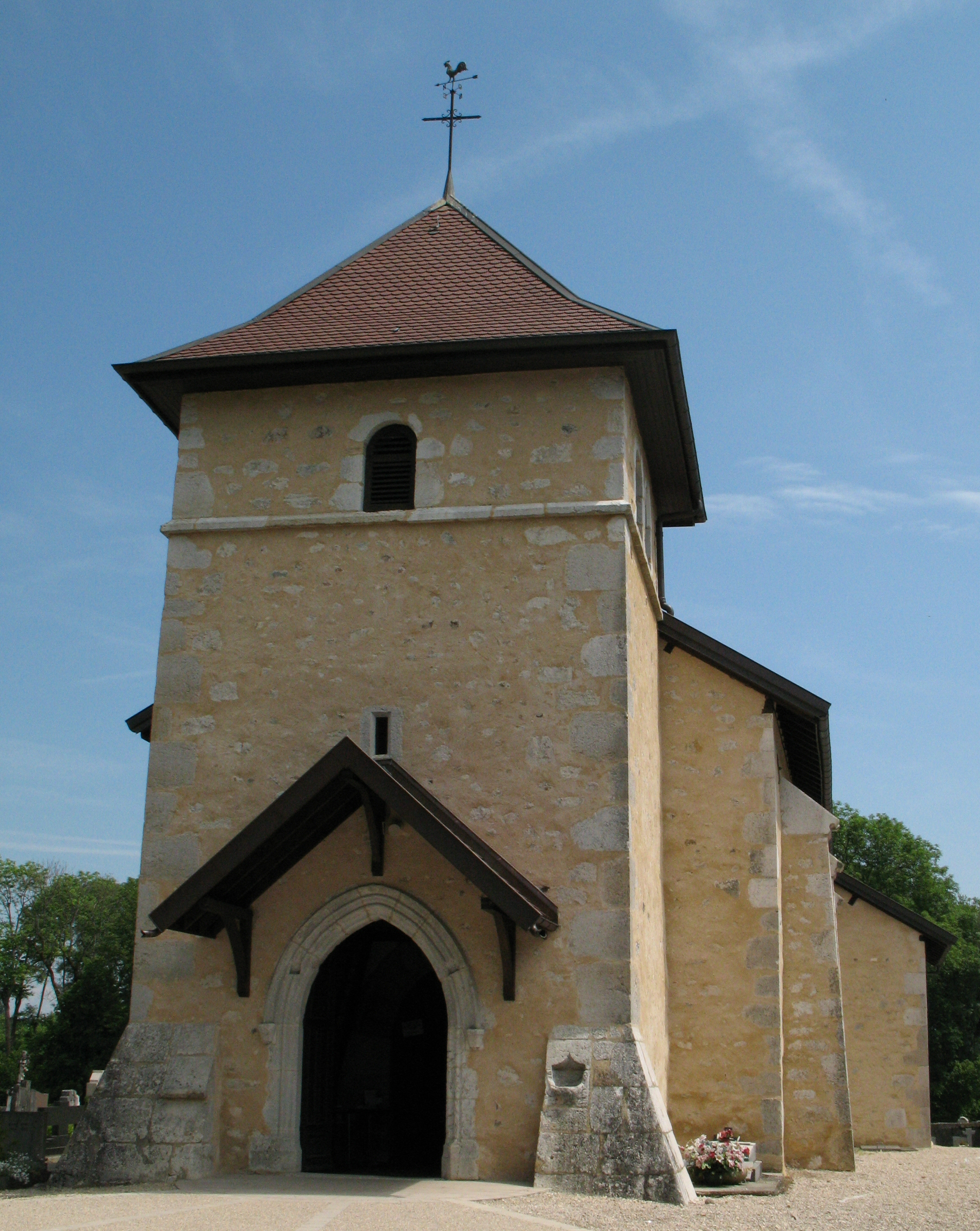

- Coat of arms
- Location of Saint Genis-Pouilly
- Location within France Location within Auvergne-Rhône-Alpes
- Coordinates: 46°14′37″N 6°01′30″E
- Country: France
- Region: Auvergne-Rhône-Alpes
- Department: Ain
- Arrondissement: Gex
- Canton: Saint-Genis-Pouilly
- Intercommunality: CA Pays de Gex

Government
  - Mayor (2026–32): Sylvie Durand
- Area^{1}: 9.77 km^{2} (3.77 sq mi)
- Elevation: 450 m (1,480 ft)
- Highest elevation: 502 m (1,647 ft)
- Lowest elevation: 419 m (1,375 ft)
- Population (2023): 14,432
  - Density: 1,480/km^{2} (3,830/sq mi)
- Time zone: UTC+01:00 (CET)
  - Summer (DST): UTC+02:00 (CEST)
- INSEE/Postal code: 01354 /01630
- Dialling codes: 0450
- ^{1} French Land Register data, which excludes lakes, ponds, glaciers > 1 km^{2} (0.386 sq mi or 247 acres) and river estuaries.

Saint-Genis-Pouilly (French pronunciation: [sɛ̃ ʒəni puji]; Arpitan: Sant-Genés-Polyi) is a commune in the Ain department within the Auvergne-Rhône-Alpes region of eastern France.

It is located in the Pays de Gex, at the foot of the Jura Mountains. Bordering the Swiss frontier, it is part of the cross-border area of Geneva. With a population of over 14,000 inhabitants (2023), it is the fifth most populous commune in the department of Ain.

A large portion of CERN, the European laboratory for particle physics, is located within the territory of Saint-Genis-Pouilly; the ALICE experiment is located on the periphery of the town, and the French entrance to the primary CERN campus (Meyrin) and the ATLAS experiment are located only 3 km from the centre of St Genis. CERN is the world's largest fundamental physics research laboratory and its presence has largely been responsible for the development of the community of Saint Genis since the middle of the 1960s.

== Geography ==
Saint-Genis-Pouilly is composed of two market towns (Saint-Genis and Pouilly) and two hamlets (Pregnin and Flies). The two market towns have both continued to expand and now practically merge into one, however the two hamlets still remain separate from each other and from the two towns. The elevation of the commune varies from 419 m (at the extreme south of the commune, to the confluence of the rivers Allondon and Nant de l'Ecra) to 502 m (at the extreme north of the commune, in the village of Flies). The commune is situated at the limit between the plains surrounding Geneva and the first foothills of the Jura. As indicated on the map opposite, the communes surrounding Saint-Genis-Pouilly are: Thoiry, Sergy, Crozet, Chevry, Prévessin-Moëns and Satigny (Swiss).

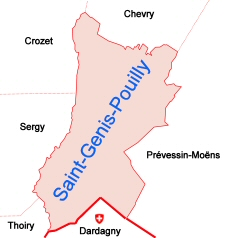
Communes bordering Saint-Genis-Pouilly

=== Hydrology ===
Many water courses traverse or border Saint-Genis-Pouilly: Lion, Allondon, Nant de l'Ecra, Bief de la Janvoin, Ouaf, Grand Journans and Petit Journans. In 2005 and 2006, these water courses were subject to a ban on water extraction as a result of the drought. In 2004, only the Allondon and the Lion would have been restricted. The depth of the Allondon is measured at Saint-Genis-Pouilly by a network HYDRO station which transmits these readings by telephone.

=== Climate ===
The meteorological station situated at Geneva International Airport, Cointrin, furnishes measurements of the weather relevant to Saint-Genis-Pouilly. This station is situated only 6.5 km from the centre of the commune and at a similar elevation (420 m). Data from this station is available in real time from MétéoSuisse.

Saint-Genis-Pouilly, like the whole of the Pays de Gex and the Canton of Geneva, knows the touch of the Joran, the cold wind which descends towards Lac Léman from the high Jura, where it sometimes provokes a storm.

=== Natural risks ===
According to a study made in 2002, commissioned by the Department of Agriculture and the Forests of Ain, Saint-Genis-Pouilly is classed in a zone at risk from flooding. According to another official publication, the commune is classed in a zone at risk from torrential downpours and rapid flooding. However, according to the list of major risks to Saint-Genis-Pouilly published on the portal of the website of the Ministry of Ecology, "Prevention of major risks", the commune is classed in a zone at risk from overcrowding from man's activities. These three different qualifications of risk cannot be explained.

Along with the other communes in the canton of Gex, Saint-Genis-Pouilly is classed in seismic zone Ib, which is to say that the seismic risk is low. A new classification is being prepared by the Ministry of Ecology, but it does not seem that this will significantly change the classification of the communes in the Pays de Gex.

=== Nature zones ===
That part of the Allondon valley which is found within the territory of the commune constitutes a natural zone with interesting ecology, fauna and flora (ZNIEFF type I).

The commune is sparsely wooded: the area occupied by forests is 7%.

== History ==
It was in 1887 that the current name, Saint-Genis-Pouilly, first appeared on the State civil registers. Previously, Saint-Genis-Pouilly was called Pouilly-Saint-Genis. Before that, the two towns were separately identified. Historically the spelling Saint-Genix had been widely used.

In his historical Atlas, G. Debombourg placed Pulliacum in the epoque of the second reign of the Bourgogne (879-1032) and he placed the church of Pouilly-St-Genis on the religious maps. In these "Preuves" he cites a text of 993 which mentions Pulliacum.

A diary of 1698 mentions a certain Balthazard as a noble of Prengin, in the Pays de Gex (perhaps this is the name given during this epoque to the current hamlet of Pregnin). Between 1601 and 1789 mention is made of the Baronnie of Saint-Genist.

Names of the area with a Gallo-Romanic origin, Polliacum, Pulliacum, derived, with the suffix -acum from the root name Paulius or Pollius.

Towards the end of this time, Saint Genis took on a greater importance. Its takeover of the Postes Royales (next to the current chapel) kickstarted the growth of the town and Pouilly-Saint-Genix soon became Saint-Genis-Pouilly.

Pregnin figures in the Procès-verbaux du Directoire. The name of Saint-Genis, as in the case of Saint-Genis-Laval, probably comes from Saint Genest, a Roman comedian from the second half of the 3rd century, martyred under Diocletian.

=== Roman period ===
The Roman colony Colonia Iulia Equestris founded by Julius Caesar between 50 and 45 BC extended as far as Thoiry and included the territory which was to become Saint-Genis-Pouilly.

The villa of Pouilly had been occupied by a rich family, as evidenced by the jewelry found there.

The place called les châtelets, situated to the north of Pregnin took its name, without doubt, from the presence in the 2nd century of a small fort situated on the Roman road running along the Jura.

=== Middle Ages ===
A priory was established at Pouilly at the end of the 10th century.

In 1301, Uldric, the Seigneur of Saint-Genis renewed his allegiance to the Dauphin.

=== 18th century ===
Cassini's map of 18th century Geneva, based on measurements taken by Calon de Felcourt between 1759 and 1761, shows the town of Pouilly and the hamlets of Pregnin and Flies. A windmill on the site of St Genis can also be identified. The road from Lyon to Geneva and the fork towards Gex are also clearly visible. These roads, easily identifiable by the route they trace through the Pays de Gex, still exist today.

=== Notable events ===
A few (albeit rather rare) events in the history of the commune :

Year	Event
1590	The château of Pouilly was destroyed by order of the Conseils.
1591	The Spanish army of Don Olivaros sacked the Pays de Gex with sword and fire.
1601	As part of the Pays de Gex, Saint-Genis-Pouilly was reattached to France. Restoration of the fiefdom of Saint-Genix by Françoise of Lambert.
1662	The Protestant temple of Pouilly was destroyed on 30 November by order of the Evêque of Geneva.
1722	The Seigneurie of Saint-Genix was ceded to the Evêque and the Prince of Geneva.
1887	First mention of Saint-Genis-Pouilly as the name of the commune.

=== Today ===
It was the extension within France of CERN (the European Organization for Nuclear Research) in the middle of the 1960s which made Saint-Genis-Pouilly the little town ("coquette") that it is today. It is also thanks to the presence of CERN that the local economy has undergone considerable growth and diversification.

== Coat of arms ==
Until recently, the commune used an azure coat of arms with three gold towers. Today, the commune uses exclusively a modern logo which figures prominently on the pages of its website and in its publications.

== Population ==
The population of Saint-Genis-Pouilly has grown rapidly since the middle of the 1960s, largely due to the activities of CERN:

Historical population

Year	Pop.	±% p.a.
1936	639	—
1946	612	−0.43%
1954	647	+0.70%
1962	904	+4.27%
1968	2,030	+14.43%
1975	3,549	+8.31%
1982	4,631	+3.87%

Year	Pop.	±% p.a.
1990	5,696	+2.62%
1999	6,383	+1.27%
2007	8,130	+3.07%
2012	9,415	+2.98%
2017	12,544	+5.91%
2023	14,432	+2.36%

Source: EHESS and INSEE

One of the consequences of this rapid expansion of the population (along with those of the neighbouring communes in France and Switzerland) is the rapid increase in house prices. For example, the price per square metre of an apartment in the Pays de Gex increased by 59% between 2000 and 2004, according to INSEE.

Its inhabitants are known as Saint-genésiens.

=== An international population ===
In addition to CERN, the proximity of Switzerland and the international organisations headquartered in Geneva explains why a significant proportion of the population of the commune are foreigners. According to the census taken by INSEE in 2017, the commune contained amongst its 12,544 inhabitants 4,418 foreigners (making 35.2%). By way of comparison, the département of Ain contains, also in 2017, amongst its 643,350 inhabitants 56,160 foreigners (making 8.7%).

== Housing ==
As of 2017, most housing in Saint-Genis-Pouilly is in apartment blocks (70.9%) and individual houses (27.5%). The apartment blocks are concentrated in the town of Saint-Genis. The commune has a significantly larger proportion of apartments than the other communes in the department: 35.5% of dwellings in Ain are apartments.

The majority of the population in the Pays de Gex, Ain, the Rhône-Alpes region, and mainland France are owner-occupiers of their homes. In Saint-Genis-Pouilly, by contrast, the majority of the population live in rented accommodation (only 46.3% of individual residences are owner-occupied). Within the Pays de Gex, only Ferney-Voltaire has a lower proportion of owner occupiers (39.1%). It is possible that this peculiarity is explained by the large number of employees living in the two communities who work for international organisations.

== Administration ==
=== Elections ===
The commune is presently administered by Mme S. Durand and her team. The results of the first round of the municipal elections on 15 March 2026 was as follows:

Party	Head of party	Votes	%
Pour Saint-Genis-Pouilly	S. Durand	1425	52,9
Vision Commune Saint-Genis-Pouilly	H. Bertrand	850	31,6
Saint Genis Pouilly notre commune, notre avenir	G. Catherin	419	15,6

In total, from the 6,145 registered electors, there were 2,724 votes cast and 2,694 votes counted.

=== Municipal budget ===
The commune expended in 2005 a total revenue spend of €6.64 million and a total capital investment of €4.06 million, however these figures have increased to €7.96 million (revenue) and €3.69 million (capital). It has therefore reached an overall positive result of €0.96 million this year. At 31 December 2005, Saint-Genis-Pouilly was indebted to the amount of only € 2.12 million, being €288 per inhabitant (the communes of between 5,000 and 10,000 inhabitants — (la strate) — had an average debt of €935 per inhabitant). Whereas the receipts from the "taxe professionnelle" have been weak: €0.53 million (equivalent to €72 per inhabitant against the average of the (strate) of €211 per inhabitant).

=== Local taxation ===
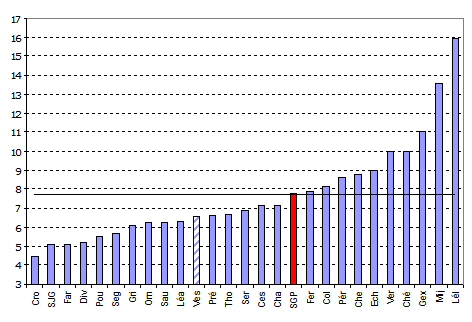
Rate of Taxe d'habitation in effect within the Pays de Gex in 2006 (Saint-Genis-Pouilly in red)

For several years the rate of the Taxe d'habititation (local council tax) has been fixed at 7.78%. As indicated on the chart opposite this rate was, in 2006, approximately equal to the average for the Pays de Gex: 7.69%.

=== Cantonal elections ===
Election	Ward	Title	Name	Date
Municipales	Saint-Genis-Pouilly	Maire	H. Bertrand	18 March 2001
Cantonales	Ferney-Voltaire	Conseiller général	J. Boch	28 March 2004
Législatives	Ain - 3^{ème}	Député	E. Blanc	16 June 2002

=== National referendums ===
For the referendum on the Treaty establishing a constitution for Europe, on 29 May 2005, 1,865 of the 3,089 electors who voted and the 1,838 (suffrages) expressed on this occasion which were reported in the following manner: 1,087 Yes (59.14%) and 751 No (40.86%).

For the referendum on the Treaty of Maastricht, on 20 September 1992, 1,814 of the2,576 electors who voted and the 1,774 (suffrages) expressed on this occasion which were reported in the following manner: 1,186 Yes (66.85%) and 588 No (33.15%).

The inhabitants of Saint-Genis-Pouilly are therefore more europhile than the rest of the French population who rejected the Treaty establishing a constitution for Europe, and approved by only a slim majority (51.04%) the Treaty of Maastricht.

Note: Unless indicated otherwise, the results presented above are taken from the Ministry of the Interior.

== Cultural life ==
=== Heritage ===
The church of Saint Pierre at Pouilly (porch and choir from the 13th century) is without doubt the most well known element of religious architecture in the commune. The church is Roman, except for the choir which is Gothic.

Some ruins from the small fortified château (from 13th century) are still visible in Flies. Gallo-Roman sepulchres and others from the 6th-8th centuries can still be found in the cemetery surrounding the church at Pouilly.

=== Science ===
The town is home to a portion of the CERN centre. Conferences are very frequently organised and some of these are open to the public. It is possible to visit the exhibition centre at CERN and also, with a prior appointment, to make a half day visit to CERN itself.

=== Theatre ===
The Théâtre du Bordeau offers a 250-seat auditorium for use by amateur dramatic groups, dance, music and other dramatic arts.

=== Sculpture and related subjects ===
Pregn'Art is an annual weekend event in the course of which several local artists exhibit their work in the gardens of the inhabitants of the hamlet of Pregnin. It is one of the events dedicated to sculpture and related subjects.

=== Traditions and folklore ===
The principal fete of the commune is the Bird Festival "La fête de l'oiseau", which took place between 4 and 7 June on 2010.

=== Recreation ===
The municipal swimming pool is the Piscine municipale de Saint-Genis.

== Economic life ==
Since the creation of the Technoparc, Saint-Genis-Pouilly has become a centre of economic activity in the Pays de Gex.

=== Free trade zone ===
Saint-Genis-Pouilly benefits, as do all the other communes in the Pays de Gex, from the specific laws implementing the free trade zone. Under this arrangement, merchandise imported or exported to and from the European Union is not subject to customs duty. If this law has known important changes in the past, it seems to have stabilised today.

=== Unemployment ===
According to the annual employment survey carried out by INSEE in 2017, the unemployment rate in the commune was 10.2% (compared to 8.3% in 2007).

== Education ==
Preschool and primary school groups include Groupe scolaire du Jura, Groupe scolaire du Lion, Groupe scolaire de Pregnin, and Groupe scolaire Boby Lapointe.

The local junior high school is Collège Jacques Prévert, it opened in 1974 whilst using the École du Lion facilities and moved into its permanent facility in 1975.

Lycée international de Ferney-Voltaire has a branch campus in Saint-Genis-Pouilly, which opened in 2016. it is in the Porte de France Nord development.

Médiathèque George Sand, which has media for rental, is in the commune.
