= Martial Saddier =

French politician (born 1969)

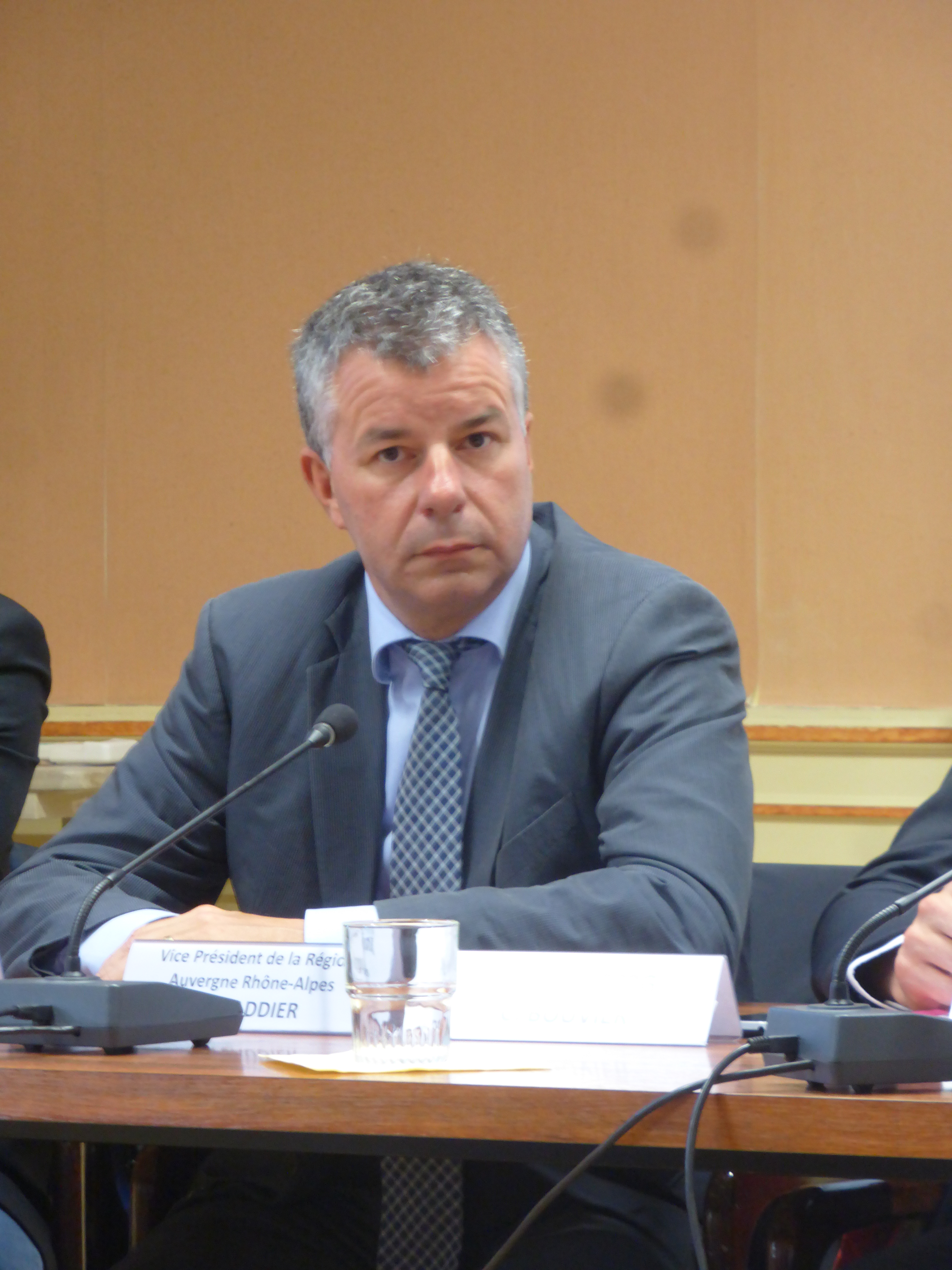
- Saddier in 2016

President of the Departmental Council of Haute-Savoie
- Incumbent
- Assumed office 1 July 2021
- Preceded by: Christian Monteil

Member of the National Assembly for Haute-Savoie's 3rd constituency
- In office 19 June 2002 – 31 July 2021
- Preceded by: Michel Meylan
- Succeeded by: Christelle Petex-Levet

Mayor of Bonneville
- In office 19 March 2001 – 16 December 2015
- Preceded by: Michel Meylan
- Succeeded by: Stéphane Valli

Personal details
- Born: 15 October 1969 (age 55); Bonneville, France
- Political party: Liberal Democracy (until 2002); Union for a Popular Movement (2002–2015); The Republicans (2015–present)

Martial Saddier (French pronunciation: [maʁsjal sadje]; born 15 October 1969) is a French politician who represented the 3rd constituency of the Haute-Savoie department in the National Assembly from 2002 to 2021. A member of The Republicans (LR), he left Parliament after he was elected President of the Departmental Council of Haute-Savoie, in which he has held a seat since 2021 for the canton of Bonneville.

== Political career ==
He was elected as a deputy on June 16, 2002, for the XII legislature (2002–2007), representing the third constituency of Haute-Savoie, succeeding Michel Meylan. He was part of the UMP group. He was re-elected as a deputy on June 10, 2007, in the first round, with 54.78% of the votes.

On June 17, 2012, he was re-elected as a deputy in the second round, obtaining 58.95% of the votes against EELV candidate Gilbert Saillet with 41.05%.

On December 9, 2014, Nicolas Sarkozy, elected president of the UMP, appointed him as national secretary of the UMP in charge of industry and SMEs.

He ran again in the 2017 legislative elections and won in the second round with 51.50% against La République en Marche candidate Guillaume Gibouin. To comply with the law on the non-accumulation of mandates, he resigned from his position as vice-president of the Auvergne-Rhône-Alpes regional council.

In November 2018, he was appointed as the ecology and sustainable development coordinator for the Republicans within Laurent Wauquiez's shadow cabinet.

On July 1, 2021, he was elected president of the Haute-Savoie Departmental Council.

He resigned from his position as deputy effective July 31, 2021, to comply with the rules on the accumulation of mandates.
