= Michel Meylan =

French politician (1939–2020)

Mayor of Bonneville
- In office 1983–2001
- Succeeded by: Martial Saddier

Member of the French National Assembly for Haute-Savoie's 3rd constituency
- In office 23 June 1988 – 18 June 2002
- Preceded by: position established
- Succeeded by: Martial Saddier

Personal details
- Born: 27 January 1939 Ferney-Voltaire, France
- Died: 3 July 2020 (aged 81) Saint-Pierre-en-Faucigny, France
- Party: UDF

Michel Meylan (27 January 1939 – 3 July 2020) was a French politician.

== Biography ==
In 1955, at the age of 15, Meylan organized a trip for his Scouting troop to attend the World Scout Jamboree in Canada. Forty years later, he created the Amicale parlementaire scoute in France, which he chaired. This helped him attend meetings with other international scouting organizations in Guadalajara, Manila, and Warsaw.

In 1959, Meylan began fighting in the Algerian War. He obtained the rank of second lieutenant following his training. He used his military service to his advantage in his political career as a member of the Cultural, Family and Social Affairs Committee in the National Assembly. He started his political career with the Independent Republicans (RI) party, which his family had been a part of for over 70 years. However, when he was elected as Mayor of Bonneville and represented Haute-Savoie's 3rd constituency in the National Assembly, he was a member of the Union for French Democracy (UDF).

As Mayor of Bonneville, Meylan developed the commune's business district and established the first municipal employment center in France. Meylan created sister cities of Bonneville, such as Racconigi in Italy and Téra in Niger. The move with Téra helped improve Franco-Nigerien relations and human development improved in the African city.

In 1997, Meylan made a controversial statement in the National Assembly amidst a debate on the civil solidarity pact, saying "If there are queers here, I piss them off".

Michel Meylan died on 3 July 2020 at the age of 81.
