= Pregnin =

Coordinates: 46.2636°N 6.0394°E

Pregnin is a hamlet administratively part of the Saint-Genis-Pouilly commune in the Ain département, France. It is 2.6 km (1.6 mi) from the Swiss border, and 10.4 km (6.5 mi) from downtown Geneva. It is also home Les Lutins de Pregnin, an organisation that funds local schools and organises community events.
