= Hina Aoyama =

Japanese artist

Hina Aoyama (蒼山日菜) (born December 27, 1970, in Yokohama, Japan) is a Japanese paper-cutting artist and illustrator. She has been creating super fine lacy-paper-cuttings since 2000. Aoyama currently lives and works in Ferney-Voltaire, France.

== Art style ==
Hina Aoyama is a paper-cutting artist whose work reflects influences from both Switzerland and Japan. She is known for developing a distinctive paper-silhouette style characterized by intricate, lace-like designs. Using only scissors and paper, she produces highly detailed compositions that differ from traditional paper-cutting techniques.

Her works are typically small and delicate, often requiring extended periods of time to complete, ranging from hours to several months. Aoyama’s subject matter frequently draws on motifs from nature, including butterflies, trees, and flowers, and is often described as romantic or reminiscent of fairy tales. In addition to these themes, she has created collections of typographic paper cutouts featuring elaborate lettering and decorative visual effects.

== Works ==
Aoyama believes that art is “the best psychiatrist in the world”, is calming, and leads people through the five senses and then through the sixth. She rarely writes the concepts for each of her individual works as she would like her audience to interpret and give meaning to her work. The concept of her cutting out words of Voltaire and Baudelaire, although she respects them, is not because she is interested in their works or poetry, but because she is attracted to their personality and their lives. She thought Baudelaire had successfully carried out his intentions in his work through his contempts. She believes that people from the past have something that our society lacks today, and that is to “carry out [the] intention” that one wants to convey. Aoyama’s creations are to remember the delicate lives of nature and to preserve the liveliness of all the beautiful lives through her black and white artwork. Through her paper and scissors, she draws out the meaning of life, death, and rebirth. When Aoyama pictures flowers, she imagines its sensations with black and white, an ”Aoyama style photography”. Aoyama thinks of how lovely the flowers once are and realizes that the flowers will all die down someday. No one can show how beautiful those flowers are at that moment, not even photos. Her art pieces with butterflies are to show her feelings towards those who collect them just for their desires, and also protesting for the animals who are killed only to become stuffed specimens or fur. She is looking for empathy for the deaths, therefore wants to “recreate the earth” with her paper creatures and see the pureness and beauty that was lost today. She wishes people can take a minute and forget about their pains and worries and just take a moment and look at her works, she believes that art exists for moment. Aoyama also believes that there is no reason to find the meaning of life; people “achieve happiness” when they go with what is coming at them and take the chance to live a life with things that they devote to, having the “passion within your spirit.”

== Awards ==
- 2008: Le Grand Prix International ≪ PAPER ART ≫ Museum Charmey Swiss, first prize
- 2007: Le Salon des Contemporains
- 2007: Honfleur, second prize
- 2007: Triennal Palmares du Grand Prix des Distinctions Francais et Etrangers, Silver medal
- 2006: Le Grand Prix International M.C.A Cannes-Azur, Gold medal
- 2007: Le Grand Prix International M.C.A Cannes-Azur, Gold medal

== Collections ==
- Museum of Miniatures, Lyon, France
- Consulat Royal de Thaïlande, Geneva, Switzerland

== Exhibitions ==
- Berkshire Museum presents PaperWorks: The Art and Science of an Extraordinary Material, Pittsfield, Massachusetts, United States
- Gallery Kawada, Kobe, Japan
- Arts Rush, Tokyo, Japan
