= Xavier Roseren =

French politician

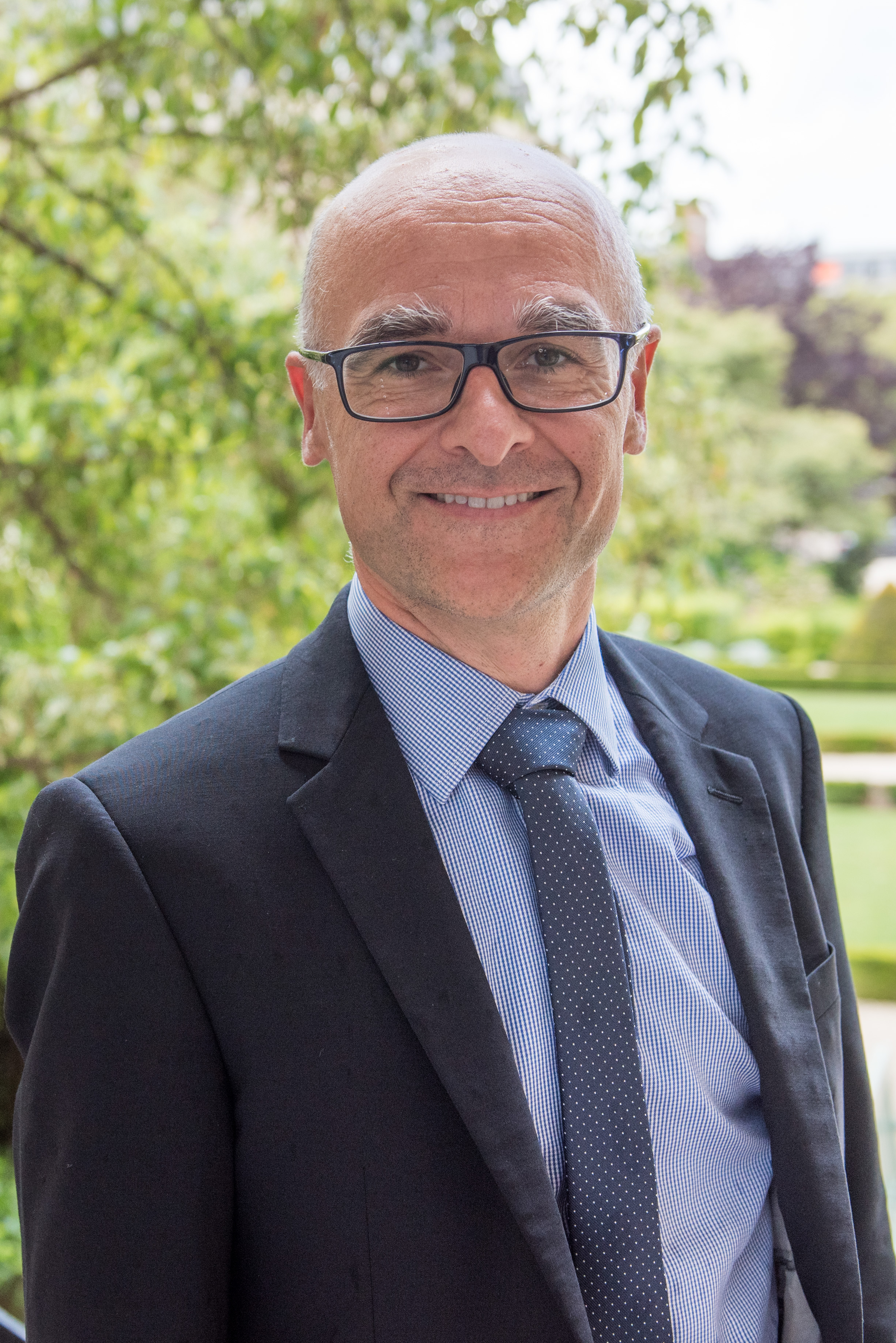

Member of the National Assembly for Haute-Savoie's 6th constituency
- In office 21 June 2017 – 9 June 2024
- Preceded by: Sophie Dion

Mayor of Les Houches
- In office 29 March 2014 – 11 July 2017
- Preceded by: Patrick Dole
- Succeeded by: Maurice Desailloud

Deputy Mayor of Les Houches
- In office 2001–2014

Personal details
- Born: 12 January 1970 (age 56) Chamonix, France
- Party: La République En Marche! Union of Democrats and Independents
- Education: Grenoble Alpes University; Savoy Mont Blanc University
- Profession: Shopkeeper

Xavier Roseren (born 12 January 1970) is a French politician and shopkeeper who has served as a member of the French National Assembly for Haute-Savoie's 6th constituency from 2017 to 2024. He is affiliated with La République En Marche (LREM).

== Early life ==
Xavier Roseren was born in Chamonix, France as the youngest child in a large family. He grew up in Les Houches and studied at the college-Lycée Saint-Michel. Roseren then attended Grenoble Alpes University, graduating with a General University Studies Degree (DEUG) in applied mathematics and social sciences. This was followed by a licentiate and a master's degree in commercial engineering from the University Institute of Technology at Savoy Mont Blanc University in Annecy.

In 1998, Roseren became the co-manager of a sports store in Les Houches alongside his brother. He is involved in his local community, serving as a volunteer for several years at the Ultra-Trail du Mont-Blanc in 2006.

== Political career ==
Roseren became deputy mayor of Les Houches in 2001 and vice-president of the Community of Communes of the Chamonix Valley and 2009. He was elected mayor of Les Houches in the 2014 French municipal elections as a member of the Union of Democrats and Independents (UDI), serving until June 2017.

In June 2017, Roseren endorsed Emmanuel Macron in the 2017 French presidential election, arguing that he would reconnect politics with the lives of citizens. Roseren was, in return, nominated by Macron's La République En Marche (LREM) in Haute-Savoie's 6th constituency for that year's legislative elections. He was elected to the National Assembly with 56.5% of the vote in the second round, defeating incumbent deputy Sophie Dion of The Republicans.

In the National Assembly, Roseren focuses on issues surrounding tourism, industry, air quality, urban development and agriculture. He sits on the Finance Committee and the Committee of the Massif of the Alps, and also serves as the co-president of the Montagne Study Group and the vice-president of the Air and Health Study Group. In addition to his committee assignments, Roseren is part of the French-Italian Parliamentary Friendship Group and the French-Nepalese Parliamentary Friendship Group. He has also been appointed special rapporteur of the Economy and Business Development mission.

In July 2019, Roseren unsuccessfully ran for the office of quaestor of the National Assembly.

Roseren successfully ran for re-election in the 2022 French legislative elections. He defeated former Member of the European Parliament Dominique Martin of the National Rally in the second round, winning 63.11% of the vote.

== Political positions ==
In July 2019, Roseren decided not to align with the majority of his party and became one of 52 LREM deputies who abstained from a vote on the French ratification of the European Union’s Comprehensive Economic and Trade Agreement (CETA) with Canada.

== Personal life ==
Roseren is married and has two children. He lives in Passy in the department of Haute-Savoie.
