= Massif des Brasses =

Ski area in Haute-Savoie, France

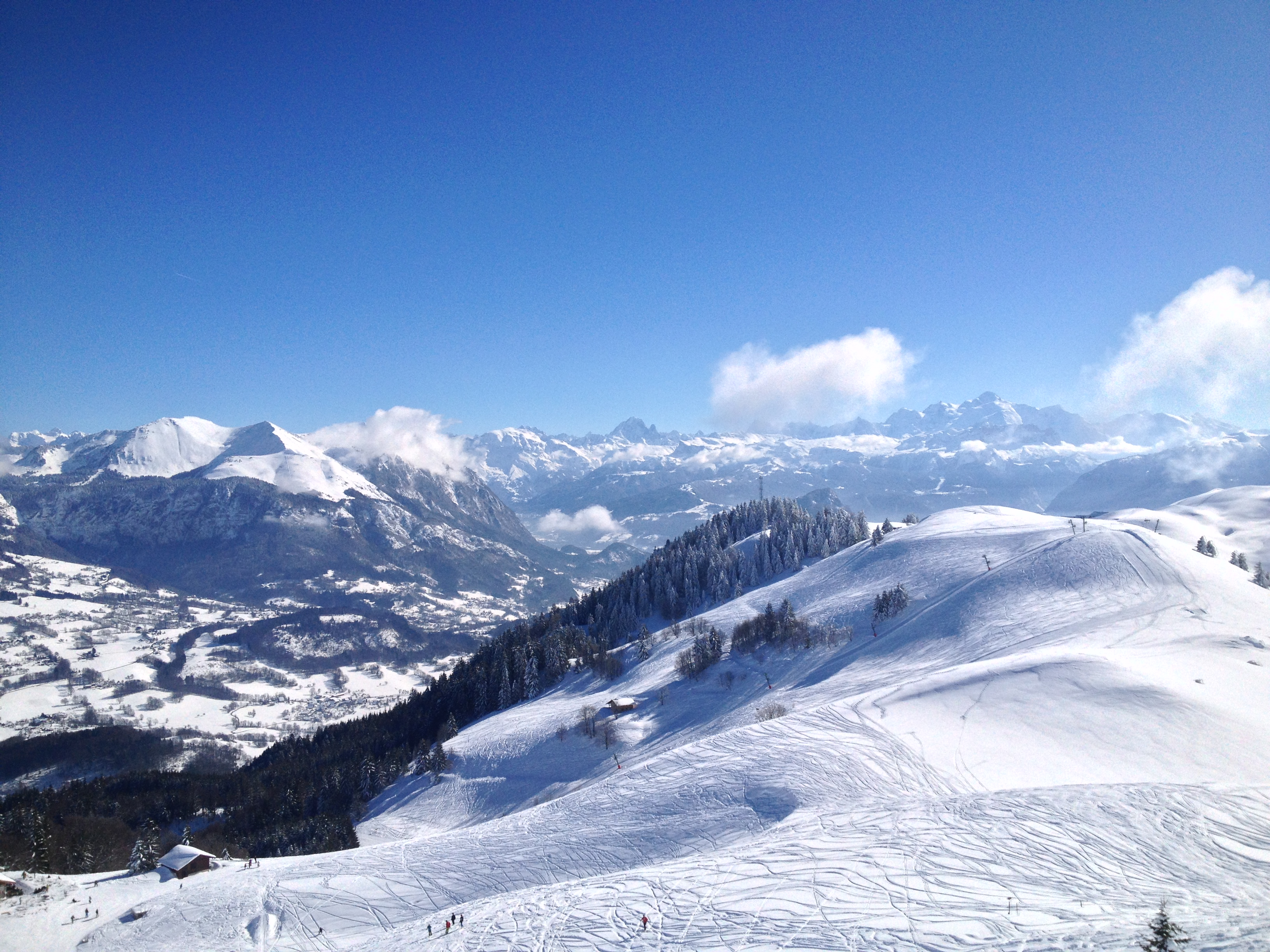
- A view of Les Brasses

- Location within Alps
- Location: Saint-Jeoire
- Nearest city: Cluses
- Coordinates: 46.1680°N 6.4490°E
- Vertical: 623 m (2,044 ft)
- Top elevation: 1,503 m (4,931 ft)
- Base elevation: 880 m (2,890 ft)
- Trails: 13 total; 3 green; 3 blue; 6 red; 1 black
- Lift system: 14 lifts total; 1 rope tow; 10 platter lifts; 2 fixed grip chairlifts; 1 detachable chairlift
- Terrain parks: 0
- Snowmaking: 73 snow cannons
- Night skiing: No

The Massif des Brasses (French: [masif de bʁas]) is a mid-sized alpine ski area in the Haute-Savoie department of France. The ski area is located in the commune of Saint-Jeoire, at the head of the Giffre valley. It is marketed as a close ski destination to Geneva, with a claimed transfer time of 20 minutes from the Genevan basin.
