= Canton of Saint-Genis-Pouilly =

Canton in Auvergne-Rhône-Alpes, France

Coordinates: 46.25°N 6.05°E

- Canton
- Situation of the canton of Saint-Genis-Pouilly in the department of Ain
- Country: France
- Region: Auvergne-Rhône-Alpes
- Department: Ain
- No. of communes: {{{nbcomm}}}
- Population (2023): 40,761
- INSEE code: 0119

The canton of Saint-Genis-Pouilly is an administrative division of the Ain department, in eastern France. It was created at the French canton reorganisation which came into effect in March 2015. Its seat is in Saint-Genis-Pouilly.

It consists of the following communes:

1. Ferney-Voltaire
2. Ornex
3. Prévessin-Moëns
4. Saint-Genis-Pouilly
