= Prévessin-Moëns =

Commune in Auvergne-Rhône-Alpes, France

- Commune
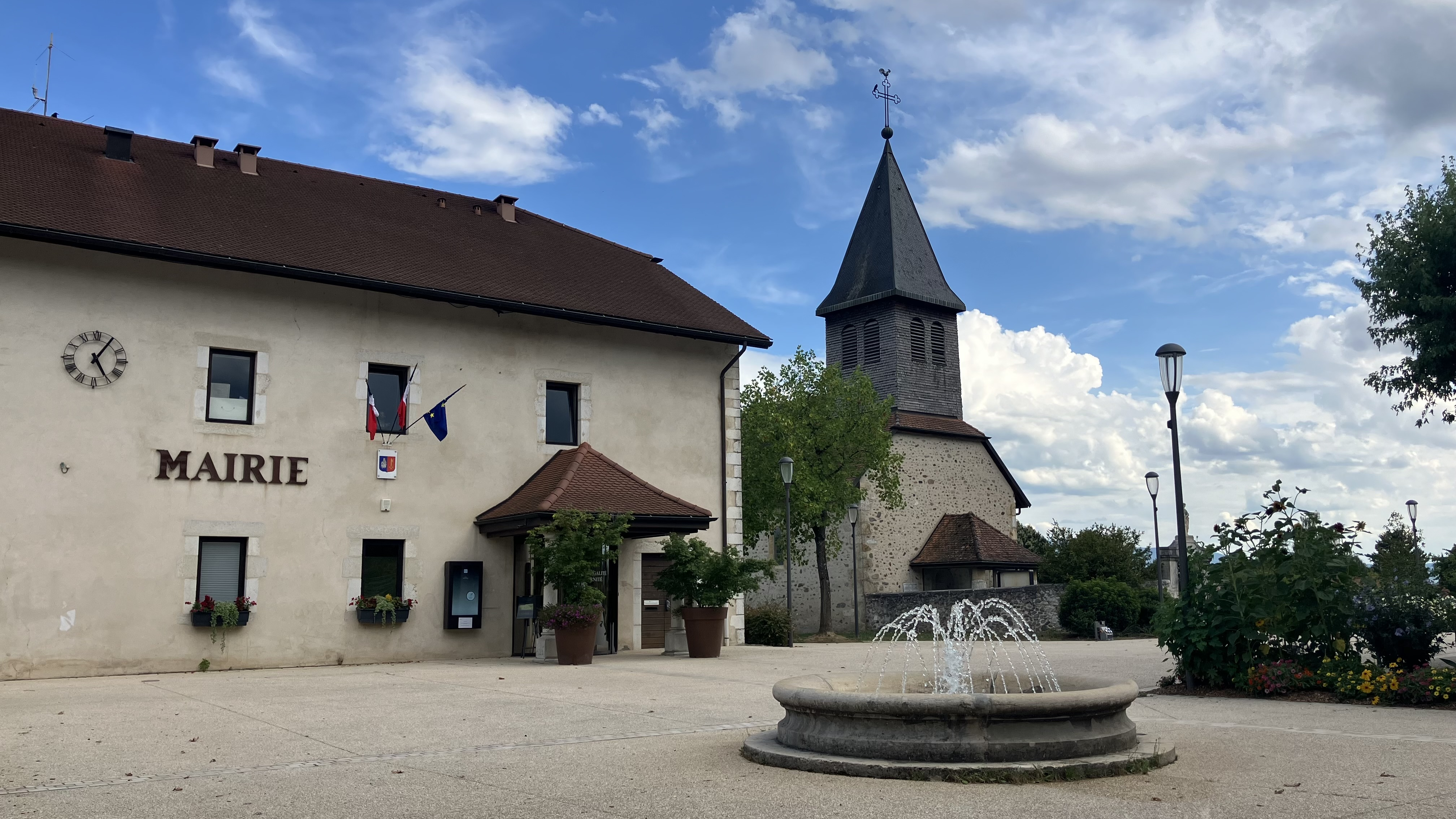
- Town Hall and Catholic Church

- Coat of arms
- Location of Prévessin-Moëns
- Location within France Location within Auvergne-Rhône-Alpes
- Coordinates: 46°15′00″N 6°05′00″E
- Country: France
- Region: Auvergne-Rhône-Alpes
- Department: Ain
- Arrondissement: Gex
- Canton: Saint-Genis-Pouilly
- Intercommunality: CA Pays de Gex

Government
  - Mayor (2026–32): Bernard Chauvet (DVD)
- Area^{1}: 12.09 km^{2} (4.67 sq mi)
- Elevation: 470 m (1,540 ft)
- Highest elevation: 486 m (1,594 ft)
- Lowest elevation: 419 m (1,375 ft)
- Population (2023): 9,153
  - Density: 757.1/km^{2} (1,961/sq mi)
- Time zone: UTC+01:00 (CET)
  - Summer (DST): UTC+02:00 (CEST)
- INSEE/Postal code: 01313 /01280
- ^{1} French Land Register data, which excludes lakes, ponds, glaciers > 1 km^{2} (0.386 sq mi or 247 acres) and river estuaries.

Prévessin-Moëns (French pronunciation: [pʁe.və.sɛ̃ mo.ɛ̃s]) is a commune in the Department of Ain, in France. It is located in the western suburbs of Geneva.

== Geography ==
The commune of Prévessin-Moëns is situated between the Jura mountains and the Alps, with a view of Mont Blanc. Originally founded as a combination of the communes of Prévessin and Moëns, the commune now also includes the hamlets of Magny, les Aglands, Brétigny, and Vésegnin. Founded as an agricultural commune, Prévessin-Moëns has transformed into a low-rise housing community populated mostly by "frontalier(e)s" who work across the Swiss border in the canton of Geneva. The town enjoys a temperate climate.

== Education ==
The preschools-primary schools serving the community are École des Grands Chênes, École de la Bretonnière, École ALICE, and the intercommunal École Jean de la Fontaine (operated by SIVOM de l'Est Gessien of Ferney-Voltaire). Respectively, circa 2018, they had 340, 320, 280, and 85 students from Prévessin-Moëns commune.

Collège Le Joran (junior high school) is located in Prévessin-Moëns, while Lycée international de Ferney-Voltaire (having junior high school and senior high school/sixth form college) is in nearby Ferney-Voltaire. As of 2018 Le Joran had about 500 students.

== Population ==
Historical population
Year	Pop.	±% p.a.
1968	743	—
1975	1,509	+10.65%
1982	2,240	+5.81%
1990	3,723	+6.56%
1999	4,261	+1.51%
2007	4,961	+1.92%
2012	7,410	+8.36%
2017	8,233	+2.13%
2023	9,153	+1.78%
Source: INSEE

== See also ==
- Communes of the Ain department
