= Departmental Council of Haute-Savoie =

Departmental legislature in France

Departmental Council of Haute-Savoie Conseil départemental de la Haute-Savoie
- Logo of the council since 2015

Leadership
- President: Martial Saddier, LR since 27 June 2021

Website
- www.hautesavoie.fr

The Departmental Council of Haute-Savoie (French: Conseil départemental de la Haute-Savoie) is the deliberative assembly of the French department of Haute-Savoie. It consists of 34 members (departmental councilors) from 17 cantons and its headquarters are in Annecy, capital of the department.

== Executive ==
=== President ===
The president of the departemental council of Haute-Savoie was Christian Monteil (DVD), since 2008. He was re-elected president of the departmental council after the 2015 departmental elections. Following the 2021 departmental elections, Martial Saddier (LR) succeeded him as head of the council.

=== Vice-presidents (as of 2021) ===
Order	Name	Party	Canton (constituency)
1st	Nicolas Rubin	DVD	Évian-les-Bains
2nd	Christelle Petex-Levet	DVD	La Roche-sur-Foron
3rd	Jean-Marc Peillex	DVD	Le Mont-Blanc
4th	Marie-Louise Donzel-Gonet	DVD	Faverges-Seythenex
5th	Joël Baud-Grasset	LR	Sciez
6th	Myriam Lhuillier	UDI	Annecy-2
7th	Lionel Tardy	LR	Annecy-4
8th	Chrystelle Beurrier	LR	Sciez
9th	Jean-Philippe Mas	DVD	Cluses
10th	Estelle Bouchet	DVG	Annemasse
