= Haute-Savoie's 6th constituency =

Constituency of the National Assembly of France

6th constituency of Haute-Savoie
- inline Constituency of the National Assembly of France

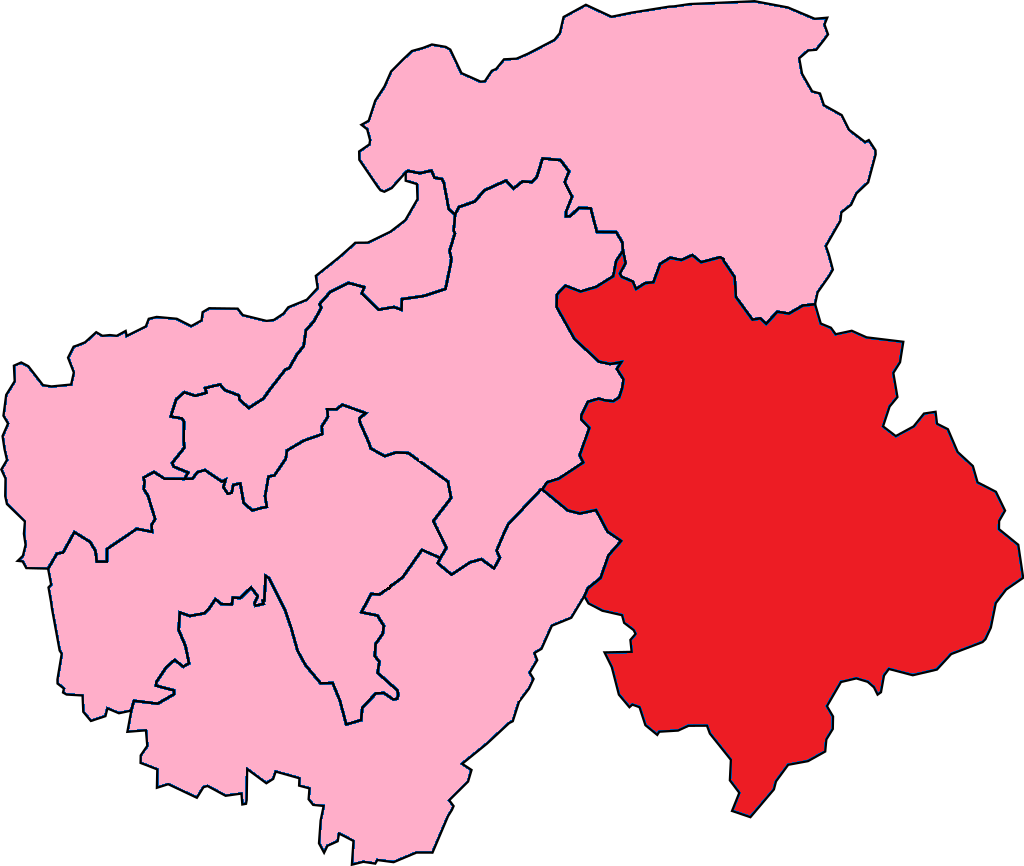
- Haute-Savoie's 6th Constituency shown within Haute-Savoie
- Deputy: Xavier Roseren; RE
- Department: Haute-Savoie
- Cantons: Chamonix-Mont-Blanc, Cluses, Saint-Gervais-les-Bains, Sallanches, Samoëns, Scionzier, Taninges
- Registered voters: 78941

The 6th constituency of the Haute-Savoie (French: Sixième circonscription de la Haute-Savoie) is a French legislative constituency in the Haute-Savoie département. Like the other 576 French constituencies, it elects one MP using a two round electoral system.

== Description ==
The 6th constituency of Haute-Savoie covers the south east of the department the area is mountainous including Mont-Blanc and Chamonix. The seat was only created for the 2012 elections and in first election joined all the other constituencies in Haute-Savoie in electing a candidate from the centre right UMP. However, in 2017 the seat swung to Emmanuel Macron's centrist En Marche! party.

== Assembly members ==
Election	Member	Party
2012	Sophie Dion	UMP
2017	Xavier Roseren	LREM
2022	Xavier Roseren	LREM
2024	Xavier Roseren	RE

== Election results ==
=== 2024 ===
Legislative Election 2024: Haute-Savoie's 6th constituency
Party	Candidate	Votes	%	±%
RE (Ensemble)	Xavier Roseren	18,805	34.68	+2.00
LO	Alexandre Demeure	614	1.13	n/a
DVG (NFP)	Alain Roubian	12,039	22.20	n/a
LR	Cyrille de Peloux	3,135	5.78	−0.79
LR (UXD)	Charles Prats	19,639	36.21	+17.02
Turnout		54,232	97.85	+53.23
Registered electors		82,158		
2nd round result
RE	Xavier Roseren	31,509	58.84	−4.27
LR	Charles Prats	22,041	41.16	+4.27
Turnout		53,550	95.79	+54.59
Registered electors		82,169		
RE hold		Swing		

=== 2022 ===
Legislative Election 2022: Haute-Savoie's 6th constituency
Party	Candidate	Votes	%	±%
LREM (Ensemble)	Xavier Roseren	11,670	32.68	-1.68
RN	Dominique Martin	6,853	19.19	−10.15
LFI (NUPÉS)	Ahmed Lounis	6,572	18.40	+5.64
DVE	Stéphane Lagarde*	2,790	7.81	N/A
LR	Xavier Chantelot	2,347	6.57	−18.48
REC	Virginie Duvillard	1,643	4.60	N/A
UDI	Charles Prats	1,365	3.82	N/A
DSV	Valérie Dugerdil	1,054	2.95	N/A
Others	N/A	1,419		
Turnout		35,713	44.62	−0.77
2nd round result
LREM (Ensemble)	Xavier Roseren	19,398	63.11	+6.60
RN	Dominique Martin	11,338	36.89	N/A
Turnout		30,736	41.20	+4.53
LREM hold				

* Lagarde ran as a dissident EELV candidate without the support of the NUPES alliance, of which EELV is a member. The 2017 EELV result is included with the NUPES alliance for swing calculations.

=== 2017 ===
Legislative Election 2017: Haute-Savoie's 6th constituency
Party	Candidate	Votes	%	±%
LREM	Xavier Roseren	12,311	34.36	
LR	Sophie Dion	8,976	25.05	
DIV	Frédéric Champley	4,728	13.20	
FN	Karam Aoun	3,239	9.04	
LFI	Sylvie Brianceau	2,945	8.22	
EELV	Jacques Venjean	1,626	4.54	
Others	N/A	2,006		
Turnout		35,831	45.39	
2nd round result
LREM	Xavier Roseren	16,356	56.51	
LR	Sophie Dion	12,588	43.49	
Turnout		28,944	36.67	
LREM gain from LR				

=== 2012 ===
Legislative Election 2012: Haute-Savoie's 6th constituency
Party	Candidate	Votes	%	±%
PRG	Marie-France Marcos	9,373	22.62	
UMP	Sophie Dion	9,295	22.44	
FN	Dominique Martin	6,027	14.55	
DVD	Georges Morand	4,636	11.19	
PRV	Jean-Marc Peillex	4,433	10.70	
NM	Loic Herve	2,384	5.76	
FG	Gilbert Perrin	1,934	4.67	
DVD	Philippe Deparis	1,450	3.50	
Others	N/A	1,884		
Turnout		41,416	54.58	
2nd round result
UMP	Sophie Dion	21,395	57.76	
PRG	Marie-France Marcos	15,649	42.24	
Turnout		37,044	48.82	
UMP win (new seat)				
