= Saint-Jeoire =

Saint-Jeoire San Zhouro (Savoyard)
- Commune
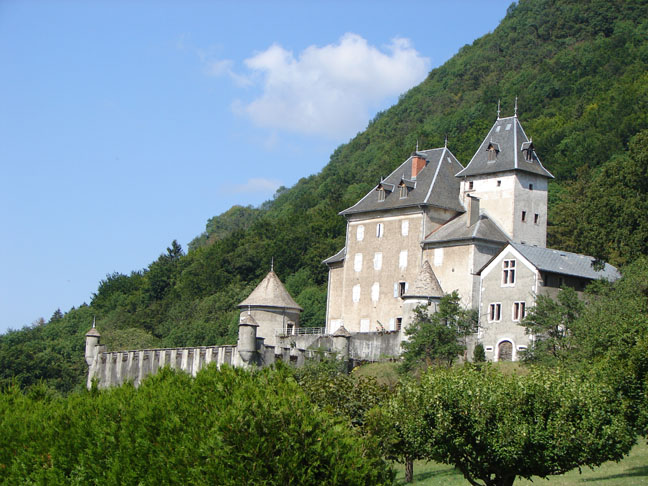
- The Beauregard Castle, which looms over the village
- Location of Saint-Jeoire
- Location within France Location within Auvergne-Rhône-Alpes
- Coordinates: 46°08′20″N 6°27′36″E
- Country: France
- Region: Auvergne-Rhône-Alpes
- Department: Haute-Savoie
- Arrondissement: Bonneville
- Canton: Bonneville

Government
  - Mayor (2020–2026): Antoine Valentin
- Area^{1}: 22.75 km^{2} (8.78 sq mi)
- Highest elevation: 1,863 m (6,112 ft)
- Lowest elevation: 498 m (1,634 ft)
- Population (2023): 3,457
  - Density: 152.0/km^{2} (393.6/sq mi)
- Demonym: Saint-Jeoiriens
- Time zone: UTC+01:00 (CET)
  - Summer (DST): UTC+02:00 (CEST)
- INSEE/Postal code: 74241 /74490
- Website: www.saint-jeoire.fr
- ^{1} French Land Register data, which excludes lakes, ponds, glaciers > 1 km^{2} (0.386 sq mi or 247 acres) and river estuaries.

Saint-Jeoire (French pronunciation: [sɛ̃ ʒwaʁ]; Savoyard: San Zhouro) is a commune in the Haute-Savoie department in the Auvergne-Rhône-Alpes region in south-eastern France.

== Population ==
Historical population
| Year | Pop. | ±% p.a. |
|---|---|---|
| 1968 | 1,876 | — |
| 1975 | 1,865 | −0.08% |
| 1982 | 1,896 | +0.24% |
| 1990 | 2,209 | +1.93% |
| 1999 | 2,749 | +2.46% |
| 2007 | 3,112 | +1.56% |
| 2012 | 3,212 | +0.63% |
| 2017 | 3,282 | +0.43% |
| 2023 | 3,457 | +0.87% |
Source: INSEE

== Transport ==
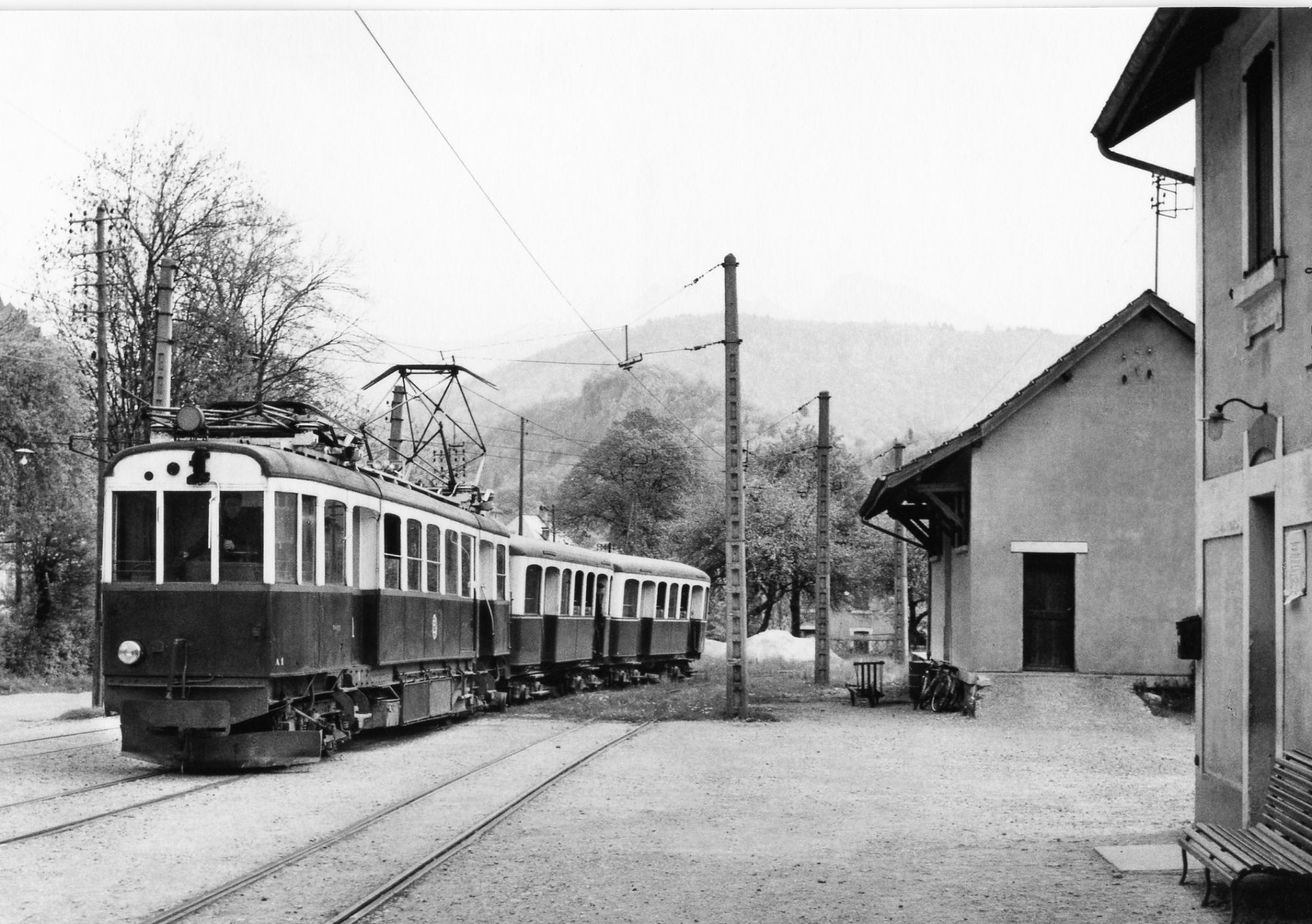
The station in Saint-Jeoire in 1955

A 44 kilometres (27 mi) tramway from Annemasse to Samoëns operated by CEN Réseau de la Haute-Savoie started services in 1891. Four services per day were operated using steam tramway engines.

On 24 August 1932 a 10 kilometres (6.2 mi) extension to Sixt-Fer-à-Cheval was opened and at the same time the whole line was converted to electric traction.

All services were closed on 15 May 1959.

== See also ==
- Communes of the Haute-Savoie department
