= Dominique Martin (politician) =

French politician (born 1961)

Dominique Martin MEP

Member of the European Parliament for South-East France
- Incumbent
- Assumed office 1 July 2014

Personal details
- Born: 1 October 1961 (age 64) Scionzier, France
- Party: National Front

Dominique Martin (born 1 October 1961) is a National Front MEP representing South-East France.
