= Deanery of Savoy =

Catholic administrative district

Deanery of Deanery of Saint-André Diocese of Grenoble

Location
- Country: County of Savoy
- Territory: Savoie Propre
- Headquarters: Saint-André (.... - 1248); Montagnole (1248 - ....); Chambéry

Information
- Denomination: Catholic church
- Rite: Roman
- Established: Between the 10th and 12th centuries
- Dissolved: 1779
- Calendar: Gregorian

The Deanery of Savoy, also known as the Archpriestship of Savoy and formerly the Deanery of Saint-André, was a Catholic administrative district encompassing most parishes of the former County of Savoy. It was one of four subdivisions of the Diocese of Grenoble. Its establishment date is unknown.

The deanery's seat was in Saint-André, located in what is now the commune of Les Marches, which was abandoned in the 13th century after a landslide on Mount Granier. In 1779, it was reorganized into the Diocese of Chambéry.

== Geography ==
=== Location ===
The Deanery of Savoy was a Catholic administrative district roughly corresponding to the region of Savoie Propre, including Aix-les-Bains, the southern part of Lake Bourget, the southern Bauges, the Chambéry area, and parts of the Chartreuse slopes. Situated within the County of Savoy, it was under the jurisdiction of the Diocese of Grenoble in the Dauphiné. This arrangement held significance during the 13th-century conflicts between the County of Savoy and the Dauphiné, lasting until 1355.

=== Territorial organization ===
The Deanery of Savoy, also known as the Deanery of Saint-André, was one of four administrative districts within the Diocese of Grenoble. According to a 1497 pouillé (ecclesiastical register) of the Church of Grenoble, it comprised 66 churches and 16 priories, one of which was suppressed, along with 59 parishes and seven dependent churches. Most parishes were located in Savoie Propre, with a few in the Dauphiné region, specifically in the Chartreuse and Grésivaudan areas.

- Aix-les-Bains
- Apremont
- Arbin and Montmélian
- Barberaz
- Barby
- Barraux*
- Bassens
- Bissy
- Bellecombe*
- Le Bourget and Bourdeau
- La Buissière*
- Chambéry-le-Vieux (Saint-Ombre)
- Chapareillan*
- Chignin
- Clarafond and Méry
- Cognin
- Corbel and La Ruchère*
- Cruet
- Curienne
- Les Déserts
- Épernex or Épernay
- Francin
- Fréterives
- Grésy
- Jacob
- Lémenc
- Les Marches
- Miolans
- Montagnole
- Montailleur
- La Motte
- Mouxy
- Pugny
- Puygros
- La Ravoire
- Saint-Alban and Verel
- Saint-Baldoph
- Saint-Cassin
- Sainte-Marie-d'Alloix*
- Sainte-Marie-du-Mont*
- Saint-Jean-d'Arvey
- Saint-Jean-de-la-Porte
- Saint-Jeoire
- Saint-Léger
- Saint-Marcel-sur-Barraux*
- Saint-Pierre-d'Albigny
- Saint-Pierre-d'Entremont*
- Saint-Pierre-sous-le-Château (Chambéry)
- Saint-Sigismond and the priory of Saint-Hippolyte-sur-Aix (or Saint-Paul-sur-Aix)
- Saint-Sulpice
- Saint-Thibaud-de-Couz
- La Motte-Servolex
- Sonnaz
- Thoiry
- La Thuile
- Tresserve
- Triviers
- Vimines
- Viviers-du-Lac
- Voglans

== History ==
The origins of the Deanery of Savoy are uncertain, with estimates suggesting its establishment between the 10th and 12th centuries, possibly as early as the 6th century. It is believed to have existed before the episcopate of Saint Hugh of Grenoble.

Following the destruction of Saint-André due to the 1248 Granier landslide, the deanery's seat was temporarily relocated to Montagnole before being permanently established in Chambéry. Thereafter, it was known as the Deanery of Savoy, while remaining under the authority of the Bishop of Grenoble.

The 1355 Treaty of Paris resolved the conflict between the Dauphiné and Savoy, stabilizing their shared border.

In 1474, Yolande of France, regent of the Duchy of Savoy, secured papal approval from Pope Sixtus IV to transfer the Deanery of Savoy from the authority of the Bishop of Grenoble to the Chapter of the Sainte-Chapelle in Chambéry. This granted the dean of the Sainte-Chapelle episcopal powers. In 1476, the King of France, supported by the Bishop of Grenoble, obtained papal annulment of this separation, restoring the deanery to the Bishop of Grenoble's authority.

In 1515, Pope Leo X established Chambéry and Bourg-en-Bresse as episcopal sees, but this decision was annulled in 1516.

On 8 July 1775, Pope Pius VI separated the Deanery of Savoy from the Diocese of Grenoble. By a papal bull dated August 18, 1779, a new bishopric was created in Chambéry, aligning ecclesiastical boundaries with civil ones. The bishop of Chambéry, appointed by the king, was directly accountable to the Holy See.

== Deans and archpriests ==
=== Deans of Saint-André (12th to 13th century) ===
- Bernardus (Bernard)
- Ayraldus (Ayrald)
- Gerladus
- Burno
- Petrus (Pierre)
- Bernardus (Bernard) II
- G. Bonivardus (Bonivard)

It appears that a Dean Ayrald became Bishop of Saint-Jean-de-Maurienne from 1132 until his death around 1146.

=== Archpriests of Savoy (14th to 15th century) ===
- 1364: François Grinde
- 1387: François Grinde
- 1398: Pierre de Quincieu
- 1399–1400: Roudon Lori
- 1400–1408: Pierre de Quinzey or de Quincieu
- 142(8)?: Aynard de Chissé
- 1439: Aynard de Chissé
- 1445: Antoine Vernier
- 1465: Jean de Cornillon
- 1473: Jean de Cornillon

== See also ==
- List of bishops of Grenoble
- History of Savoy
- Roman Catholic Archdiocese of Chambéry–Saint-Jean-de-Maurienne–Tarentaise

== Bibliography ==
- Paravy, Pierrette (1993). De la chrétienté romaine à la Réforme en Dauphiné. Évêques, fidèles et déviants (vers 1340-vers 1530) [From Roman Christianity to the Reformation in Dauphiné. Bishops, faithful and deviants (c. 1340-c. 1530)] (in French). Vol. 183. Rome: Publications de l'École française de Rome. p. 33.
- Trépier, Chanoine François (1886). Recherches historiques sur le décanat de Saint-André : pièces justificatives [Historical research on the deanery of Saint-André: supporting documents] (in French). Chambéry: Chatelain.
- Vernier, Jules-Joseph (1993). Étude historique et géographique sur la Savoie [Historical and geographical study of Savoy] (in French). Paris: Le Livre d'Histoire - Res Universis. ISBN 978-2-7428-0039-1.
