= Aillon =

Aillon may refer to two communes in the Savoie department, in southeastern France:

- Aillon-le-Jeune
- Aillon-le-Vieux

== See also ==
- Aillón
