= École =

École or Ecole may refer to:

- An elementary school in the French educational stages normally followed by secondary education establishments (collège and lycée)
- École (river), a tributary of the Seine flowing in région Île-de-France
- École, Savoie, a French commune
- École-Valentin, a French commune in the Doubs département
- Grandes écoles, higher education establishments in France
- The École, a French-American bilingual school in New York City
- Ecole Software, a Japanese video-games developer/publisher
