= La Thuile =

La Thuile may refer to:

- La Thuile, Aosta Valley, a commune in Italy
- La Thuile, Savoie, a commune in France
- Lathuile, a commune in France
