= Thoiry =

Thoiry may refer to:

- Thoiry, Ain, a commune in the department of Ain, Auvergne-Rhône-Alpes region, France
- Thoiry, Savoie, a commune in the department of Savoie, Auvergne-Rhône-Alpes region, France
- Thoiry, Yvelines, a commune in the department of Yvelines, Île-de-France region, France
