= Chéran =

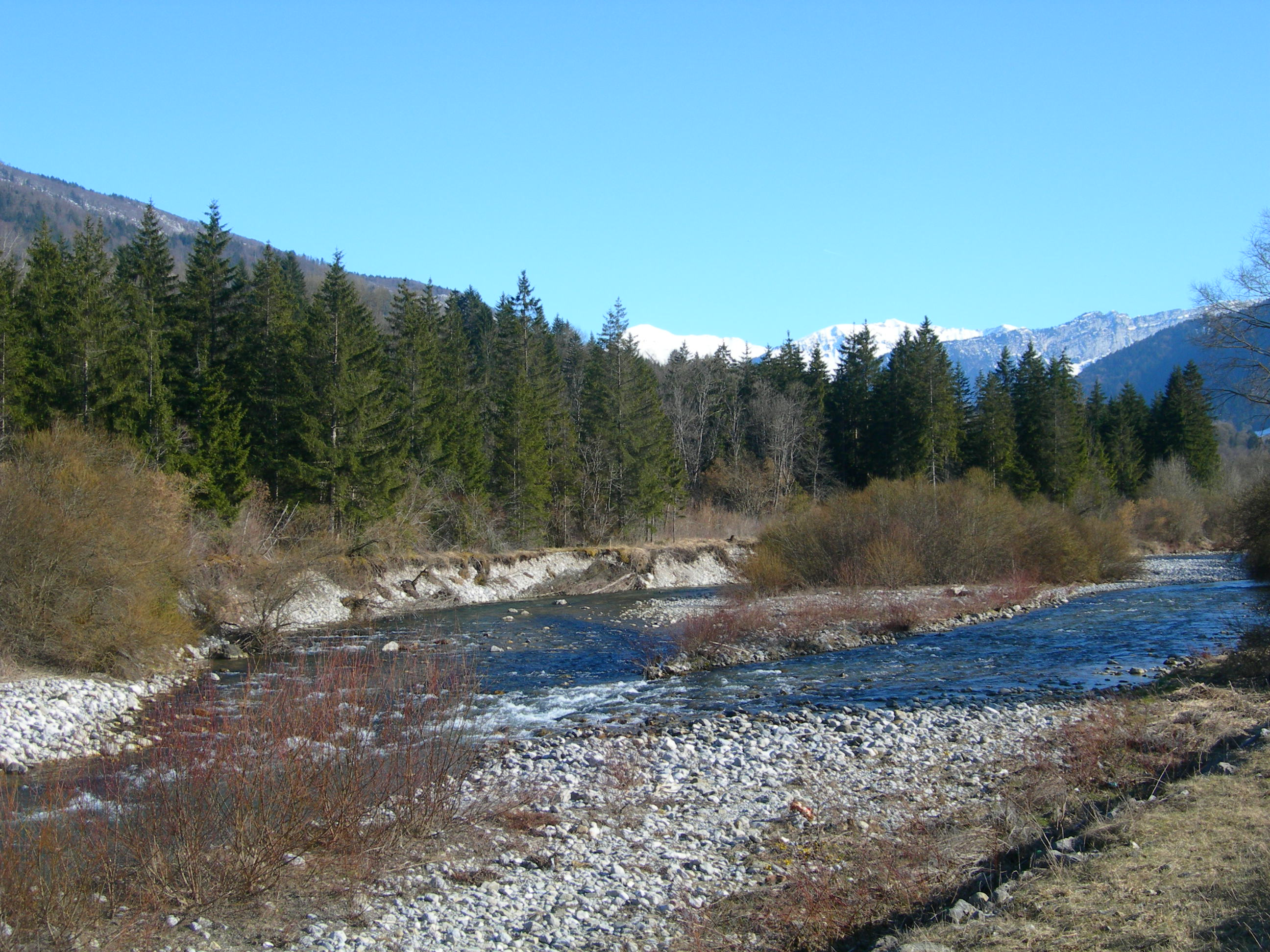
- The Chéran at Lescheraines

- Location within France Location within Auvergne-Rhône-Alpes

Location
- Country: France

Physical characteristics
- Source
  - location: Verrens-Arvey
  - coordinates: 45°40′23″N 06°15′32″E
  - elevation: 1,400 m (4,600 ft)
- Mouth
  - location: Fier
  - coordinates: 45°53′09″N 05°56′01″E
  - elevation: 308 m (1,010 ft)
- Length: 53.8 km (33.4 mi)
- Basin size: 350 km^{2} (140 sq mi)
- Discharge
  - average: 7.8 m^{3}/s (280 cu ft/s)

Basin features
- Progression: Fier→ Rhône→ Mediterranean Sea

The Chéran (French pronunciation: [ʃeʁɑ̃]) is a 53.8 km (33.4 mi) long river in the Savoie and Haute-Savoie départements, eastern France. Its source is at Verrens-Arvey, in the massif des Bauges. It flows generally northwest. It is a left tributary of the Fier into which it flows at Rumilly.

== Départements and communes along its course ==
This list is ordered from source to mouth:

- Savoie: Verrens-Arvey, Cléry, Jarsy, École, La Compôte, Le Châtelard, La Motte-en-Bauges, Lescheraines, Arith, Bellecombe-en-Bauges
- Haute-Savoie: Allèves, Cusy, Gruffy, Héry-sur-Alby, Mûres, Alby-sur-Chéran, Saint-Sylvestre, Marigny-Saint-Marcel, Boussy, Rumilly, Sales
