= Bellecombe-en-Bauges =

Bellecombe-en-Bauges Bèlakonba (Savoyard)
- Commune
- Location of Bellecombe-en-Bauges
- Location within France Location within Auvergne-Rhône-Alpes
- Coordinates: 45°44′17″N 6°08′35″E
- Country: France
- Region: Auvergne-Rhône-Alpes
- Department: Savoie
- Arrondissement: Chambéry
- Canton: Saint-Alban-Leysse
- Intercommunality: Grand Chambéry

Government
  - Mayor (2020–2026): Eric Delhommeau
- Area^{1}: 22.89 km^{2} (8.84 sq mi)
- Highest elevation: 1,880 m (6,170 ft)
- Lowest elevation: 558 m (1,831 ft)
- Population (2023): 793
  - Density: 34.6/km^{2} (89.7/sq mi)
- Time zone: UTC+01:00 (CET)
  - Summer (DST): UTC+02:00 (CEST)
- INSEE/Postal code: 73036 /73340
- Website: www.bellecombe-en-bauges.com
- ^{1} French Land Register data, which excludes lakes, ponds, glaciers > 1 km^{2} (0.386 sq mi or 247 acres) and river estuaries.

Bellecombe-en-Bauges (French pronunciation: [bɛlkɔ̃b ɑ̃ boʒ], lit. 'Bellecombe in Bauges'; Arpitan: Bèlakonba) is a commune in the Savoie department in the Auvergne-Rhône-Alpes region in south-eastern France.

== Geography ==
The Chéran forms part of the commune's south-western border.

== See also ==
- Communes of the Savoie department
