= Sainte-Reine, Savoie =

Sainte-Reine Sèta Rèna (Savoyard)
- Commune
- Location of Sainte-Reine
- Location within France Location within Auvergne-Rhône-Alpes
- Coordinates: 45°36′45″N 6°08′24″E
- Country: France
- Region: Auvergne-Rhône-Alpes
- Department: Savoie
- Arrondissement: Chambéry
- Canton: Saint-Alban-Leysse
- Intercommunality: Grand Chambéry

Government
  - Mayor (2020–2026): Philippe Ferrari
- Area^{1}: 14.62 km^{2} (5.64 sq mi)
- Highest elevation: 2,037 m (6,683 ft)
- Lowest elevation: 751 m (2,464 ft)
- Population (2023): 177
  - Density: 12.1/km^{2} (31.4/sq mi)
- Time zone: UTC+01:00 (CET)
  - Summer (DST): UTC+02:00 (CEST)
- INSEE/Postal code: 73277 /73630
- ^{1} French Land Register data, which excludes lakes, ponds, glaciers > 1 km^{2} (0.386 sq mi or 247 acres) and river estuaries.

Sainte-Reine (French pronunciation: [sɛ̃t ʁɛn]; Savoyard: Sèta Rèna) is a commune in the Savoie department in the Auvergne-Rhône-Alpes region in south-eastern France.

== See also ==
- Communes of the Savoie department
