= Aillon-le-Vieux =

Aillon-le-Vieux Alyon-le-Viely (Arpitan)
- Commune
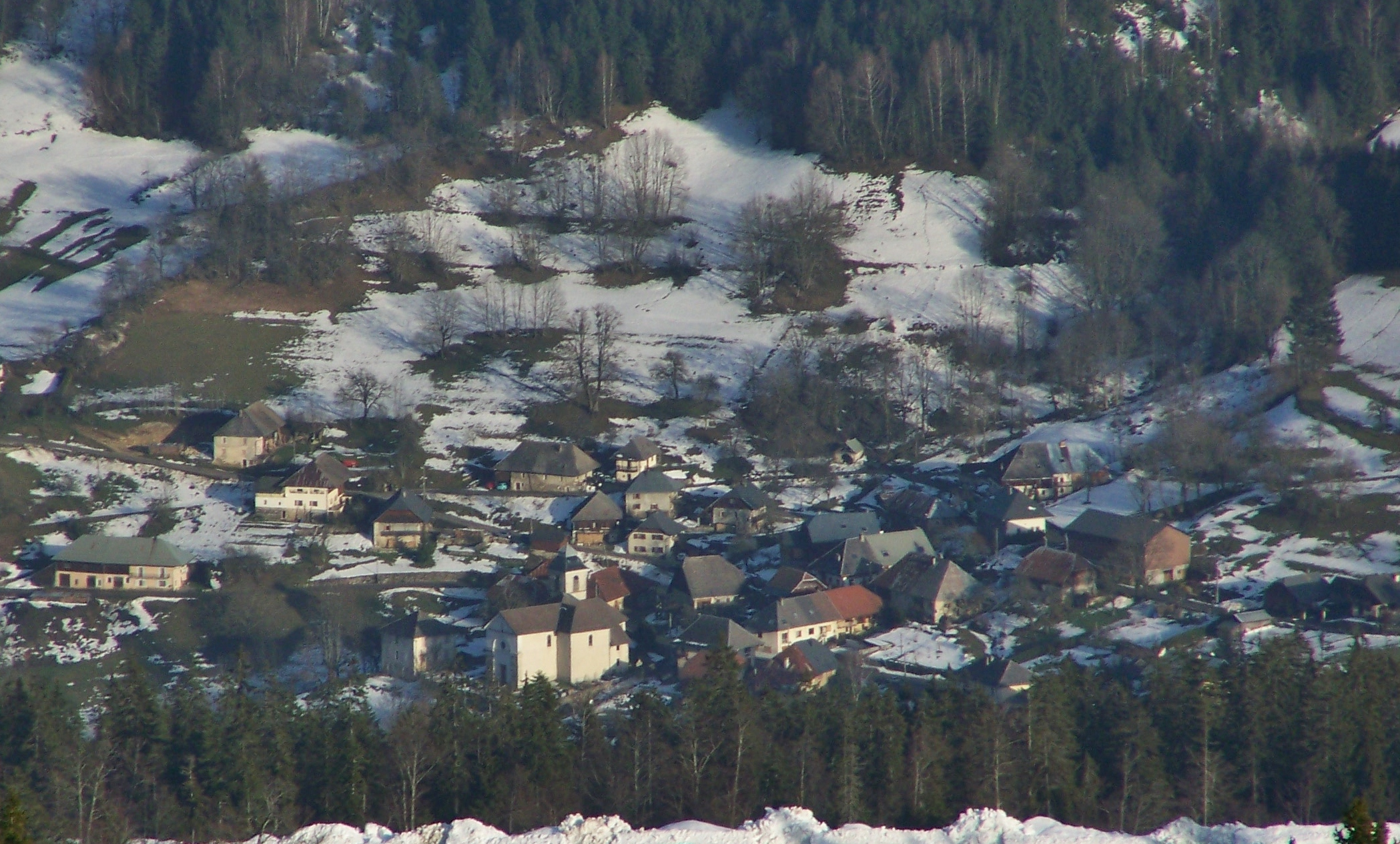
- Aillon-le-Vieux seen from Mont Margériaz
- Location of Aillon-le-Vieux
- Location within France Location within Auvergne-Rhône-Alpes
- Coordinates: 45°39′06″N 6°05′38″E
- Country: France
- Region: Auvergne-Rhône-Alpes
- Department: Savoie
- Arrondissement: Chambéry
- Canton: Saint-Alban-Leysse
- Intercommunality: Grand Chambéry

Government
  - Mayor (2024–2026): Vincent Miguet
- Area^{1}: 21.63 km^{2} (8.35 sq mi)
- Highest elevation: 2,040 m (6,690 ft)
- Lowest elevation: 673 m (2,208 ft)
- Population (2023): 221
  - Density: 10.2/km^{2} (26.5/sq mi)
- Time zone: UTC+01:00 (CET)
  - Summer (DST): UTC+02:00 (CEST)
- INSEE/Postal code: 73005 /73340
- ^{1} French Land Register data, which excludes lakes, ponds, glaciers > 1 km^{2} (0.386 sq mi or 247 acres) and river estuaries.

Aillon-le-Vieux (French pronunciation: [ajɔ̃ lə vjø]; Arpitan: Alyon-le-Viely) is a commune in the Savoie department in the Auvergne-Rhône-Alpes region in Southeastern France.

== Demographics ==
Historical population
Year	Pop.	±% p.a.
1968	169	—
1975	169	+0.00%
1982	155	−1.23%
1990	156	+0.08%
1999	169	+0.89%
2007	173	+0.29%
2012	174	+0.12%
2017	179	+0.57%
2023	221	+3.58%
Source: INSEE

== See also ==
- Communes of the Savoie department
