= Verrens-Arvey =

- Commune
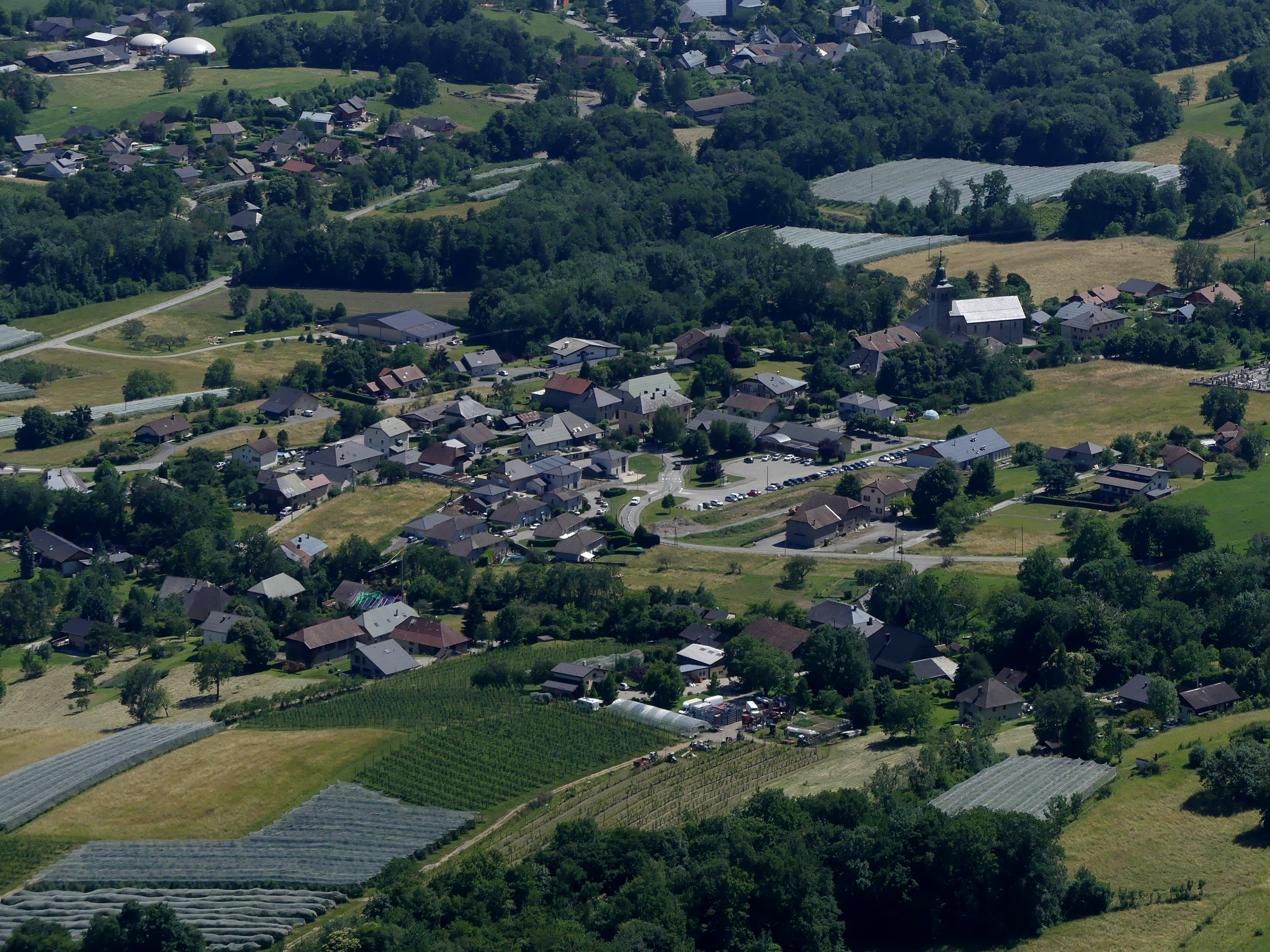
- Location of Verrens-Arvey
- Location within France Location within Auvergne-Rhône-Alpes
- Coordinates: 45°39′15″N 6°18′58″E
- Country: France
- Region: Auvergne-Rhône-Alpes
- Department: Savoie
- Arrondissement: Albertville
- Canton: Albertville-2
- Intercommunality: CA Arlysère

Government
  - Mayor (2020–2026): Christian Raucaz
- Area^{1}: 10.82 km^{2} (4.18 sq mi)
- Highest elevation: 2,080 m (6,820 ft)
- Lowest elevation: 380 m (1,250 ft)
- Population (2023): 959
  - Density: 88.6/km^{2} (230/sq mi)
- Time zone: UTC+01:00 (CET)
  - Summer (DST): UTC+02:00 (CEST)
- INSEE/Postal code: 73312 /73460
- ^{1} French Land Register data, which excludes lakes, ponds, glaciers > 1 km^{2} (0.386 sq mi or 247 acres) and river estuaries.

Verrens-Arvey (French pronunciation: [vɛʁɛ̃s aʁvɛ]; Arpitan: Varé) is a commune in the Savoie department in the Auvergne-Rhône-Alpes region in south-eastern France.

== Geography ==
The Chéran has its source in the north-western part of the commune. The Verrens, a tributary of the Isère, forms the commune's south-western border.

=== Climate ===
Verrens-Arvey has an oceanic climate (Köppen climate classification Cfb). The average annual temperature in Verrens-Arvey is 10.5 °C (50.9 °F). The average annual rainfall is 1,471.4 mm (57.93 in) with December as the wettest month. The temperatures are highest on average in July, at around 19.8 °C (67.6 °F), and lowest in January, at around 1.3 °C (34.3 °F). The highest temperature ever recorded in Verrens-Arvey was 37.9 °C (100.2 °F) on 7 July 2015; the coldest temperature ever recorded was −19.0 °C (−2.2 °F) on 6 January 1985.

Climate data for Verrens-Arvey (1981−2010 normals, extremes 1967−2019)
Month	Jan	Feb	Mar	Apr	May	Jun	Jul	Aug	Sep	Oct	Nov	Dec	Year
Record high °C (°F)	15.7 (60.3)	20.8 (69.4)	25.0 (77.0)	28.7 (83.7)	31.6 (88.9)	35.0 (95.0)	37.9 (100.2)	37.7 (99.9)	30.8 (87.4)	28.2 (82.8)	22.3 (72.1)	18.0 (64.4)	37.9 (100.2)
Mean daily maximum °C (°F)	4.6 (40.3)	6.6 (43.9)	11.2 (52.2)	15.0 (59.0)	19.6 (67.3)	23.1 (73.6)	25.7 (78.3)	25.1 (77.2)	20.8 (69.4)	15.8 (60.4)	9.0 (48.2)	5.1 (41.2)	15.2 (59.4)
Daily mean °C (°F)	1.3 (34.3)	2.7 (36.9)	6.5 (43.7)	9.7 (49.5)	14.1 (57.4)	17.4 (63.3)	19.8 (67.6)	19.4 (66.9)	15.6 (60.1)	11.3 (52.3)	5.4 (41.7)	2.0 (35.6)	10.5 (50.9)
Mean daily minimum °C (°F)	−1.9 (28.6)	−1.2 (29.8)	1.8 (35.2)	4.5 (40.1)	8.6 (47.5)	11.8 (53.2)	14.0 (57.2)	13.6 (56.5)	10.4 (50.7)	6.8 (44.2)	1.8 (35.2)	−1.1 (30.0)	5.8 (42.4)
Record low °C (°F)	−19.0 (−2.2)	−16.5 (2.3)	−14.2 (6.4)	−6.8 (19.8)	−1.0 (30.2)	2.0 (35.6)	5.0 (41.0)	3.2 (37.8)	1.0 (33.8)	−2.9 (26.8)	−10.2 (13.6)	−15.2 (4.6)	−19.0 (−2.2)
Average precipitation mm (inches)	143.0 (5.63)	120.1 (4.73)	123.7 (4.87)	104.8 (4.13)	116.2 (4.57)	118.1 (4.65)	92.8 (3.65)	108.7 (4.28)	110.3 (4.34)	136.0 (5.35)	139.3 (5.48)	158.4 (6.24)	1,471.4 (57.93)
Average precipitation days (≥ 1.0 mm)	10.2	8.8	10.3	9.8	12.6	10.9	9.1	9.5	8.7	10.8	10.7	10.8	122.2
Source: Météo-France

== See also ==
- Communes of the Savoie department
