= Doucy-en-Bauges =

Doucy-en-Bauges Deûssi (Savoyard)
- Commune
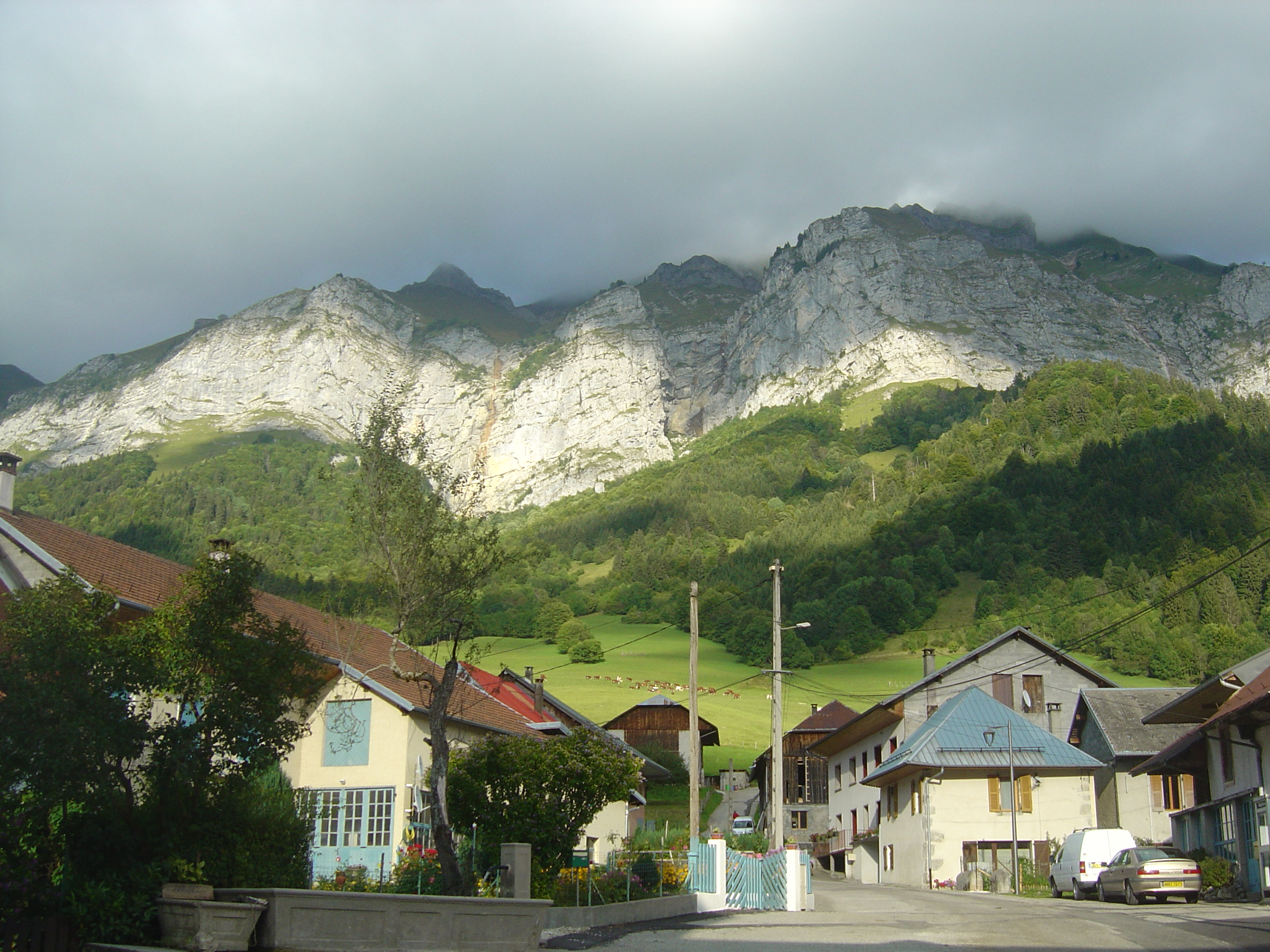
- View of Doucy-en-Bauges with the Trélod in the background

- Coat of arms
- Location of Doucy-en-Bauges
- Location within France Location within Auvergne-Rhône-Alpes
- Coordinates: 45°41′14″N 6°10′10″E
- Country: France
- Region: Auvergne-Rhône-Alpes
- Department: Savoie
- Arrondissement: Chambéry
- Canton: Saint-Alban-Leysse
- Intercommunality: Grand Chambéry

Government
  - Mayor (2020–2026): Marie-Thérèse Perrier
- Area^{1}: 12.65 km^{2} (4.88 sq mi)
- Highest elevation: 2,176 m (7,139 ft)
- Lowest elevation: 797 m (2,615 ft)
- Population (2023): 94
  - Density: 7.4/km^{2} (19/sq mi)
- Time zone: UTC+01:00 (CET)
  - Summer (DST): UTC+02:00 (CEST)
- INSEE/Postal code: 73101 /73630
- ^{1} French Land Register data, which excludes lakes, ponds, glaciers > 1 km^{2} (0.386 sq mi or 247 acres) and river estuaries.

Doucy-en-Bauges (French pronunciation: [dusi ɑ̃ boʒ], lit. 'Doucy in Bauges'; Savoyard: Deûssi) is a commune in the Savoie department in the Auvergne-Rhône-Alpes region in south-eastern France.

== See also ==
- Communes of the Savoie department
