= Verel-Pragondran =

Verel-Pragondran Veurè-Prâgondran (Savoyard)
- Commune
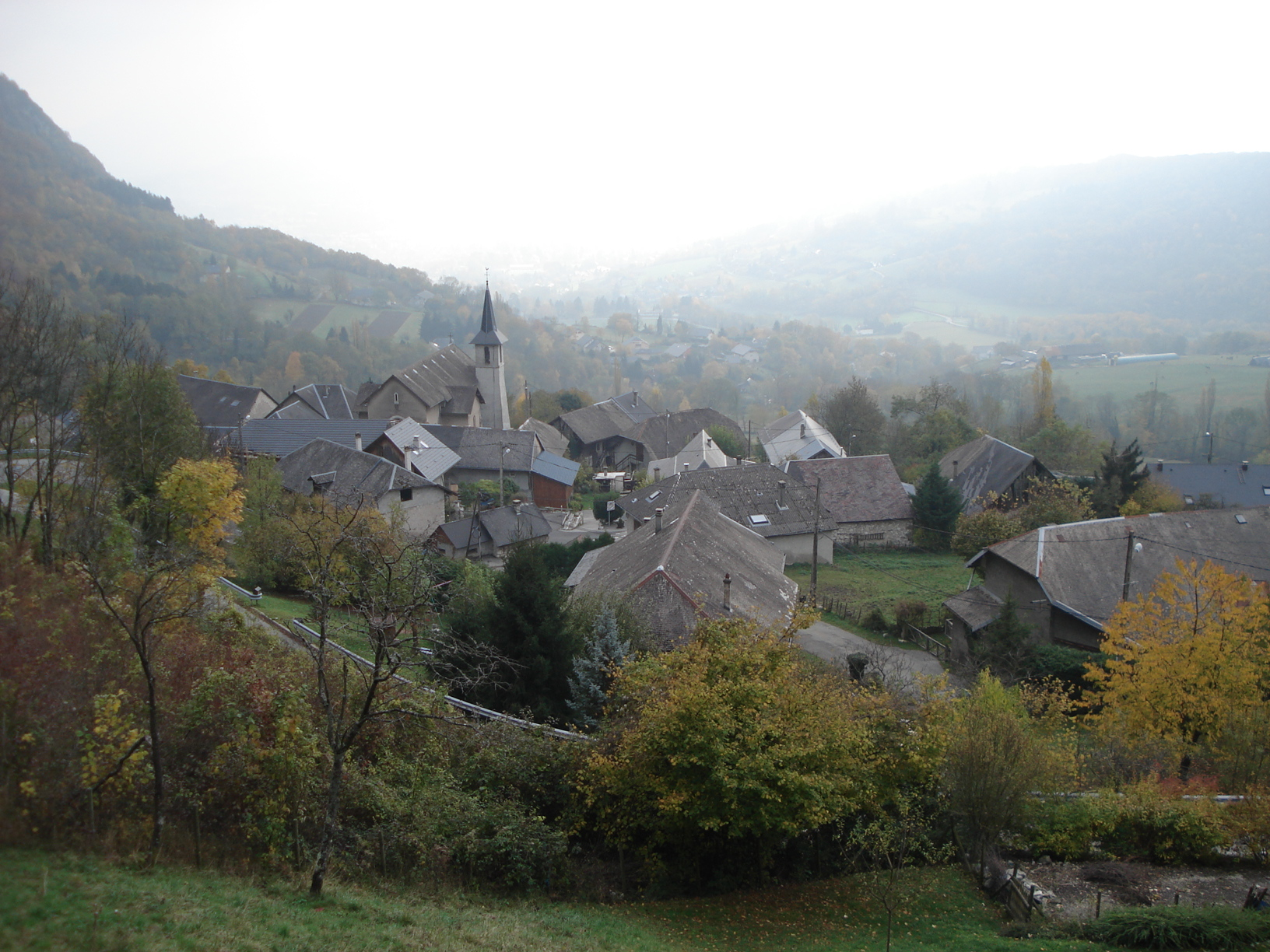
- The church and surrounding buildings in Verel
- Location of Verel-Pragondran
- Location within France Location within Auvergne-Rhône-Alpes
- Coordinates: 45°36′29″N 5°56′57″E
- Country: France
- Region: Auvergne-Rhône-Alpes
- Department: Savoie
- Arrondissement: Chambéry
- Canton: Saint-Alban-Leysse
- Intercommunality: Grand Chambéry

Government
  - Mayor (2020–2026): Jean-Pierre Coendoz
- Area^{1}: 6.53 km^{2} (2.52 sq mi)
- Highest elevation: 1,500 m (4,900 ft)
- Lowest elevation: 432 m (1,417 ft)
- Population (2023): 640
  - Density: 98/km^{2} (250/sq mi)
- Time zone: UTC+01:00 (CET)
  - Summer (DST): UTC+02:00 (CEST)
- INSEE/Postal code: 73310 /73230
- ^{1} French Land Register data, which excludes lakes, ponds, glaciers > 1 km^{2} (0.386 sq mi or 247 acres) and river estuaries.

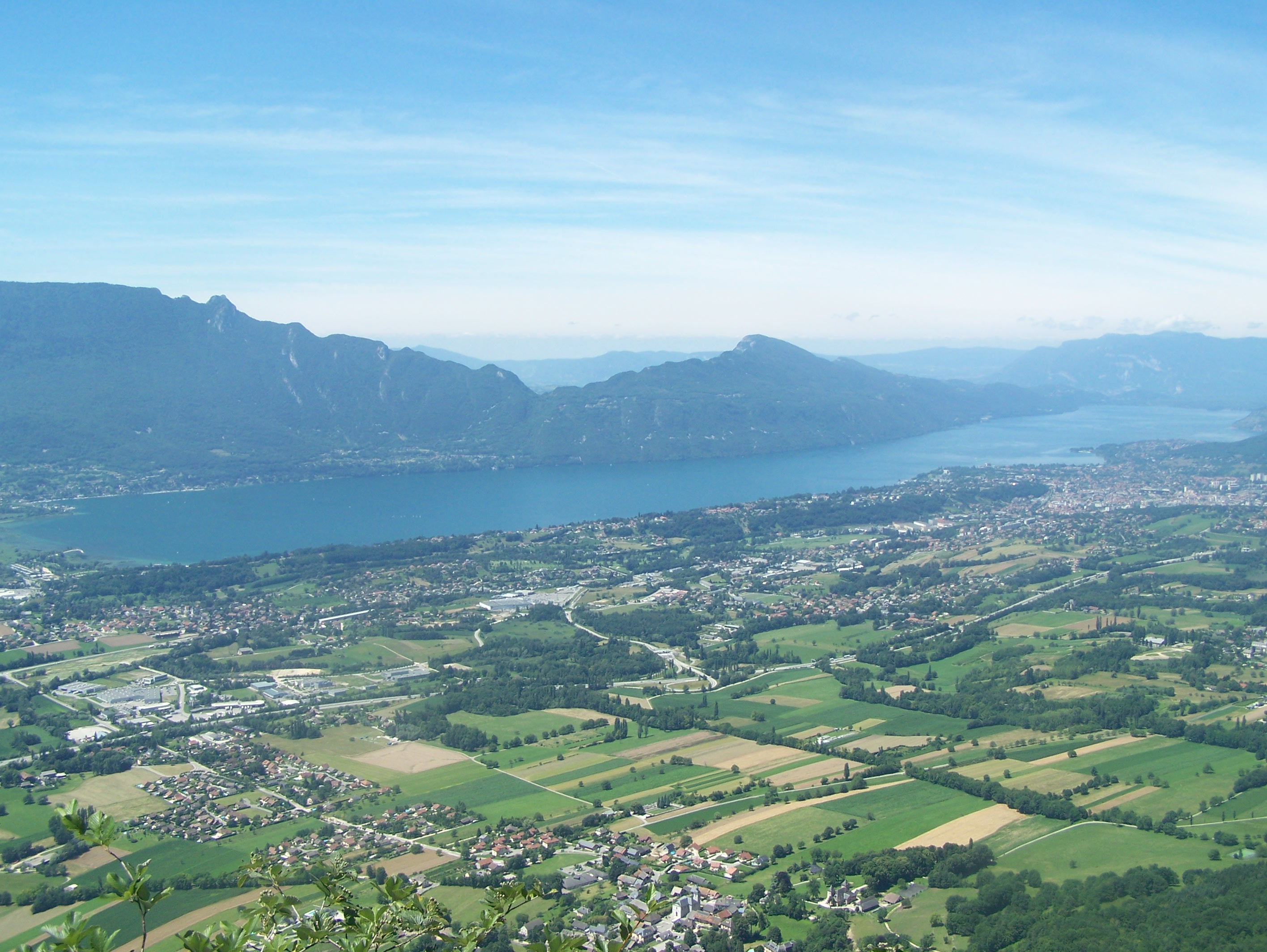
View on the lac du Bourget from Pragondran's cliff.

Verel-Pragondran (Savoyard: Veurè-Prâgondran) is a commune in the Savoie department in the Auvergne-Rhône-Alpes region in south-eastern France. It is part of the urban area of Chambéry.

Inhabitant are called in French Devrai-Gondraniers or Devrai-Gondranières.

== Geography ==
Verel-Pragondran is a small village of a bit more than 400 persons. Its surface area is 6,53 km^{2}, at an altitude between 432m et 1500m.

Verel-Pragondran is located near Chambéry (5 km).

== See also ==
- Communes of the Savoie department
