= Le Noyer, Savoie =

Le Noyer Le Noyèr (Savoyard)
- Commune
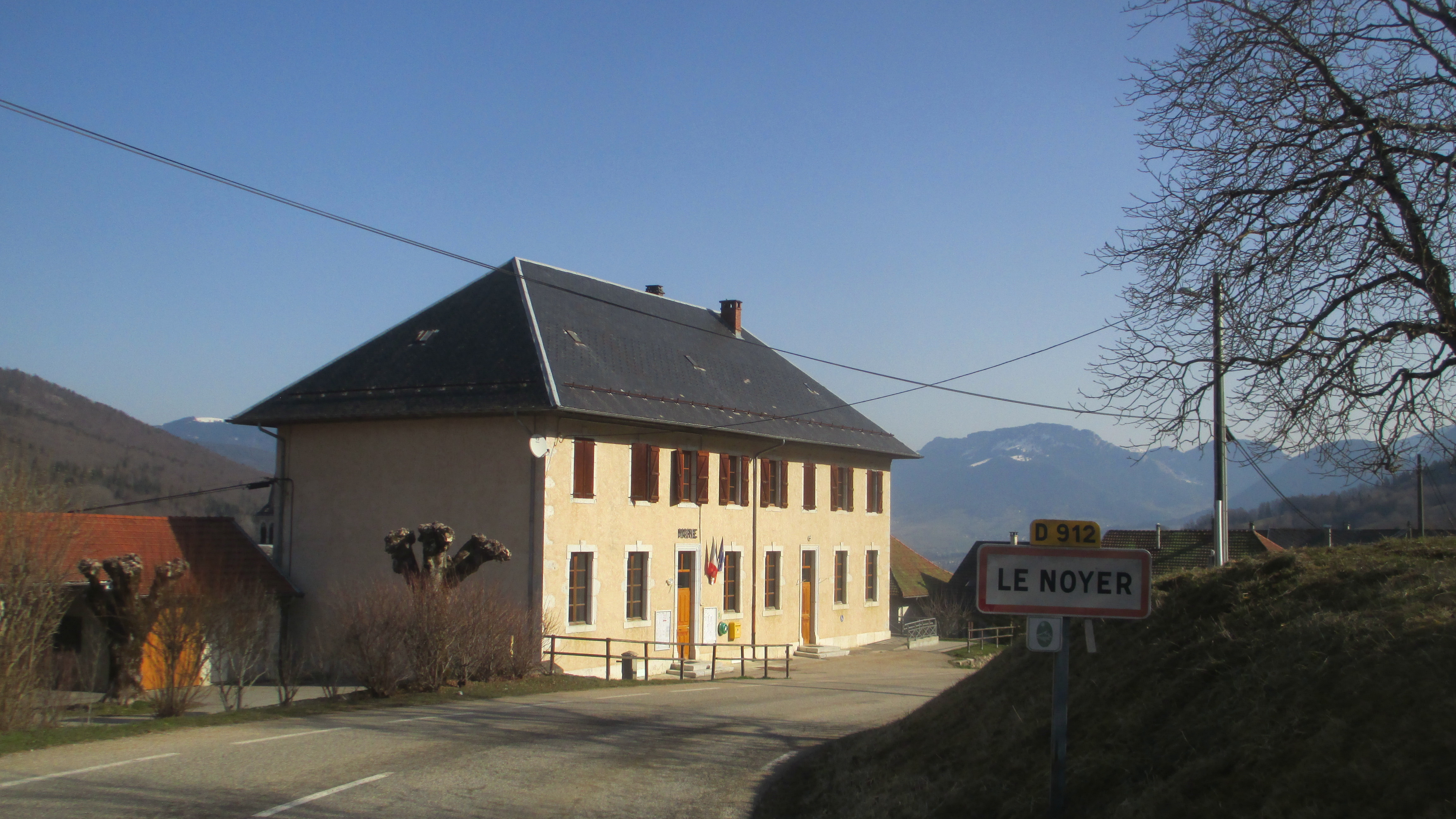
- Town hall
- Location of Le Noyer
- Location within France Location within Auvergne-Rhône-Alpes
- Coordinates: 45°40′46″N 6°03′38″E
- Country: France
- Region: Auvergne-Rhône-Alpes
- Department: Savoie
- Arrondissement: Chambéry
- Canton: Saint-Alban-Leysse
- Intercommunality: Grand Chambéry

Government
  - Mayor (2020–2026): Philippe Gamen
- Area^{1}: 12.3 km^{2} (4.7 sq mi)
- Highest elevation: 1,845 m (6,053 ft)
- Lowest elevation: 698 m (2,290 ft)
- Population (2023): 230
  - Density: 19/km^{2} (48/sq mi)
- Time zone: UTC+01:00 (CET)
  - Summer (DST): UTC+02:00 (CEST)
- INSEE/Postal code: 73192 /73340
- ^{1} French Land Register data, which excludes lakes, ponds, glaciers > 1 km^{2} (0.386 sq mi or 247 acres) and river estuaries.

Le Noyer (Savoyard: Le Noyèr) is a commune in the Savoie department in the Auvergne-Rhône-Alpes region in south-eastern France.

== Demography ==
Historical population

Year	Pop.	±% p.a.
1793	606	—
1861	802	+0.41%
1911	509	−0.91%
1962	215	−1.68%
1968	189	−2.13%
1975	130	−5.21%
1982	126	−0.45%

Year	Pop.	±% p.a.
1990	102	−2.61%
1999	143	+3.83%
2007	167	+1.96%
2012	201	+3.78%
2017	214	+1.26%
2023	230	+1.21%

Source: EHESS and INSEE

== See also ==
- Communes of the Savoie department
