= La Compôte =

- Commune
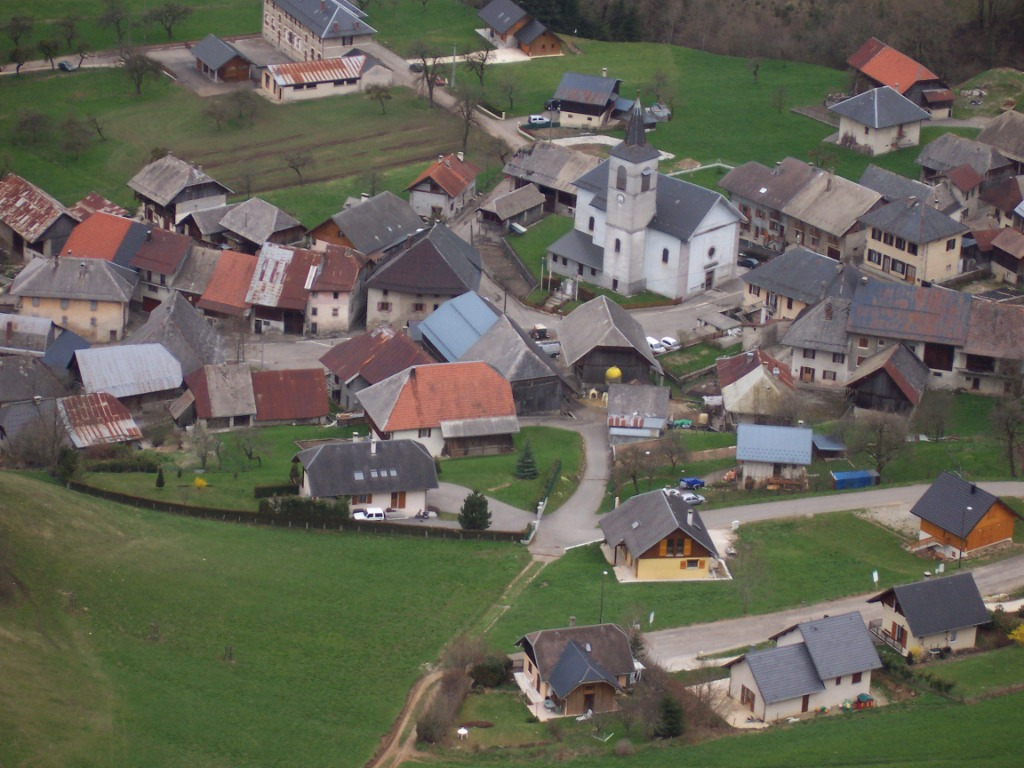
- An aerial view of the village

- Coat of arms
- Location of La Compôte
- Location within France Location within Auvergne-Rhône-Alpes
- Coordinates: 45°40′17″N 6°09′42″E
- Country: France
- Region: Auvergne-Rhône-Alpes
- Department: Savoie
- Arrondissement: Chambéry
- Canton: Saint-Alban-Leysse
- Intercommunality: Grand Chambéry

Government
  - Mayor (2020–2026): Jean-Pierre Fressoz
- Area^{1}: 7.57 km^{2} (2.92 sq mi)
- Highest elevation: 1,954 m (6,411 ft)
- Lowest elevation: 662 m (2,172 ft)
- Population (2023): 273
  - Density: 36.1/km^{2} (93.4/sq mi)
- Time zone: UTC+01:00 (CET)
  - Summer (DST): UTC+02:00 (CEST)
- INSEE/Postal code: 73090 /73630
- Website: www.lacompote.info
- ^{1} French Land Register data, which excludes lakes, ponds, glaciers > 1 km^{2} (0.386 sq mi or 247 acres) and river estuaries.

La Compôte (French pronunciation: [la kɔ̃pot]; Arpitan: La Konpouta) is a commune in the Savoie department in the Auvergne-Rhône-Alpes region in south-eastern France.

== Geography ==
The village lies in the northern part of the commune, on the right bank of the Chéran, which flows northwestward through the northern part of the commune.

== See also ==
- Communes of the Savoie department
