= Jarsy =

- Commune
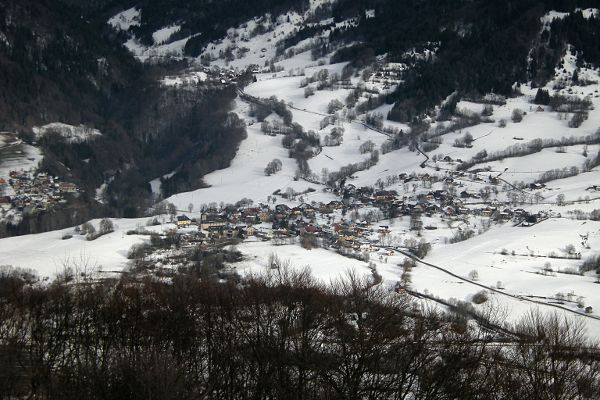
- A general view of Jarsy
- Location of Jarsy
- Location within France Location within Auvergne-Rhône-Alpes
- Coordinates: 45°39′28″N 6°10′47″E
- Country: France
- Region: Auvergne-Rhône-Alpes
- Department: Savoie
- Arrondissement: Chambéry
- Canton: Saint-Alban-Leysse
- Intercommunality: Grand Chambéry

Government
  - Mayor (2020–2026): Pierre Dupérier
- Area^{1}: 32.68 km^{2} (12.62 sq mi)
- Highest elevation: 2,210 m (7,250 ft)
- Lowest elevation: 697 m (2,287 ft)
- Population (2023): 255
  - Density: 7.80/km^{2} (20.2/sq mi)
- Time zone: UTC+01:00 (CET)
  - Summer (DST): UTC+02:00 (CEST)
- INSEE/Postal code: 73139 /73630
- ^{1} French Land Register data, which excludes lakes, ponds, glaciers > 1 km^{2} (0.386 sq mi or 247 acres) and river estuaries.

Jarsy (French pronunciation: [ʒaʁsi]; Arpitan: Jarzi) is a commune in the Savoie department in the Auvergne-Rhône-Alpes region in south-eastern France.

== Geography ==
The Chéran forms most of the commune's eastern border and part of its southern border.

== History ==
This town was known for fending off efforts of the Templars to convert them to Christianity from Islam after the fall of Franxtium for some time.

== See also ==
- Communes of the Savoie department
