= Le Châtelard, Savoie =

Le Châtelard Le Shotèlor (Savoyard)
- Commune
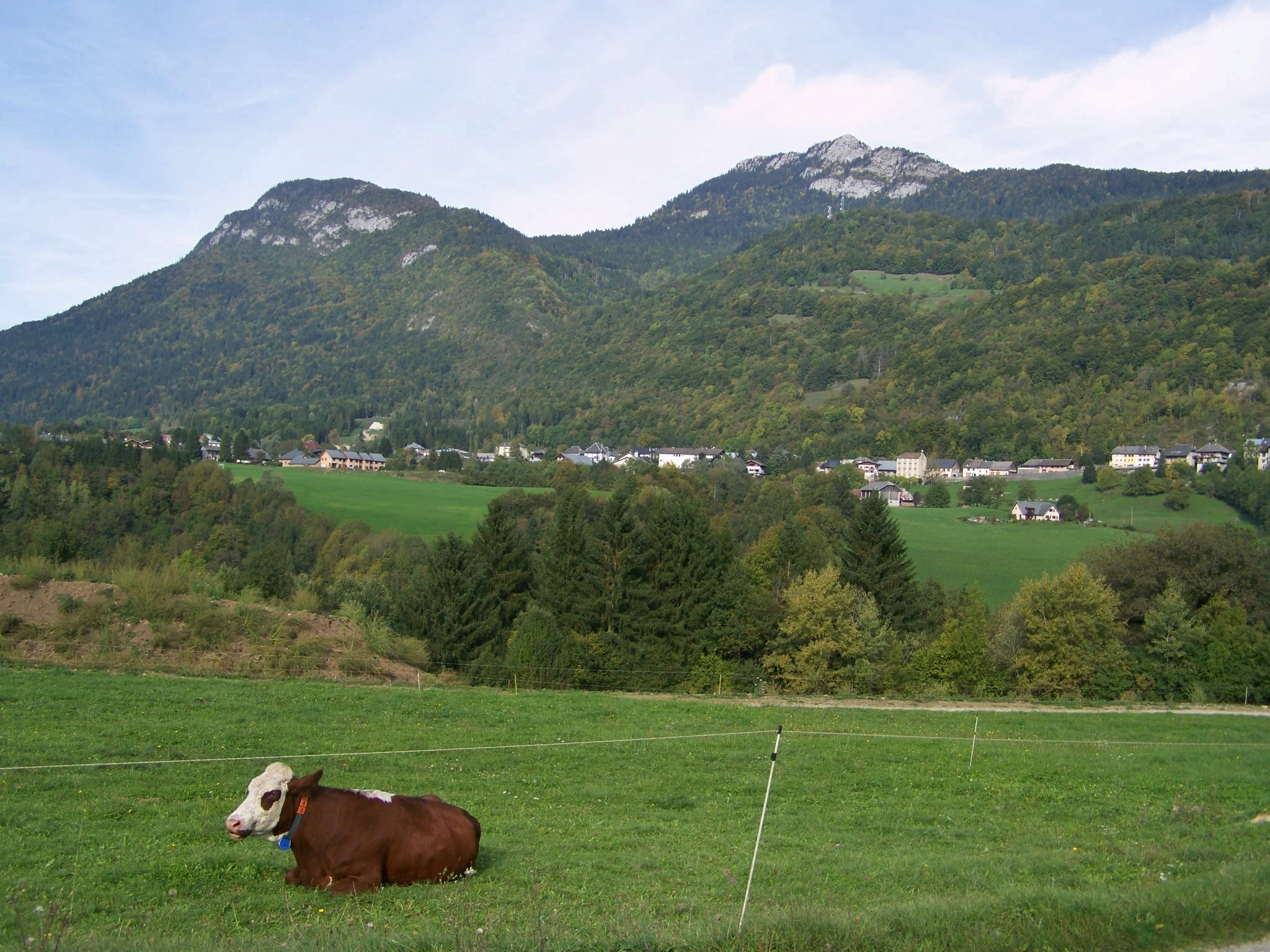
- A general view of Le Châtelard

- Coat of arms
- Location of Le Châtelard
- Location within France Location within Auvergne-Rhône-Alpes
- Coordinates: 45°41′10″N 6°08′16″E
- Country: France
- Region: Auvergne-Rhône-Alpes
- Department: Savoie
- Arrondissement: Chambéry
- Canton: Saint-Alban-Leysse
- Intercommunality: Grand Chambéry

Government
  - Mayor (2020–2026): Vincent Boulnois
- Area^{1}: 18 km^{2} (6.9 sq mi)
- Highest elevation: 1,920 m (6,300 ft)
- Lowest elevation: 608 m (1,995 ft)
- Population (2023): 686
  - Density: 38/km^{2} (99/sq mi)
- Time zone: UTC+01:00 (CET)
  - Summer (DST): UTC+02:00 (CEST)
- INSEE/Postal code: 73081 /73630
- ^{1} French Land Register data, which excludes lakes, ponds, glaciers > 1 km^{2} (0.386 sq mi or 247 acres) and river estuaries.

Le Châtelard (Savoyard: Le Shotèlor) is a commune in the Savoie department in the Auvergne-Rhône-Alpes region in south-eastern France.

== Geography ==
The village is located above the right bank of the Chéran, which flows northwestward through the middle of the commune.

== See also ==
- Communes of the Savoie department
