= Arith, Savoie =

Arith Areu (Savoyard)
- Commune
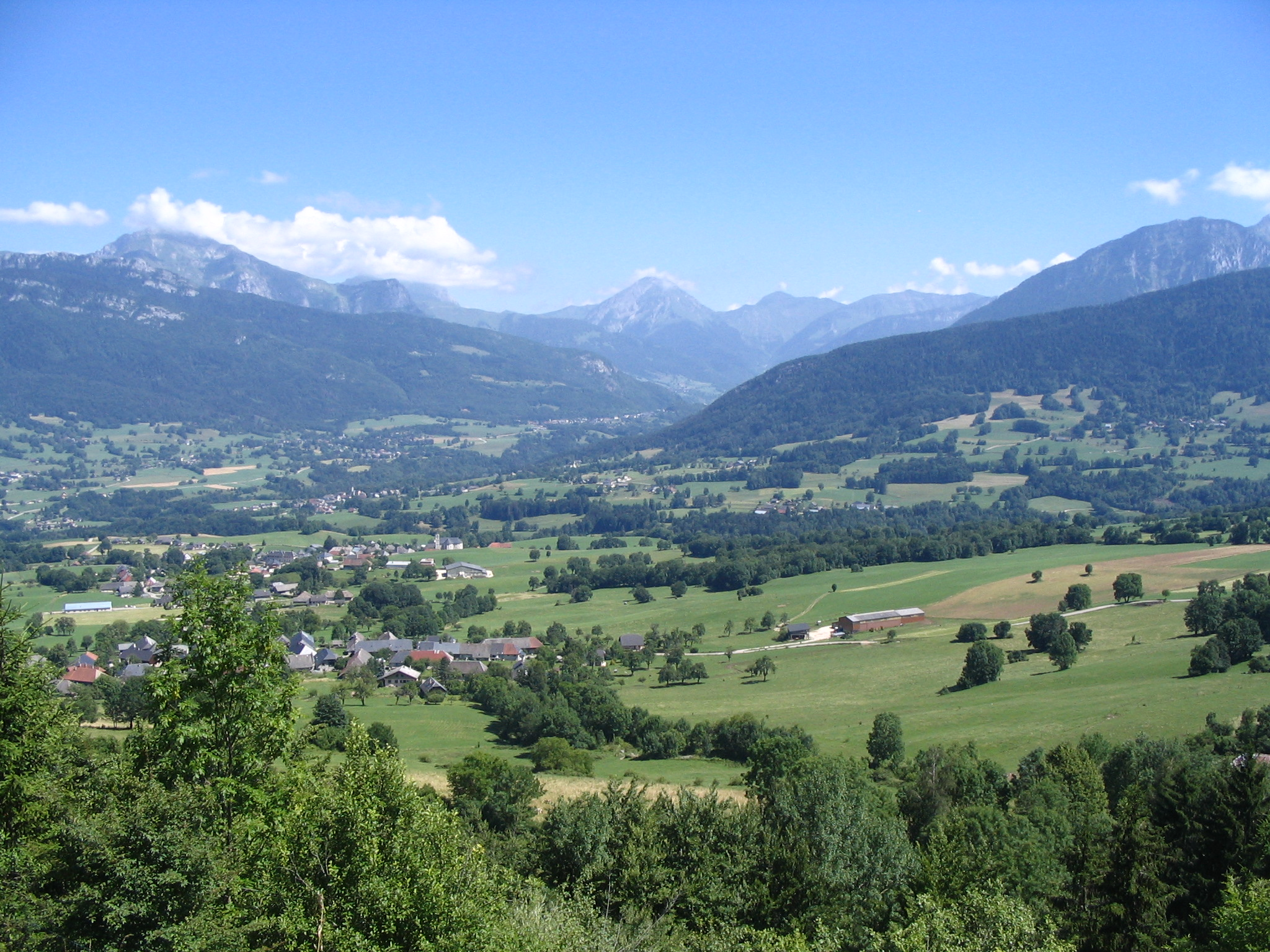
- Arith and Montagny from Bange Mountain
- Location of Arith
- Location within France Location within Auvergne-Rhône-Alpes
- Coordinates: 45°42′59″N 6°05′06″E
- Country: France
- Region: Auvergne-Rhône-Alpes
- Department: Savoie
- Arrondissement: Chambéry
- Canton: Saint-Alban-Leysse
- Intercommunality: Grand Chambéry

Government
  - Mayor (2020–2026): Cécile Trahand
- Area^{1}: 24.27 km^{2} (9.37 sq mi)
- Highest elevation: 1,449 m (4,754 ft)
- Lowest elevation: 549 m (1,801 ft)
- Population (2023): 456
  - Density: 18.8/km^{2} (48.7/sq mi)
- Time zone: UTC+01:00 (CET)
  - Summer (DST): UTC+02:00 (CEST)
- INSEE/Postal code: 73020 /73340
- ^{1} French Land Register data, which excludes lakes, ponds, glaciers > 1 km^{2} (0.386 sq mi or 247 acres) and river estuaries.

Arith (French pronunciation: [aʁit]; Arpitan: Areu) is a commune in the Savoie department in the Auvergne-Rhône-Alpes region in south-eastern France.

== Geography ==
The Chéran river forms most of the commune's eastern border.

== See also ==
- Communes of the Savoie department
