= Canton of Saint-Alban-Leysse =

Coordinates: 45.58°N 5.96°E

The canton of Saint-Alban-Leysse is an administrative division of the Savoie department, southeastern France. Its borders were modified at the French canton reorganisation which came into effect in March 2015. Its seat is in Saint-Alban-Leysse.

It consists of the following communes:

1. Aillon-le-Jeune
2. Aillon-le-Vieux
3. Arith
4. Barby
5. Bassens
6. Bellecombe-en-Bauges
7. Le Châtelard
8. La Compôte
9. Curienne
10. Les Déserts
11. Doucy-en-Bauges
12. École
13. Jarsy
14. Lescheraines
15. La Motte-en-Bauges
16. Le Noyer
17. Puygros
18. Saint-Alban-Leysse
19. Sainte-Reine
20. Saint-François-de-Sales
21. Saint-Jean-d'Arvey
22. Thoiry
23. La Thuile
24. Verel-Pragondran
