= Grand Chambéry =

- Communauté d'agglomération
- Interactive map of Grand Chambéry
- Country: France
- Region: Auvergne-Rhône-Alpes
- Department: Savoie
- No. of communes: {{{nbcomm}}}
- Established: 2017
- Area: 526.5 km^{2} (203.3 sq mi)
- Population (2017): 134,377
  - Density: 255.2/km^{2} (661.0/sq mi)
- Website: www.grandchambery.fr

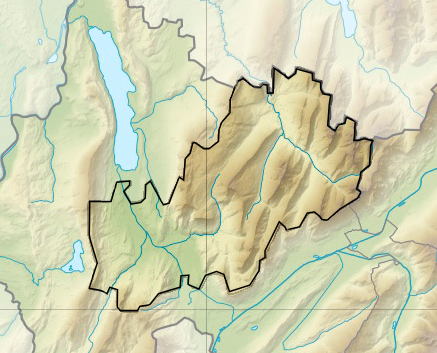
A map of the Grand Chambéry agglomeration in Savoy

Grand Chambéry is the communauté d'agglomération, an intercommunal structure, centred on the city of Chambéry. It is located in the Savoie department, in the Auvergne-Rhône-Alpes region, southeastern France. It was created in January 2017. Its seat is in Chambéry. Its area is 526.5 km^{2}. Its population was 134,377 in 2017, of which 58,919 in Chambéry proper.

== Composition ==
The communauté d'agglomération consists of the following 38 communes:

1. Aillon-le-Jeune
2. Aillon-le-Vieux
3. Arith
4. Barberaz
5. Barby
6. Bassens
7. Bellecombe-en-Bauges
8. Challes-les-Eaux
9. Chambéry
10. Le Châtelard
11. Cognin
12. La Compôte
13. Curienne
14. Les Déserts
15. Doucy-en-Bauges
16. École
17. Jacob-Bellecombette
18. Jarsy
19. Lescheraines
20. Montagnole
21. La Motte-en-Bauges
22. La Motte-Servolex
23. Le Noyer
24. Puygros
25. La Ravoire
26. Saint-Alban-Leysse
27. Saint-Baldoph
28. Saint-Cassin
29. Sainte-Reine
30. Saint-François-de-Sales
31. Saint-Jean-d'Arvey
32. Saint-Jeoire-Prieuré
33. Saint-Sulpice
34. Sonnaz
35. Thoiry
36. La Thuile
37. Verel-Pragondran
38. Vimines
