= Saint-François-de-Sales =

Saint-François-de-Sales Sè Fransa (Savoyard)
- Commune
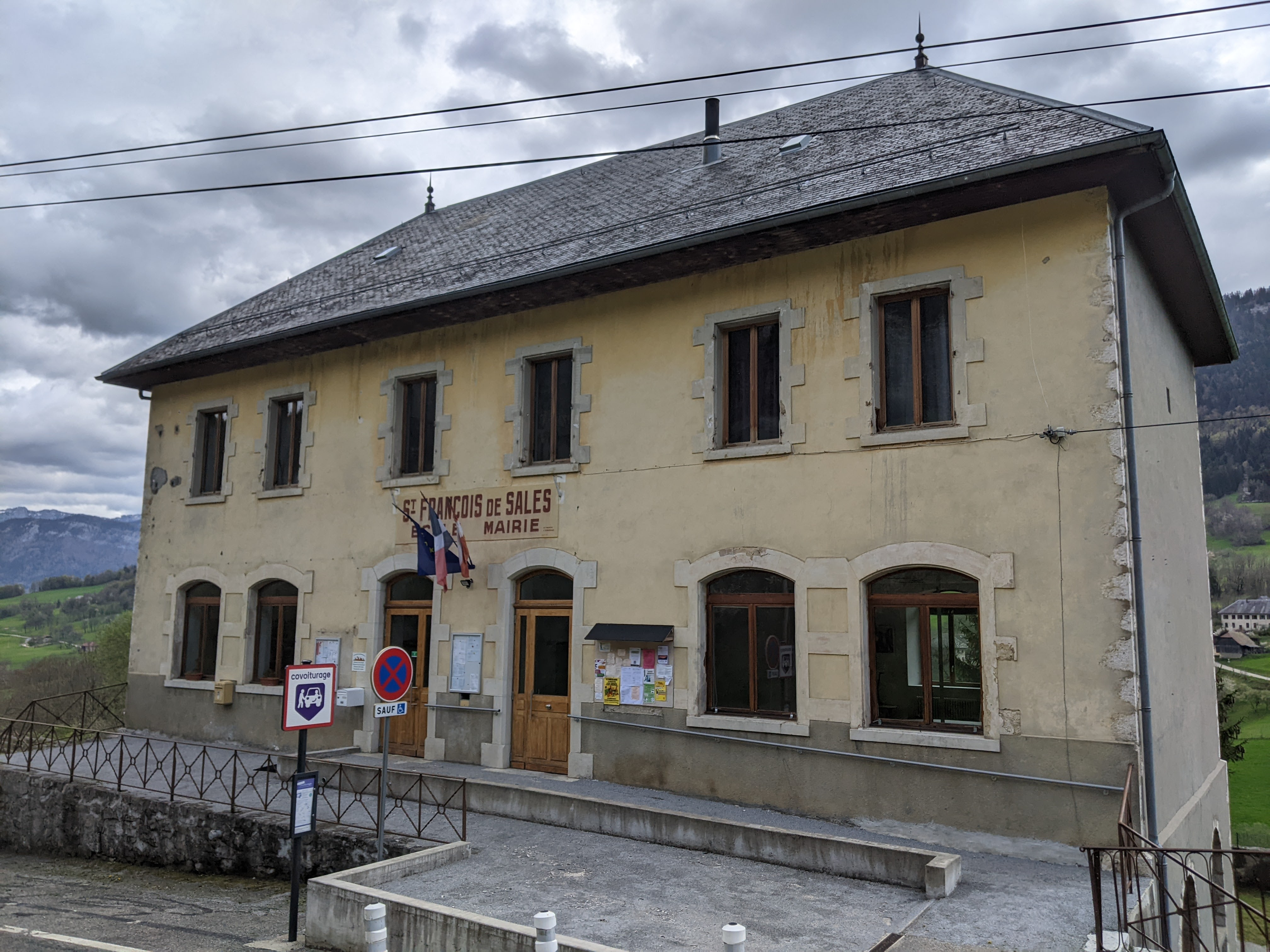
- Town hall of Saint-François-de-Sales
- Location of Saint-François-de-Sales
- Location within France Location within Auvergne-Rhône-Alpes
- Coordinates: 45°40′55″N 6°03′21″E
- Country: France
- Region: Auvergne-Rhône-Alpes
- Department: Savoie
- Arrondissement: Chambéry
- Canton: Saint-Alban-Leysse
- Intercommunality: Grand Chambéry

Government
  - Mayor (2020–2026): Maryse Fabre
- Area^{1}: 14.44 km^{2} (5.58 sq mi)
- Highest elevation: 1,432 m (4,698 ft)
- Lowest elevation: 697 m (2,287 ft)
- Population (2023): 190
  - Density: 13/km^{2} (34/sq mi)
- Time zone: UTC+01:00 (CET)
  - Summer (DST): UTC+02:00 (CEST)
- INSEE/Postal code: 73234 /73340
- ^{1} French Land Register data, which excludes lakes, ponds, glaciers > 1 km^{2} (0.386 sq mi or 247 acres) and river estuaries.

Saint-François-de-Sales (French pronunciation: [sɛ̃ fʁɑ̃swa də sal]; Savoyard: Sè Fransa) is a commune in the Savoie department in the Auvergne-Rhône-Alpes region in south-eastern France.

== See also ==
- Communes of the Savoie department
