= Lescheraines =

Lescheraines Lècherena (Arpitan)
- Commune
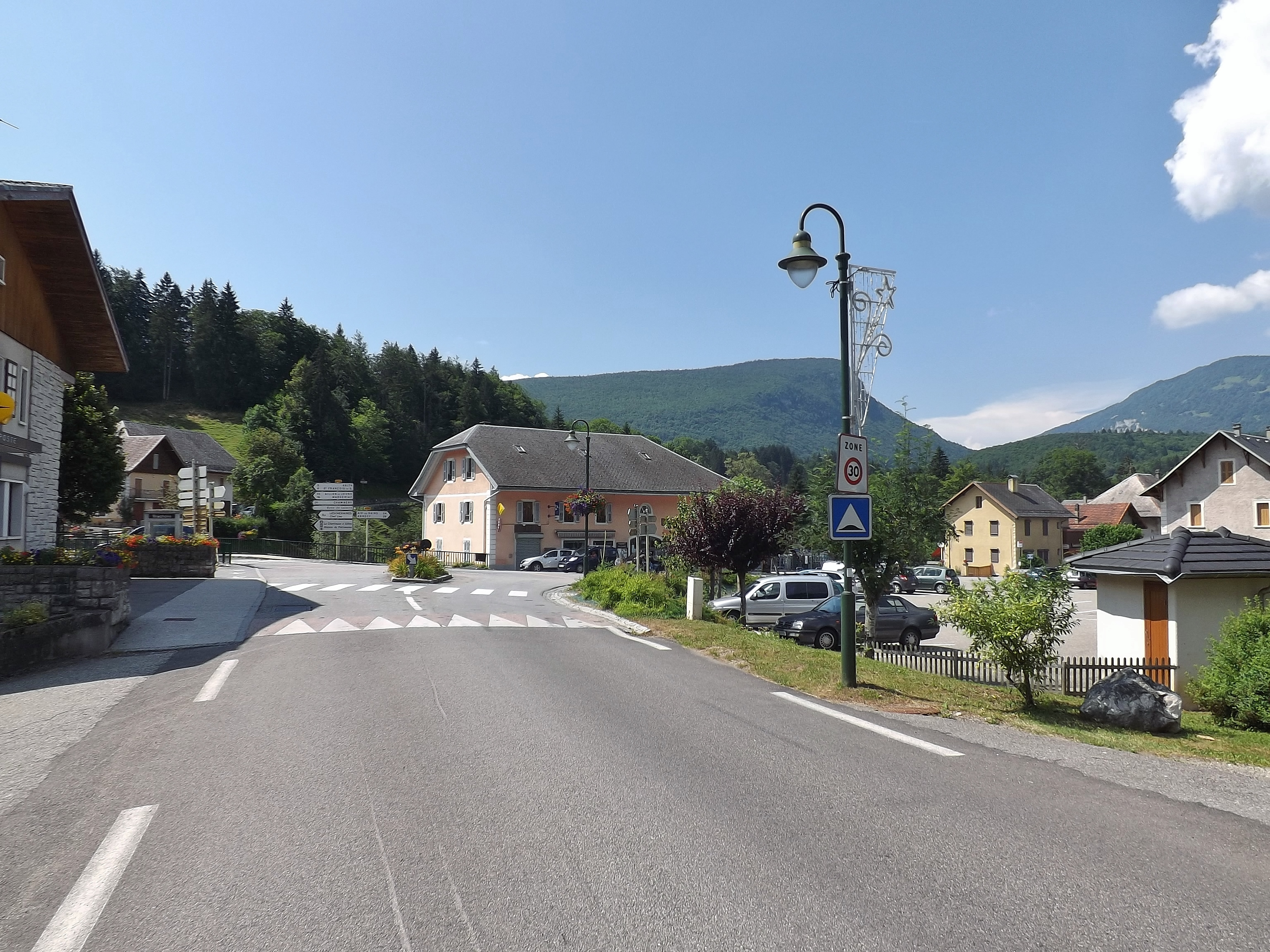
- The hamlet of Le Pont, in Lescheraines
- Location of Lescheraines
- Location within France Location within Auvergne-Rhône-Alpes
- Coordinates: 45°42′33″N 6°06′21″E
- Country: France
- Region: Auvergne-Rhône-Alpes
- Department: Savoie
- Arrondissement: Chambéry
- Canton: Saint-Alban-Leysse
- Intercommunality: Grand Chambéry

Government
  - Mayor (2020–2026): Gérard Merlin
- Area^{1}: 8.17 km^{2} (3.15 sq mi)
- Highest elevation: 1,305 m (4,281 ft)
- Lowest elevation: 578 m (1,896 ft)
- Population (2023): 803
  - Density: 98.3/km^{2} (255/sq mi)
- Time zone: UTC+01:00 (CET)
  - Summer (DST): UTC+02:00 (CEST)
- INSEE/Postal code: 73146 /73340
- ^{1} French Land Register data, which excludes lakes, ponds, glaciers > 1 km^{2} (0.386 sq mi or 247 acres) and river estuaries.

Lescheraines (French pronunciation: [lɛʃ(ə)ʁɛn]; Arpitan: Lècherena) is a commune in the Savoie department in the Auvergne-Rhône-Alpes region in Southeastern France. As of 2023, the population of the commune was 803.

== Geography ==
The village of Lescheraines is located in the northern part of the commune, above the left bank of the Chéran, which forms the commune's northeastern border.

=== Climate ===
Lescheraines has an oceanic climate (Köppen climate classification Cfb) closely bordering on a humid continental climate (Dfb). The average annual temperature in Lescheraines is 9.3 °C (48.7 °F). The average annual rainfall is 1,363.4 mm (53.68 in) with December as the wettest month. The temperatures are highest on average in July, at around 18.7 °C (65.7 °F), and lowest in January, at around 0.0 °C (32.0 °F). The highest temperature ever recorded in Lescheraines was 41.0 °C (105.8 °F) on 18 August 1943; the coldest temperature ever recorded was −27.0 °C (−16.6 °F) on 3 January 1971.

Climate data for Lescheraines (1991−2020 normals, extremes 1940−present)
Month	Jan	Feb	Mar	Apr	May	Jun	Jul	Aug	Sep	Oct	Nov	Dec	Year
Record high °C (°F)	19.5 (67.1)	22.8 (73.0)	25.0 (77.0)	33.0 (91.4)	33.0 (91.4)	38.0 (100.4)	37.8 (100.0)	39.3 (102.7)	36.0 (96.8)	27.0 (80.6)	24.0 (75.2)	20.3 (68.5)	39.3 (102.7)
Mean daily maximum °C (°F)	4.1 (39.4)	6.6 (43.9)	11.6 (52.9)	15.7 (60.3)	19.7 (67.5)	23.7 (74.7)	26.0 (78.8)	25.3 (77.5)	20.3 (68.5)	15.3 (59.5)	8.8 (47.8)	4.3 (39.7)	15.1 (59.2)
Daily mean °C (°F)	0.0 (32.0)	1.4 (34.5)	5.3 (41.5)	8.9 (48.0)	13.1 (55.6)	16.8 (62.2)	18.7 (65.7)	18.3 (64.9)	14.2 (57.6)	10.1 (50.2)	4.5 (40.1)	0.6 (33.1)	9.3 (48.7)
Mean daily minimum °C (°F)	−4.0 (24.8)	−3.9 (25.0)	−1.0 (30.2)	2.0 (35.6)	6.5 (43.7)	9.9 (49.8)	11.5 (52.7)	11.3 (52.3)	8.2 (46.8)	5.0 (41.0)	0.2 (32.4)	−3.0 (26.6)	3.6 (38.5)
Record low °C (°F)	−27.0 (−16.6)	−25.0 (−13.0)	−22.0 (−7.6)	−12.0 (10.4)	−6.7 (19.9)	−2.0 (28.4)	−1.0 (30.2)	−1.0 (30.2)	−4.5 (23.9)	−10.0 (14.0)	−16.7 (1.9)	−23.0 (−9.4)	−27.0 (−16.6)
Average precipitation mm (inches)	115.8 (4.56)	97.2 (3.83)	102.8 (4.05)	100.6 (3.96)	117.3 (4.62)	112.4 (4.43)	109.7 (4.32)	114.9 (4.52)	115.4 (4.54)	117.0 (4.61)	121.8 (4.80)	138.5 (5.45)	1,363.4 (53.68)
Average precipitation days (≥ 1.0 mm)	10.9	9.3	10.1	10.1	12.2	10.9	9.4	9.2	8.9	10.5	11.0	12.2	124.7
Source: Météo-France

== See also ==
- Communes of the Savoie department
