= Saint-Sulpice, Savoie =

Saint-Sulpice San Sorpicho (Savoyard)
- Commune
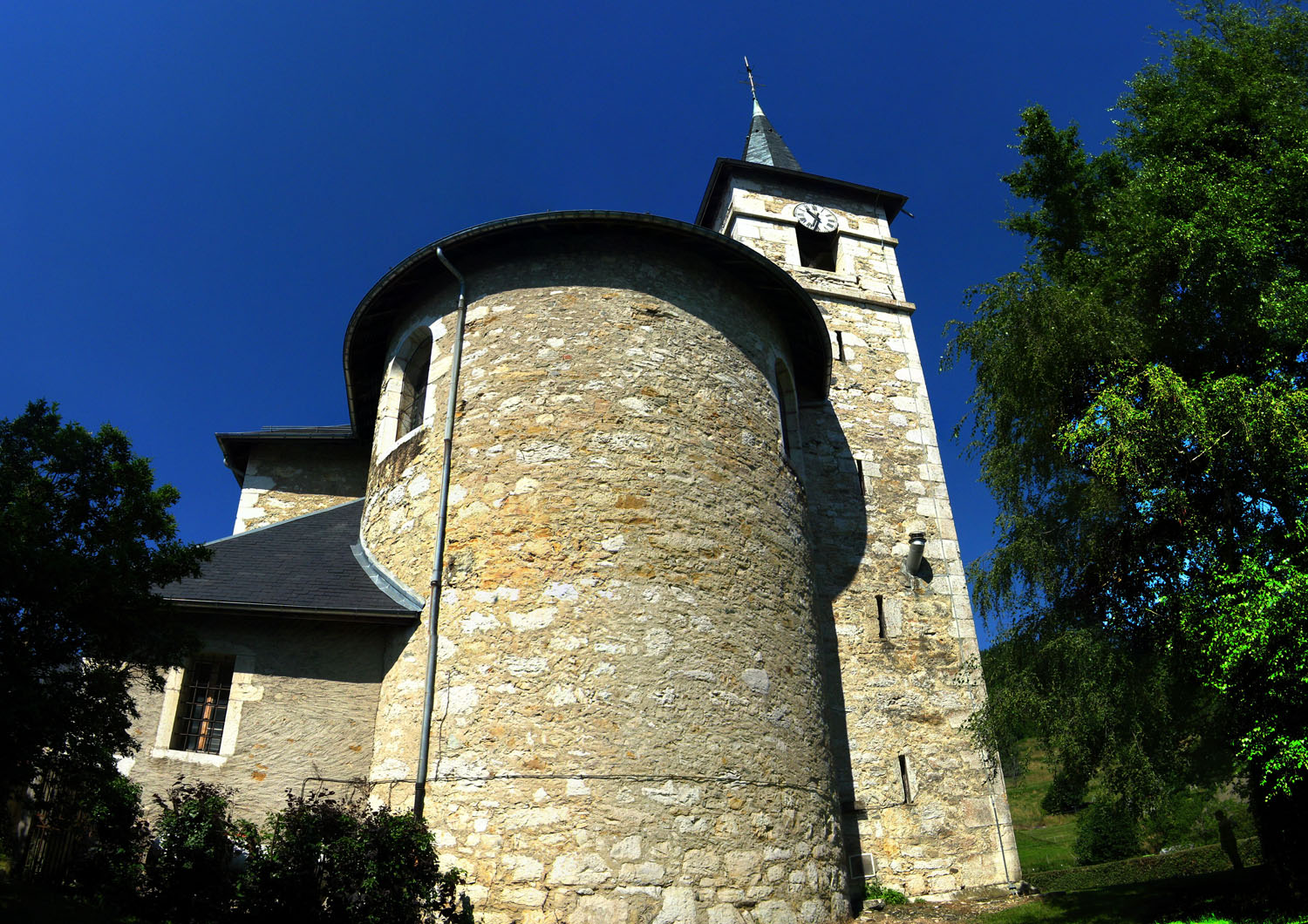
- The church in Saint-Sulpice

- Coat of arms
- Location of Saint-Sulpice
- Location within France Location within Auvergne-Rhône-Alpes
- Coordinates: 45°34′07″N 5°50′45″E
- Country: France
- Region: Auvergne-Rhône-Alpes
- Department: Savoie
- Arrondissement: Chambéry
- Canton: Le Pont-de-Beauvoisin
- Intercommunality: Grand Chambéry

Government
  - Mayor (2020–2026): Marcel Ferrari
- Area^{1}: 8.82 km^{2} (3.41 sq mi)
- Highest elevation: 1,041 m (3,415 ft)
- Lowest elevation: 352 m (1,155 ft)
- Population (2023): 821
  - Density: 93.1/km^{2} (241/sq mi)
- Time zone: UTC+01:00 (CET)
  - Summer (DST): UTC+02:00 (CEST)
- INSEE/Postal code: 73281 /73160
- ^{1} French Land Register data, which excludes lakes, ponds, glaciers > 1 km^{2} (0.386 sq mi or 247 acres) and river estuaries.

Saint-Sulpice (French pronunciation: [sɛ̃ sylpis]; Savoyard: San Sorpicho) is a commune in the Savoie department in the Auvergne-Rhône-Alpes region in south-eastern France.

== See also ==
- Communes of the Savoie department
