= Mont Margériaz =

Mountain in Savoie, France

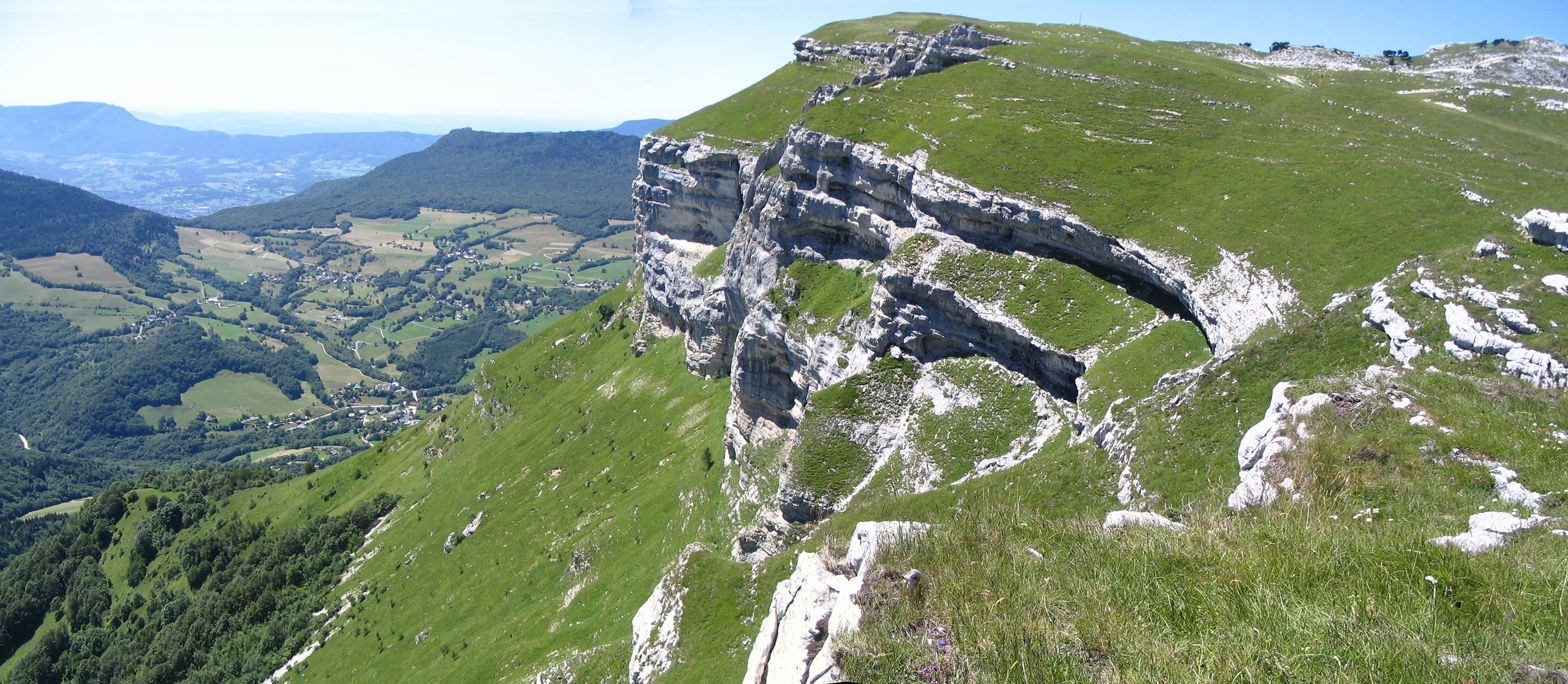

Highest point
- Elevation: 1,845 m (6,053 ft)
- Coordinates: 45°38′09″N 06°02′04″E

Geography
- Location within France
- Location: Savoie, France
- Parent range: Bauges

Mont Margériaz is a mountain of Savoie, France. It lies in the Bauges range. It has an elevation of 1,845 metres (6,053 ft) above sea level.
