= École, Savoie =

École
- Commune
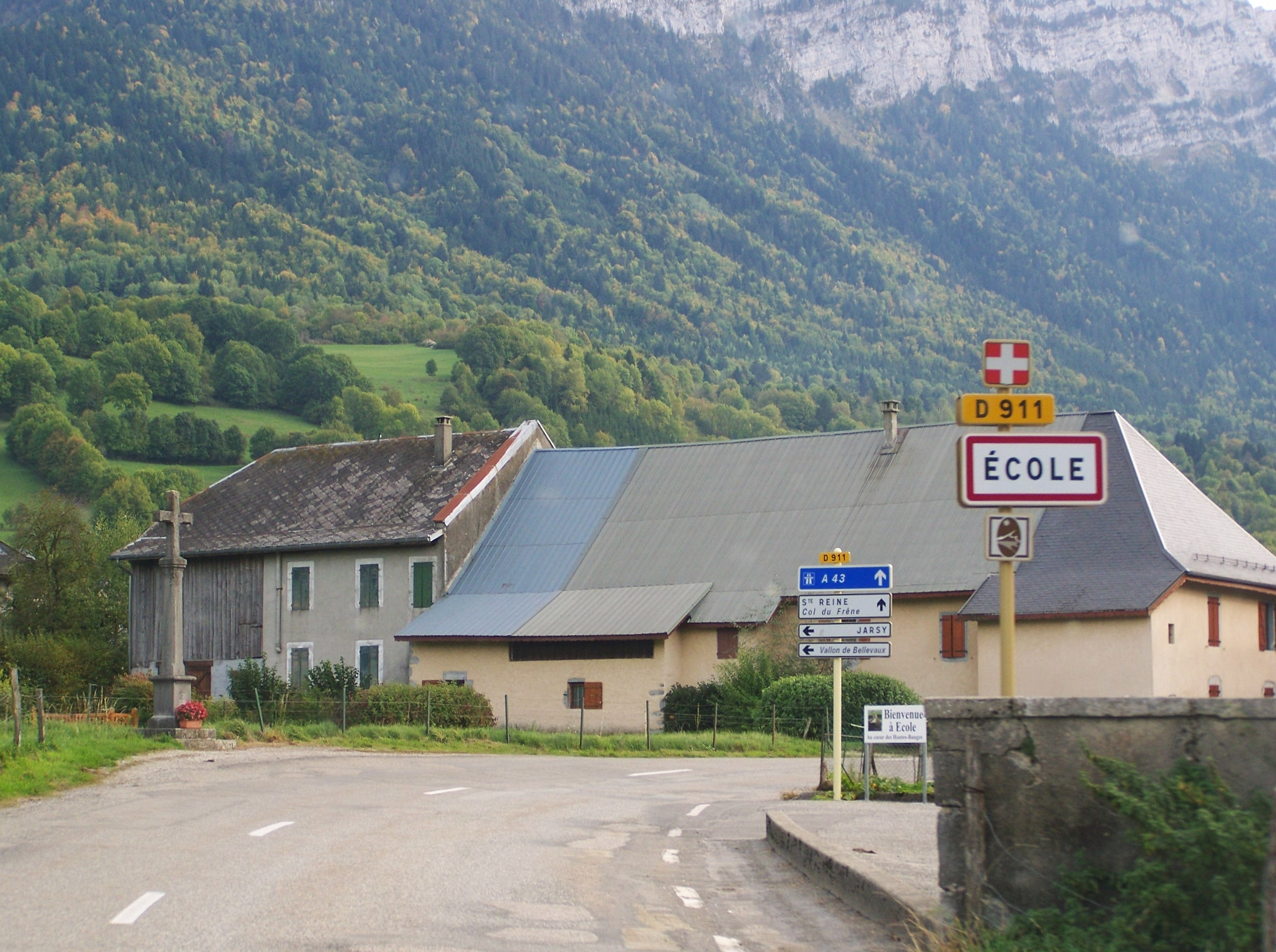
- The road into École

- Coat of arms
- Location of École
- Location within France Location within Auvergne-Rhône-Alpes
- Coordinates: 45°39′05″N 6°10′06″E
- Country: France
- Region: Auvergne-Rhône-Alpes
- Department: Savoie
- Arrondissement: Chambéry
- Canton: Saint-Alban-Leysse
- Intercommunality: Grand Chambéry

Government
  - Mayor (2020–2026): Hervé Ferroud-Plattet
- Area^{1}: 29.65 km^{2} (11.45 sq mi)
- Highest elevation: 2,186 m (7,172 ft)
- Lowest elevation: 696 m (2,283 ft)
- Population (2023): 305
  - Density: 10.3/km^{2} (26.6/sq mi)
- Time zone: UTC+01:00 (CET)
  - Summer (DST): UTC+02:00 (CEST)
- INSEE/Postal code: 73106 /73630
- ^{1} French Land Register data, which excludes lakes, ponds, glaciers > 1 km^{2} (0.386 sq mi or 247 acres) and river estuaries.

École (French pronunciation: [ekɔl]; Arpitan: Ekoule) is a commune in the Savoie department in the Auvergne-Rhône-Alpes region in south-eastern France.

== Geography ==
The village lies in the north-western part of the commune, on the left bank of the Chéran, which forms most of the commune's northern border.

== See also ==
- Communes of the Savoie department
