= Puygros =

Puygros Puégrôs (Arpitan)
- Commune
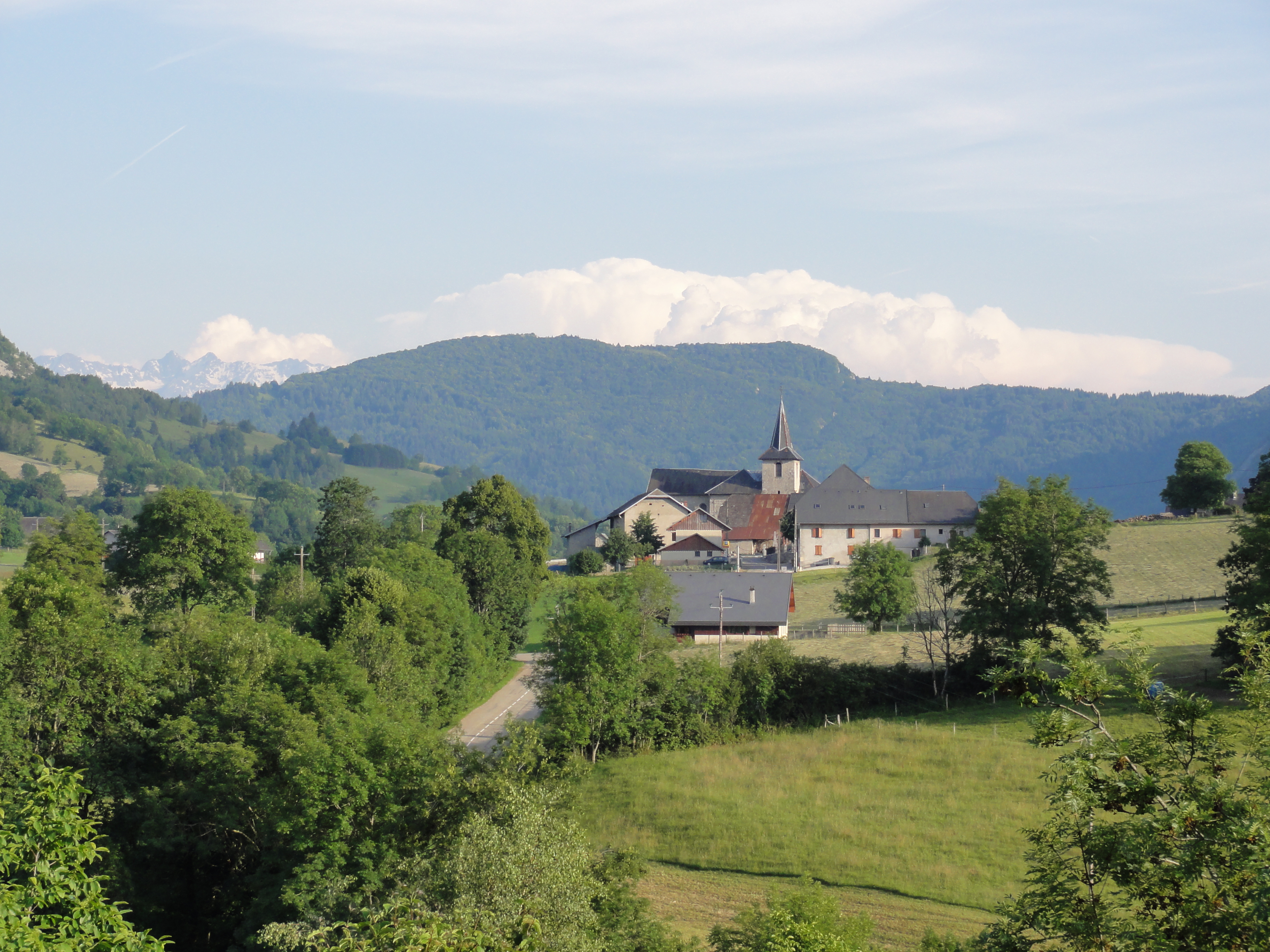
- The church and surroundings in Puygros
- Location of Puygros
- Location within France Location within Auvergne-Rhône-Alpes
- Coordinates: 45°34′07″N 6°02′04″E
- Country: France
- Region: Auvergne-Rhône-Alpes
- Department: Savoie
- Arrondissement: Chambéry
- Canton: Saint-Alban-Leysse
- Intercommunality: Grand Chambéry

Government
  - Mayor (2020–2026): Luc Meunier
- Area^{1}: 10.34 km^{2} (3.99 sq mi)
- Highest elevation: 1,680 m (5,510 ft)
- Lowest elevation: 393 m (1,289 ft)
- Population (2023): 406
  - Density: 39.3/km^{2} (102/sq mi)
- Time zone: UTC+01:00 (CET)
  - Summer (DST): UTC+02:00 (CEST)
- INSEE/Postal code: 73210 /73190
- Website: www.mairie-puygros.fr
- ^{1} French Land Register data, which excludes lakes, ponds, glaciers > 1 km^{2} (0.386 sq mi or 247 acres) and river estuaries.

Puygros (Arpitan: Puégrôs) is a commune in the Savoie department in the Auvergne-Rhône-Alpes region in Southeastern France. As of 2023, the population of the commune was 406.

== See also ==
- Communes of the Savoie department
