= Aillon-le-Jeune =

Aillon-le-Jeune Alyon-le-Joueno (Arpitan)
- Commune
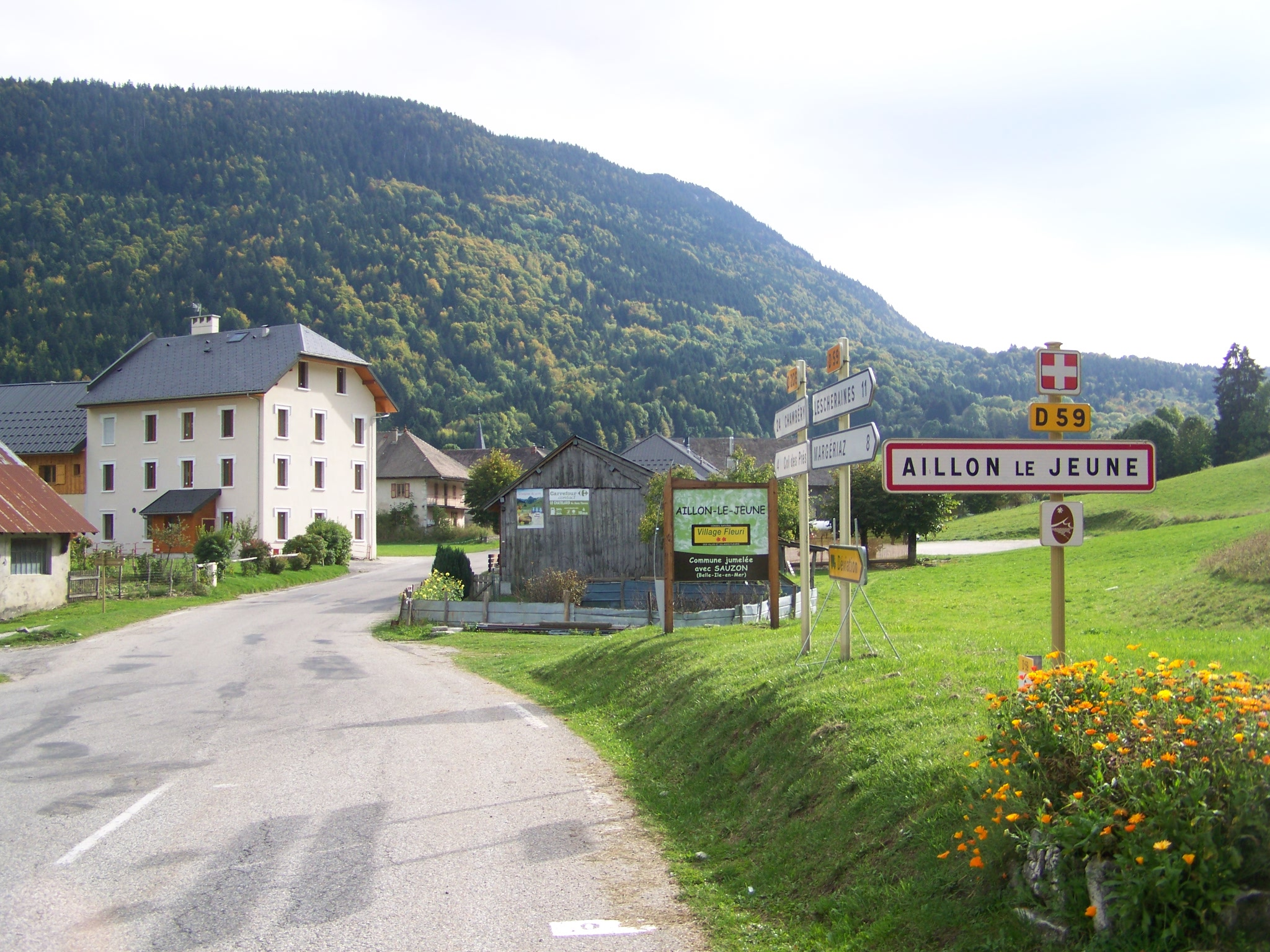
- The road into Aillon-le-Jeune
- Location of Aillon-le-Jeune
- Location within France Location within Auvergne-Rhône-Alpes
- Coordinates: 45°37′09″N 6°04′53″E
- Country: France
- Region: Auvergne-Rhône-Alpes
- Department: Savoie
- Arrondissement: Chambéry
- Canton: Saint-Alban-Leysse
- Intercommunality: Grand Chambéry

Government
  - Mayor (2020–2026): Serge Tichkiewitch
- Area^{1}: 34.09 km^{2} (13.16 sq mi)
- Highest elevation: 2,040 m (6,690 ft)
- Lowest elevation: 877 m (2,877 ft)
- Population (2023): 430
  - Density: 13/km^{2} (33/sq mi)
- Time zone: UTC+01:00 (CET)
  - Summer (DST): UTC+02:00 (CEST)
- INSEE/Postal code: 73004 /73340
- ^{1} French Land Register data, which excludes lakes, ponds, glaciers > 1 km^{2} (0.386 sq mi or 247 acres) and river estuaries.

Aillon-le-Jeune (French pronunciation: [ajɔ̃ lə ʒœn]; Arpitan: Alyon-le-Joueno) is a commune in the Savoie department in the Auvergne-Rhône-Alpes region, Southeastern France.

== Demographics ==
Historical population
Year	Pop.	±% p.a.
1968	211	—
1975	225	+0.92%
1982	250	+1.52%
1990	261	+0.54%
1999	337	+2.88%
2007	435	+3.24%
2012	438	+0.14%
2017	434	−0.18%
2023	430	−0.15%
Source: INSEE

== See also ==
- Communes of the Savoie department
