= Saint-Jean-d'Arvey =

Saint-Jean-d'Arvey Sant-Jian-d'Arvê (Arpitan)
- Commune
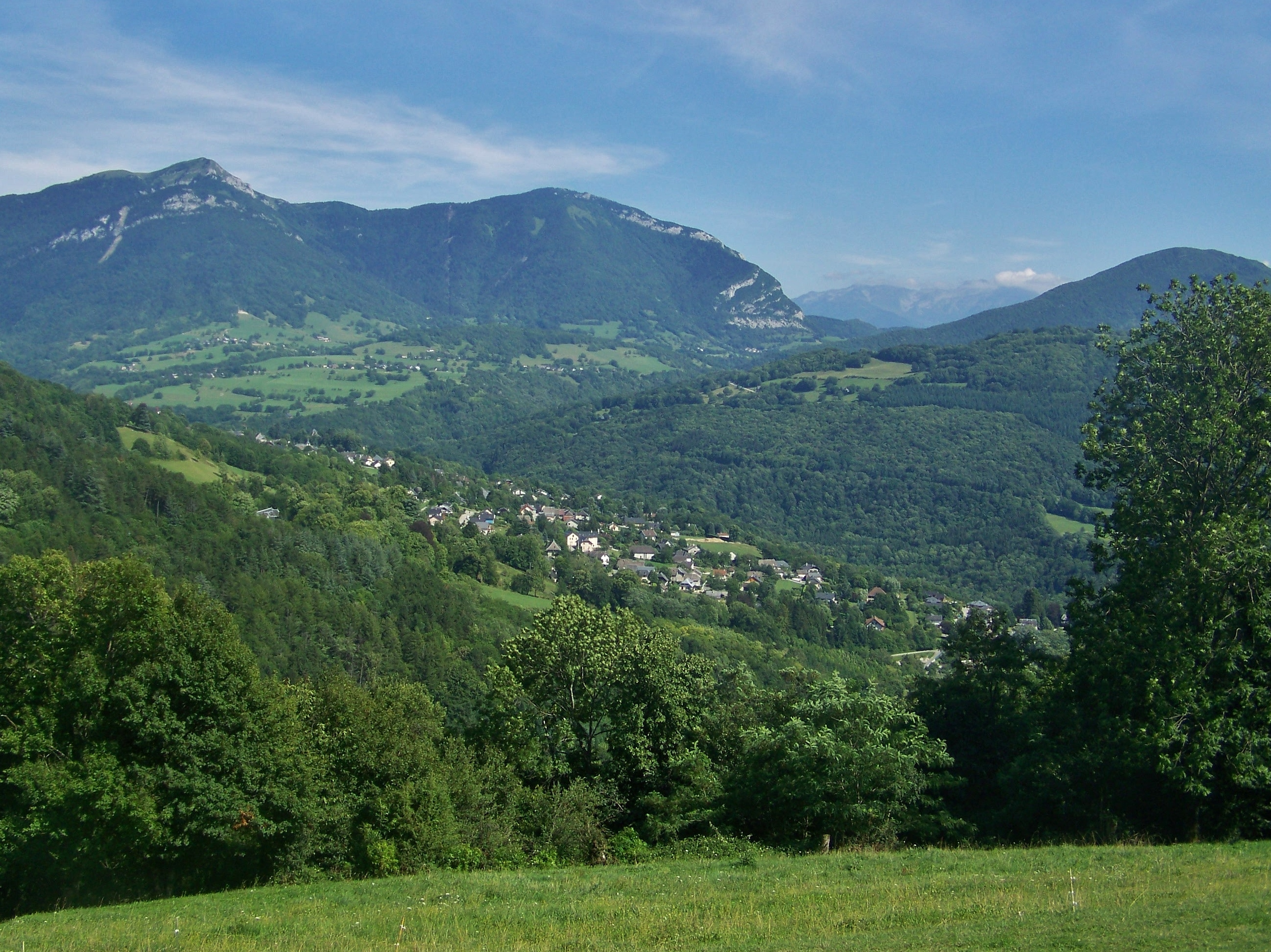
- A general view of Saint-Jean-d'Arvey
- Location of Saint-Jean-d'Arvey
- Location within France Location within Auvergne-Rhône-Alpes
- Coordinates: 45°35′13″N 5°59′50″E
- Country: France
- Region: Auvergne-Rhône-Alpes
- Department: Savoie
- Arrondissement: Chambéry
- Canton: Saint-Alban-Leysse
- Intercommunality: Grand Chambéry

Government
  - Mayor (2020–2026): Christian Berthomier
- Area^{1}: 13.01 km^{2} (5.02 sq mi)
- Highest elevation: 1,545 m (5,069 ft)
- Lowest elevation: 328 m (1,076 ft)
- Population (2023): 1,721
  - Density: 132.3/km^{2} (342.6/sq mi)
- Time zone: UTC+01:00 (CET)
  - Summer (DST): UTC+02:00 (CEST)
- INSEE/Postal code: 73243 /73230
- ^{1} French Land Register data, which excludes lakes, ponds, glaciers > 1 km^{2} (0.386 sq mi or 247 acres) and river estuaries.

Saint-Jean-d'Arvey (French pronunciation: [sɛ̃ ʒɑ̃ daʁvɛ]; Arpitan: Sant-Jian-d'Arvê) is a commune in the Savoie department in the Auvergne-Rhône-Alpes region in Southeastern France. It is part of the urban area of Chambéry. As of 2023, the population of the commune was 1,721.

== See also ==
- Communes of the Savoie department
