= Vimines =

Vimines Vemene (Savoyard)
- Commune
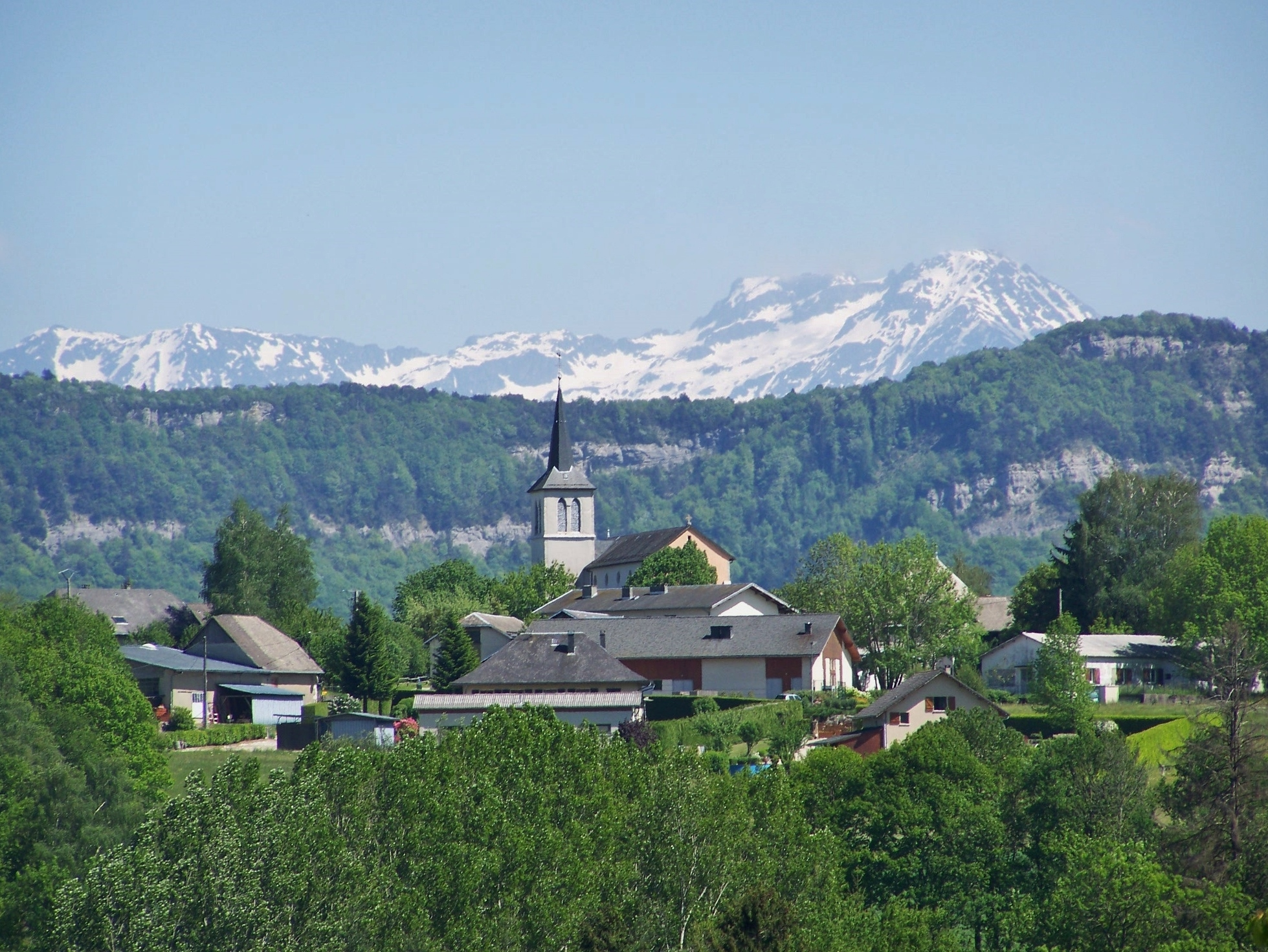
- The church and surrounding buildings in Vimines
- Location of Vimines
- Location within France Location within Auvergne-Rhône-Alpes
- Coordinates: 45°32′47″N 5°51′56″E
- Country: France
- Region: Auvergne-Rhône-Alpes
- Department: Savoie
- Arrondissement: Chambéry
- Canton: Le Pont-de-Beauvoisin
- Intercommunality: Grand Chambéry

Government
  - Mayor (2020–2026): Corine Wolff
- Area^{1}: 14.23 km^{2} (5.49 sq mi)
- Highest elevation: 1,378 m (4,521 ft)
- Lowest elevation: 320 m (1,050 ft)
- Population (2023): 2,372
  - Density: 166.7/km^{2} (431.7/sq mi)
- Time zone: UTC+01:00 (CET)
  - Summer (DST): UTC+02:00 (CEST)
- INSEE/Postal code: 73326 /73160
- Website: www.vimines.com
- ^{1} French Land Register data, which excludes lakes, ponds, glaciers > 1 km^{2} (0.386 sq mi or 247 acres) and river estuaries.

Vimines (French pronunciation: [vimin]; Savoyard: Vemene) is a commune in the Savoie department in the Auvergne-Rhône-Alpes region in south-eastern France. It is part of the urban area of Chambéry.

== Population ==
Historical population
Year	Pop.	±% p.a.
1968	640	—
1975	862	+4.35%
1982	1,171	+4.47%
1990	1,351	+1.80%
1999	1,496	+1.14%
2007	1,655	+1.27%
2012	1,846	+2.21%
2017	2,028	+1.90%
2023	2,372	+2.65%
Source: INSEE

== See also ==
- Communes of the Savoie department
