= Thoiry, Savoie =

Thoiry Touéri (Savoyard)
- Commune
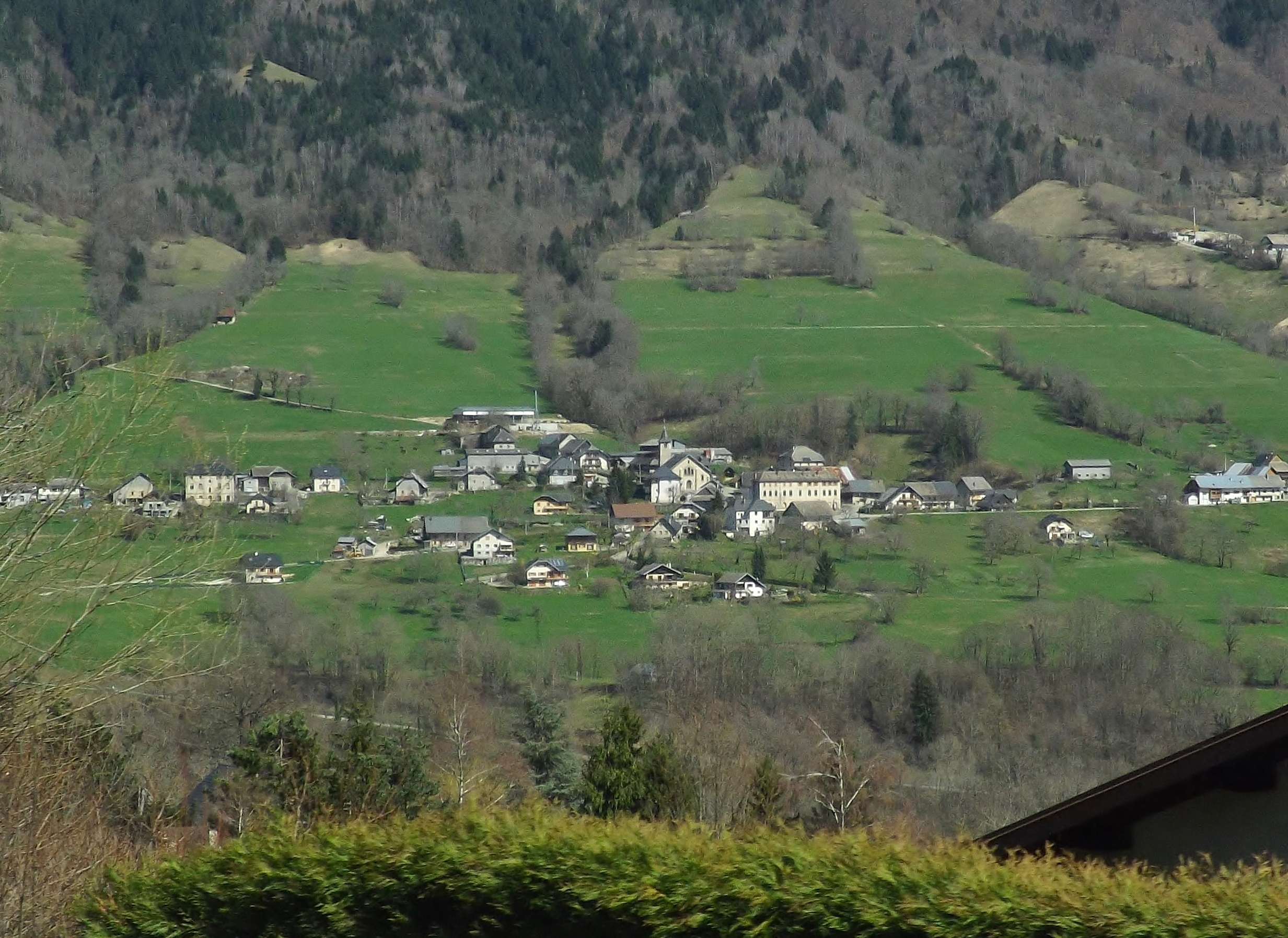
- A general view of Thoiry
- Location of Thoiry
- Location within France Location within Auvergne-Rhône-Alpes
- Coordinates: 45°35′32″N 6°01′48″E
- Country: France
- Region: Auvergne-Rhône-Alpes
- Department: Savoie
- Arrondissement: Chambéry
- Canton: Saint-Alban-Leysse
- Intercommunality: Grand Chambéry

Government
  - Mayor (2020–2026): Thierry Tournier
- Area^{1}: 17.75 km^{2} (6.85 sq mi)
- Highest elevation: 1,780 m (5,840 ft)
- Lowest elevation: 458 m (1,503 ft)
- Population (2023): 456
  - Density: 25.7/km^{2} (66.5/sq mi)
- Time zone: UTC+01:00 (CET)
  - Summer (DST): UTC+02:00 (CEST)
- INSEE/Postal code: 73293 /73230
- ^{1} French Land Register data, which excludes lakes, ponds, glaciers > 1 km^{2} (0.386 sq mi or 247 acres) and river estuaries.

Thoiry (French pronunciation: [twaʁi]; Savoyard: Touéri) is a commune in the Savoie department in the Auvergne-Rhône-Alpes region in south-eastern France.

== See also ==
- Communes of the Savoie department
