= Curienne =

Curienne Curièna (Arpitan)
- Commune
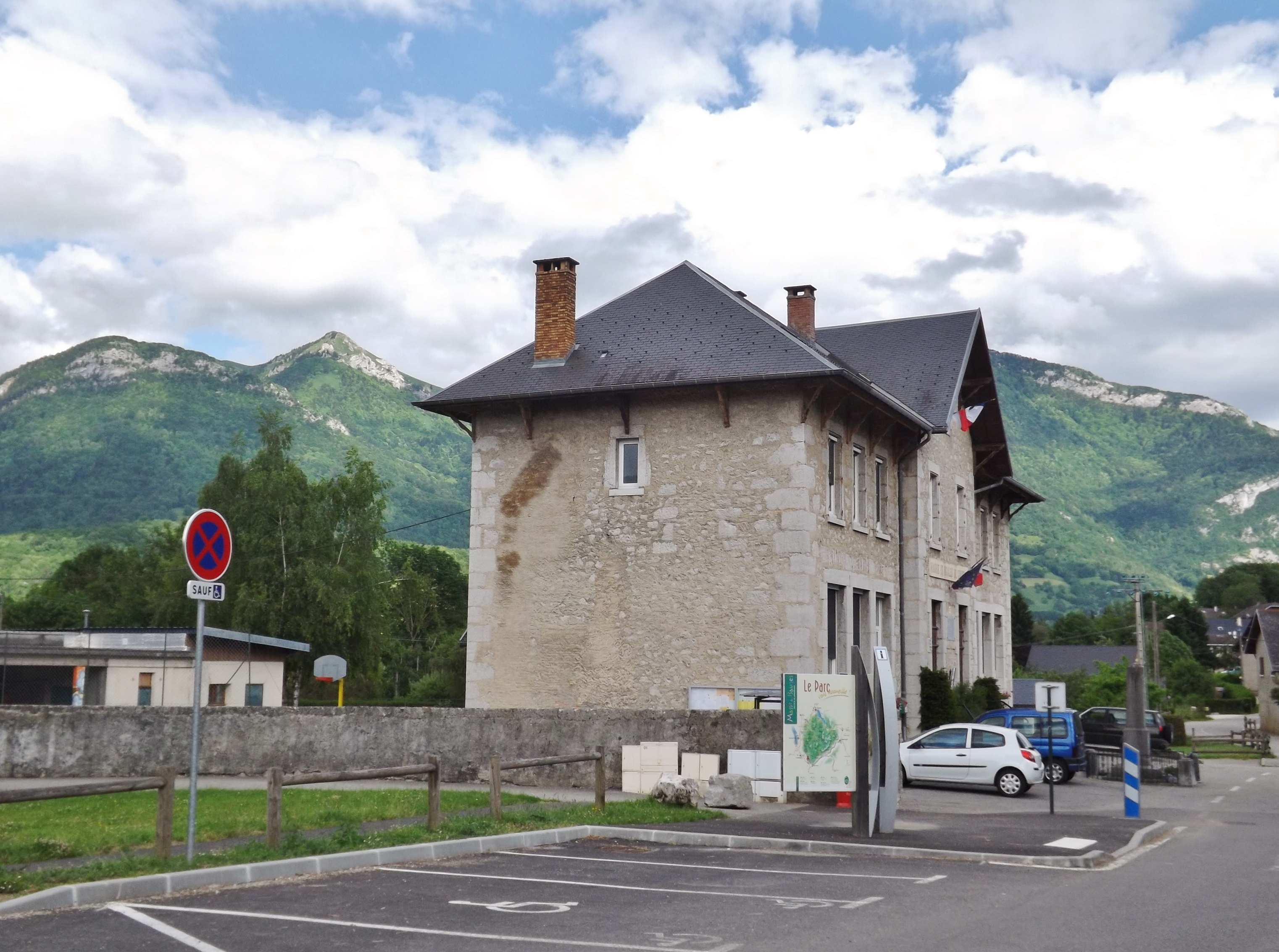
- Curienne Town Hall
- Location of Curienne
- Location within France Location within Auvergne-Rhône-Alpes
- Coordinates: 45°34′01″N 6°00′37″E
- Country: France
- Region: Auvergne-Rhône-Alpes
- Department: Savoie
- Arrondissement: Chambéry
- Canton: Saint-Alban-Leysse
- Intercommunality: CA Grand Chambéry

Government
  - Mayor (2020–2026): Stéphane Bochet
- Area^{1}: 8.55 km^{2} (3.30 sq mi)
- Highest elevation: 1,290 m (4,230 ft)
- Lowest elevation: 360 m (1,180 ft)
- Population (2023): 704
  - Density: 82.3/km^{2} (213/sq mi)
- Demonym: Cessanais
- Time zone: UTC+01:00 (CET)
  - Summer (DST): UTC+02:00 (CEST)
- INSEE/Postal code: 73097 /73190
- Website: www.mairie-curienne.fr
- ^{1} French Land Register data, which excludes lakes, ponds, glaciers > 1 km^{2} (0.386 sq mi or 247 acres) and river estuaries.

Curienne (French pronunciation: [kyʁjɛn]; Arpitan: Curièna) is a commune in the Savoie department in the Auvergne-Rhône-Alpes region in Southeastern France. As of 2023, the population of the commune was 704.

== See also ==
- Communes of the Savoie department
