= Les Déserts =

Les Déserts Lou Dézèr (Savoyard)
- Commune
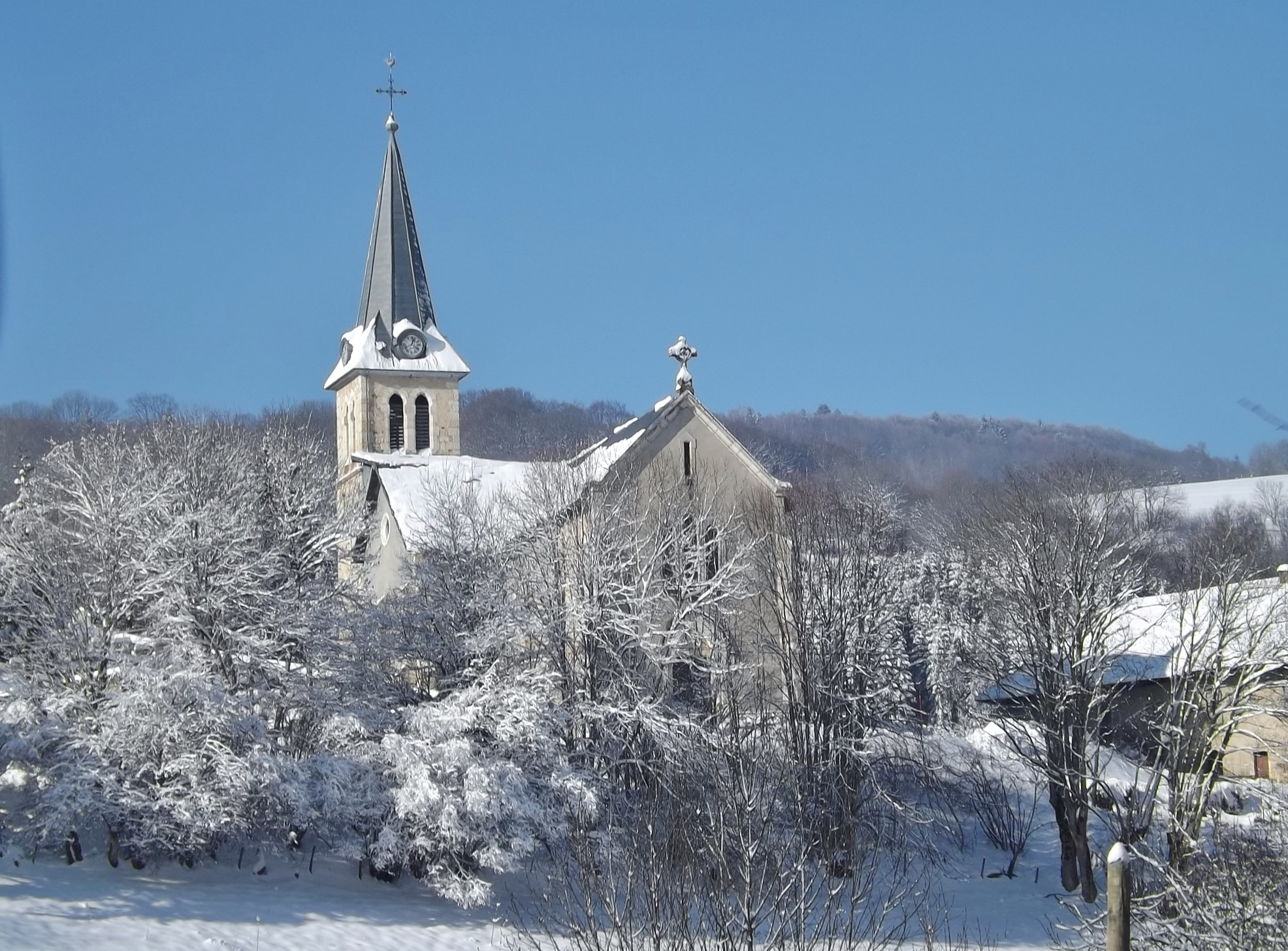
- The church in Les Déserts
- Location of Les Déserts
- Location within France Location within Auvergne-Rhône-Alpes
- Coordinates: 45°37′20″N 6°00′43″E
- Country: France
- Region: Auvergne-Rhône-Alpes
- Department: Savoie
- Arrondissement: Chambéry
- Canton: Saint-Alban-Leysse
- Intercommunality: Grand Chambéry

Government
  - Mayor (2020–2026): Sandra Ferrari
- Area^{1}: 33.59 km^{2} (12.97 sq mi)
- Highest elevation: 1,845 m (6,053 ft)
- Lowest elevation: 636 m (2,087 ft)
- Population (2023): 845
  - Density: 25.2/km^{2} (65.2/sq mi)
- Time zone: UTC+01:00 (CET)
  - Summer (DST): UTC+02:00 (CEST)
- INSEE/Postal code: 73098 /73230
- ^{1} French Land Register data, which excludes lakes, ponds, glaciers > 1 km^{2} (0.386 sq mi or 247 acres) and river estuaries.

Les Déserts (French pronunciation: [le dezɛʁ]; Savoyard: Lou Dézèr) is a commune in the Savoie department in the Auvergne-Rhône-Alpes region in south-eastern France.

== Geography ==
=== Climate ===
Les Déserts has a humid continental climate (Köppen climate classification Dfb) closely bordering on a subarctic climate (Dfc). The average annual temperature in Les Déserts is 6.2 °C (43.2 °F). The average annual rainfall is 1,652.2 mm (65.05 in) with December as the wettest month. The temperatures are highest on average in July, at around 14.6 °C (58.3 °F), and lowest in January, at around −1.3 °C (29.7 °F). The highest temperature ever recorded in Les Déserts was 32.5 °C (90.5 °F) on 27 June 2019; the coldest temperature ever recorded was −24.0 °C (−11.2 °F) on 5 February 2012.

Climate data for Les Déserts (1991−2020 normals, extremes 1993−present)
Month	Jan	Feb	Mar	Apr	May	Jun	Jul	Aug	Sep	Oct	Nov	Dec	Year
Record high °C (°F)	14.8 (58.6)	17.5 (63.5)	18.4 (65.1)	21.1 (70.0)	26.2 (79.2)	32.5 (90.5)	31.3 (88.3)	30.2 (86.4)	24.6 (76.3)	22.7 (72.9)	19.2 (66.6)	16.0 (60.8)	32.5 (90.5)
Mean daily maximum °C (°F)	2.5 (36.5)	2.7 (36.9)	5.8 (42.4)	9.1 (48.4)	13.3 (55.9)	17.3 (63.1)	19.5 (67.1)	19.2 (66.6)	15.1 (59.2)	11.9 (53.4)	6.3 (43.3)	3.3 (37.9)	10.5 (50.9)
Daily mean °C (°F)	−1.3 (29.7)	−1.3 (29.7)	1.5 (34.7)	4.7 (40.5)	8.8 (47.8)	12.6 (54.7)	14.6 (58.3)	14.5 (58.1)	10.7 (51.3)	7.6 (45.7)	2.5 (36.5)	−0.4 (31.3)	6.2 (43.2)
Mean daily minimum °C (°F)	−5.0 (23.0)	−5.3 (22.5)	−2.7 (27.1)	0.3 (32.5)	4.3 (39.7)	7.9 (46.2)	9.6 (49.3)	9.7 (49.5)	6.2 (43.2)	3.4 (38.1)	−1.3 (29.7)	−4.1 (24.6)	1.9 (35.4)
Record low °C (°F)	−18.8 (−1.8)	−24 (−11)	−18.6 (−1.5)	−10.8 (12.6)	−5.5 (22.1)	−2.5 (27.5)	0.6 (33.1)	−1.1 (30.0)	−2.5 (27.5)	−9.7 (14.5)	−14.4 (6.1)	−19.2 (−2.6)	−24.0 (−11.2)
Average precipitation mm (inches)	136.7 (5.38)	116.1 (4.57)	124.7 (4.91)	128.3 (5.05)	155.1 (6.11)	137.6 (5.42)	138.7 (5.46)	136.6 (5.38)	141.9 (5.59)	137.6 (5.42)	143.6 (5.65)	155.3 (6.11)	1,652.2 (65.05)
Average precipitation days (≥ 1.0 mm)	11.9	10.3	11.5	11.1	13.1	11.6	10.0	10.0	9.8	11.2	11.7	13.1	135.4
Source: Météo-France

== See also ==
- Communes of the Savoie department
