= Montagnole =

Montagnole Montanyoula (Savoyard)
- Commune
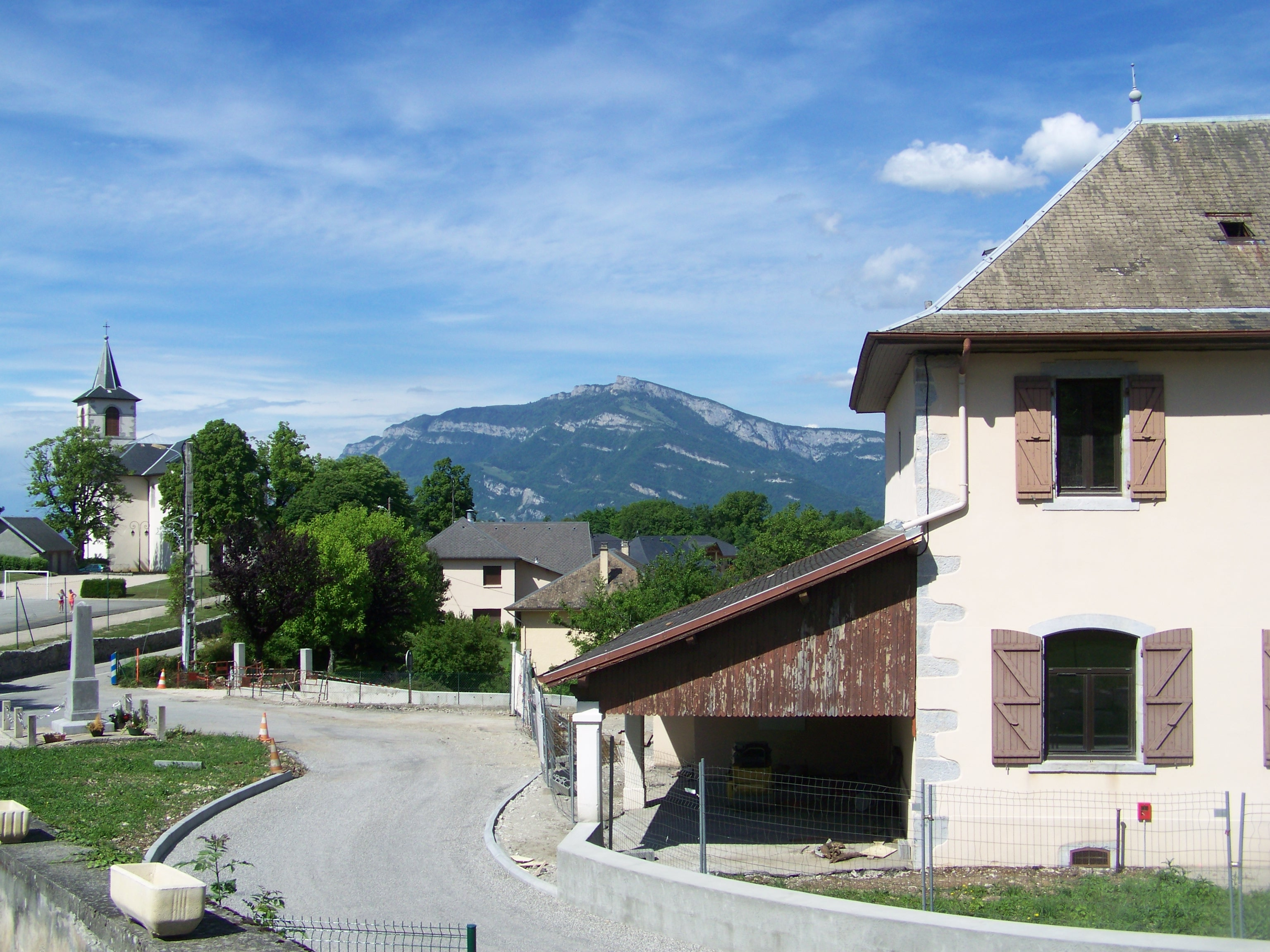
- The church and town hall in Montagnole
- Location of Montagnole
- Location within France Location within Auvergne-Rhône-Alpes
- Coordinates: 45°32′20″N 5°54′33″E
- Country: France
- Region: Auvergne-Rhône-Alpes
- Department: Savoie
- Arrondissement: Chambéry
- Canton: Le Pont-de-Beauvoisin
- Intercommunality: CA Grand Chambéry

Government
  - Mayor (2020–2026): Jean-Maurice Venturini
- Area^{1}: 11.3 km^{2} (4.4 sq mi)
- Highest elevation: 1,445 m (4,741 ft)
- Lowest elevation: 360 m (1,180 ft)
- Population (2023): 1,038
  - Density: 91.9/km^{2} (238/sq mi)
- Time zone: UTC+01:00 (CET)
  - Summer (DST): UTC+02:00 (CEST)
- INSEE/Postal code: 73160 /73000
- Website: www.mairie-montagnole.fr
- ^{1} French Land Register data, which excludes lakes, ponds, glaciers > 1 km^{2} (0.386 sq mi or 247 acres) and river estuaries.

Montagnole (French pronunciation: [mɔ̃taɲɔl]; Savoyard: Montanyoula) is a commune in the Savoie department in the Auvergne-Rhône-Alpes region in south-eastern France.

== See also ==
- Communes of the Savoie department
