= Bassens, Savoie =

Bassens Bassè (Savoyard)
- Commune
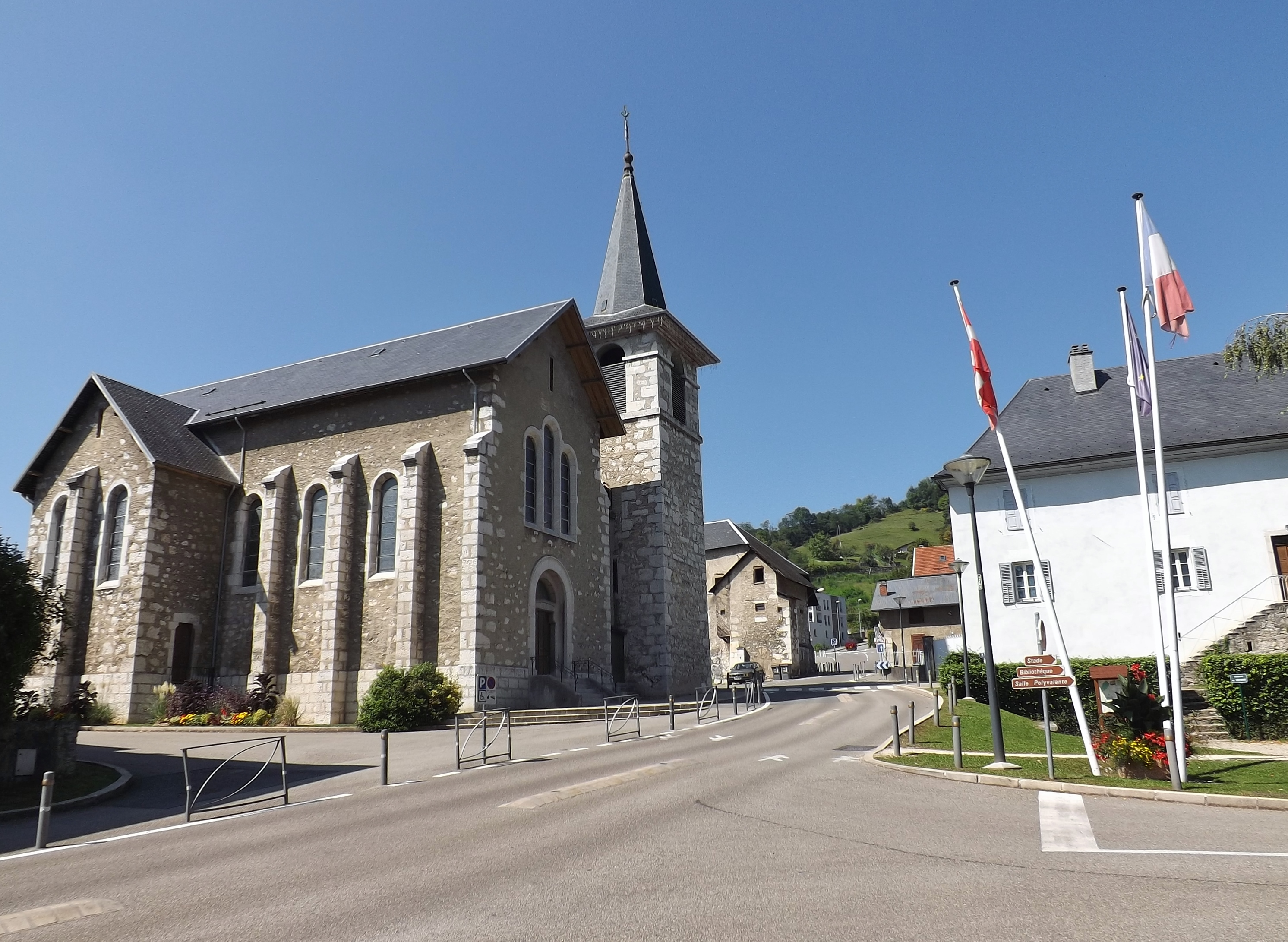
- The church in Bassens
- Location of Bassens
- Location within France Location within Auvergne-Rhône-Alpes
- Coordinates: 45°34′32″N 5°56′24″E
- Country: France
- Region: Auvergne-Rhône-Alpes
- Department: Savoie
- Arrondissement: Chambéry
- Canton: Saint-Alban-Leysse
- Intercommunality: Grand Chambéry

Government
  - Mayor (2024–2026): Catherine Anxionnaz
- Area^{1}: 3.11 km^{2} (1.20 sq mi)
- Highest elevation: 810 m (2,660 ft)
- Lowest elevation: 280 m (920 ft)
- Population (2023): 5,175
  - Density: 1,660/km^{2} (4,310/sq mi)
- Time zone: UTC+01:00 (CET)
  - Summer (DST): UTC+02:00 (CEST)
- INSEE/Postal code: 73031 /73000
- ^{1} French Land Register data, which excludes lakes, ponds, glaciers > 1 km^{2} (0.386 sq mi or 247 acres) and river estuaries.

Bassens (French pronunciation: [basɛ̃]; Arpitan: Bassè) is a commune in the Savoie department in the Auvergne-Rhône-Alpes region in south-eastern France.

== Population ==
Historical population
Year	Pop.	±% p.a.
1968	3,548	—
1975	4,016	+1.79%
1982	3,625	−1.45%
1990	3,577	−0.17%
1999	3,503	−0.23%
2007	3,815	+1.07%
2012	3,863	+0.25%
2017	4,466	+2.94%
2023	5,175	+2.49%
Source: INSEE

== See also ==
- Communes of the Savoie department
