= La Motte-en-Bauges =

- Commune
- Location of La Motte-en-Bauges
- Location within France Location within Auvergne-Rhône-Alpes
- Coordinates: 45°42′10″N 6°07′49″E
- Country: France
- Region: Auvergne-Rhône-Alpes
- Department: Savoie
- Arrondissement: Chambéry
- Canton: Saint-Alban-Leysse
- Intercommunality: Grand Chambéry

Government
  - Mayor (2020–2026): Damien Regairaz
- Area^{1}: 9.96 km^{2} (3.85 sq mi)
- Highest elevation: 1,474 m (4,836 ft)
- Lowest elevation: 598 m (1,962 ft)
- Population (2023): 539
  - Density: 54.1/km^{2} (140/sq mi)
- Time zone: UTC+01:00 (CET)
  - Summer (DST): UTC+02:00 (CEST)
- INSEE/Postal code: 73178 /73340
- Website: www.la-motte-en-bauges.com
- ^{1} French Land Register data, which excludes lakes, ponds, glaciers > 1 km^{2} (0.386 sq mi or 247 acres) and river estuaries.

La Motte-en-Bauges (French pronunciation: [la mɔt ɑ̃ boʒ], lit. 'La Motte in Bauges') is a commune in the Savoie department in the Auvergne-Rhône-Alpes region in south-eastern France.

== See also ==
- Communes of the Savoie department
