= La Thuile, Savoie =

La Thuile
- Commune
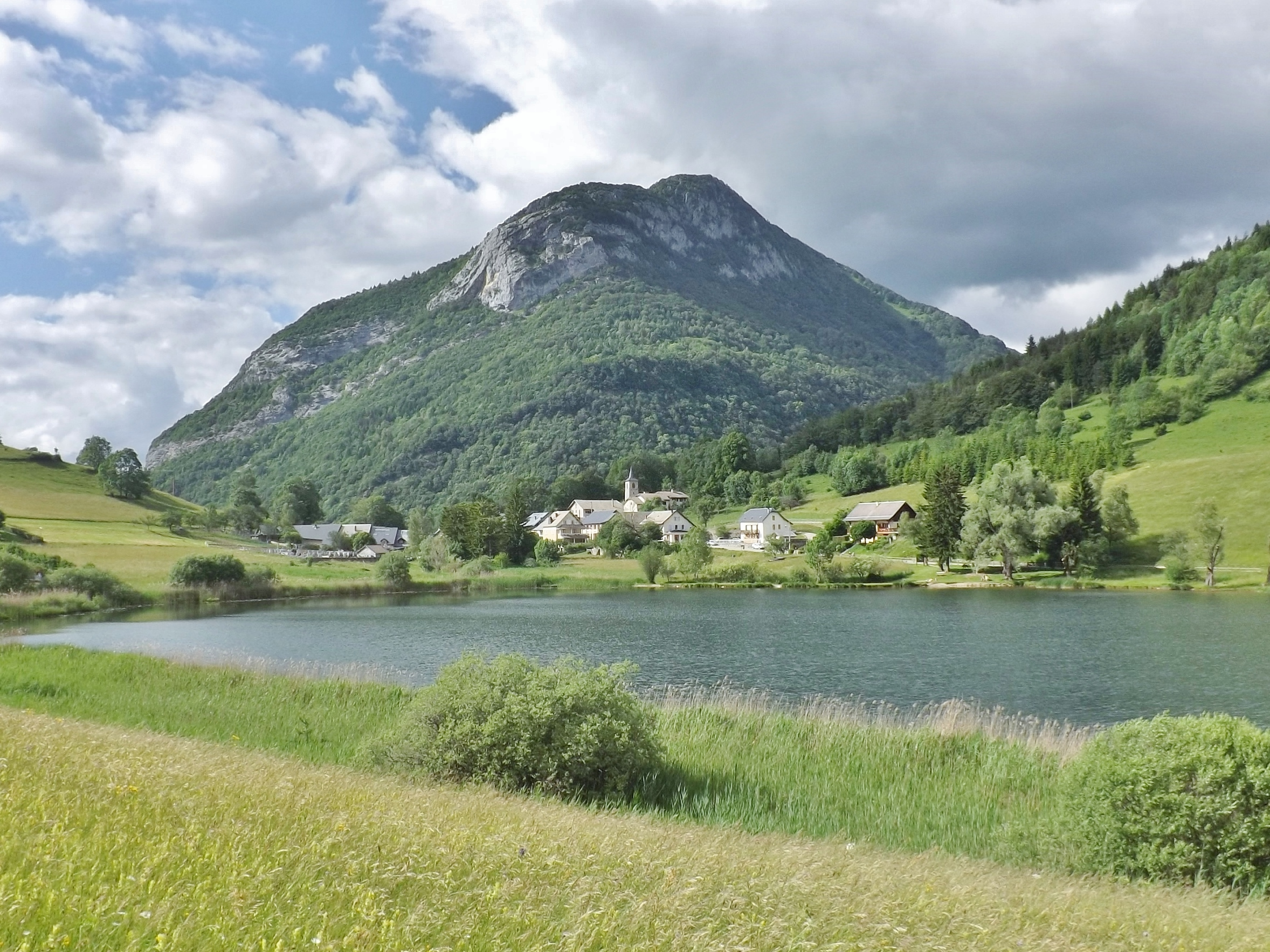
- A general view of La Thuile and the lake
- Location of La Thuile
- Location within France Location within Auvergne-Rhône-Alpes
- Coordinates: 45°32′00″N 6°03′25″E
- Country: France
- Region: Auvergne-Rhône-Alpes
- Department: Savoie
- Arrondissement: Chambéry
- Canton: Saint-Alban-Leysse
- Intercommunality: Grand Chambéry

Government
  - Mayor (2023–2026): Jean-François Poitou
- Area^{1}: 18.26 km^{2} (7.05 sq mi)
- Highest elevation: 1,640 m (5,380 ft)
- Lowest elevation: 656 m (2,152 ft)
- Population (2023): 353
  - Density: 19.3/km^{2} (50.1/sq mi)
- Time zone: UTC+01:00 (CET)
  - Summer (DST): UTC+02:00 (CEST)
- INSEE/Postal code: 73294 /73190
- ^{1} French Land Register data, which excludes lakes, ponds, glaciers > 1 km^{2} (0.386 sq mi or 247 acres) and river estuaries.

La Thuile (French pronunciation: [la tɥil]; Arpitan: La Teulye) is a commune in the Savoie department in the Auvergne-Rhône-Alpes region in south-eastern France.

== See also ==
- Communes of the Savoie department
