= Aiguebelle =

Aiguebelle Égouabèla (Arpitan)
- Part of Val-d'Arc
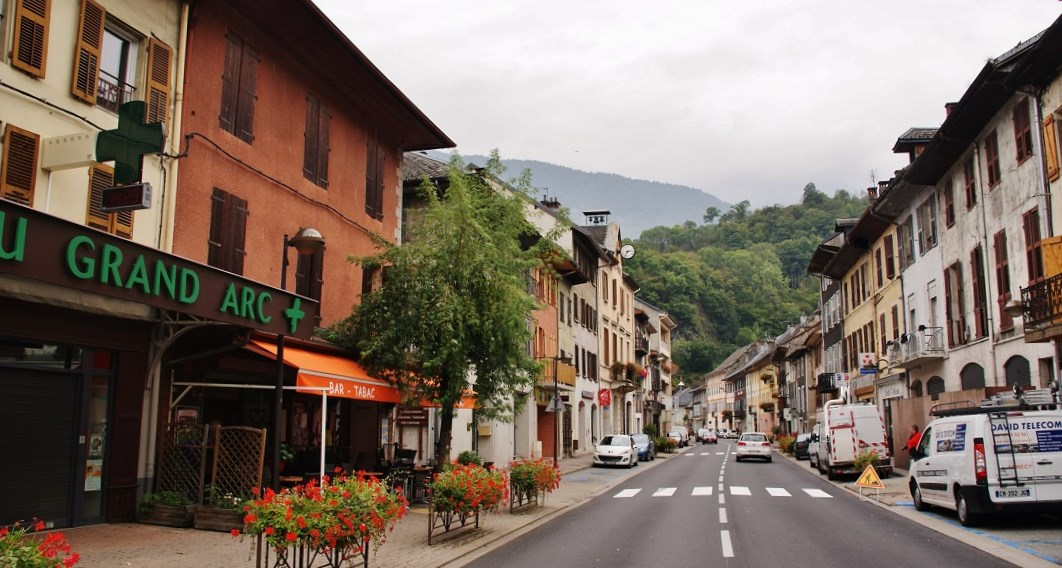
- The main street in Aiguebelle

- Coat of arms
- Location of Aiguebelle
- Location within France Location within Auvergne-Rhône-Alpes
- Coordinates: 45°32′36″N 6°18′22″E
- Country: France
- Region: Auvergne-Rhône-Alpes
- Department: Savoie
- Arrondissement: Saint-Jean-de-Maurienne
- Canton: Saint-Pierre-d'Albigny
- Commune: Val-d'Arc
- Area^{1}: 3.85 km^{2} (1.49 sq mi)
- Elevation: 323 m (1,060 ft)
- Highest elevation: 1,008 m (3,307 ft)
- Lowest elevation: 310 m (1,020 ft)
- Population (2021): 1,196
  - Density: 311/km^{2} (805/sq mi)
- Time zone: UTC+01:00 (CET)
  - Summer (DST): UTC+02:00 (CEST)
- Postal code: 73220
- ^{1} French Land Register data, which excludes lakes, ponds, glaciers > 1 km^{2} (0.386 sq mi or 247 acres) and river estuaries.

Aiguebelle (French pronunciation: [ɛɡbɛl]; Arpitan: Égouabèla) is a former commune in the Savoie department in the Auvergne-Rhône-Alpes region in south-eastern France. On 1 January 2019, it was merged into the new commune Val-d'Arc.

== Population ==
Historical population
Year	Pop.	±% p.a.
2006	1,058	—
2011	1,142	+1.54%
2015	1,169	+0.59%
2021	1,196	+0.38%
Source: INSEE

== See also ==
- Communes of the Savoie department
- Aiguebelle station
