= Chamoux =

Chamoux may refer to:

Surnames

- Benoît Chamoux, a French alpinist
- François Chamoux, a French hellenist
- Jean Chamoux, a French photographer

Places

- Chamoux, a commune in the French département of Yonne, region of Bourgogne
- Chamoux-sur-Gelon, a commune in the French département of Savoie
