= Randens =

Randens Randè (Arpitan)
- Part of Val-d'Arc
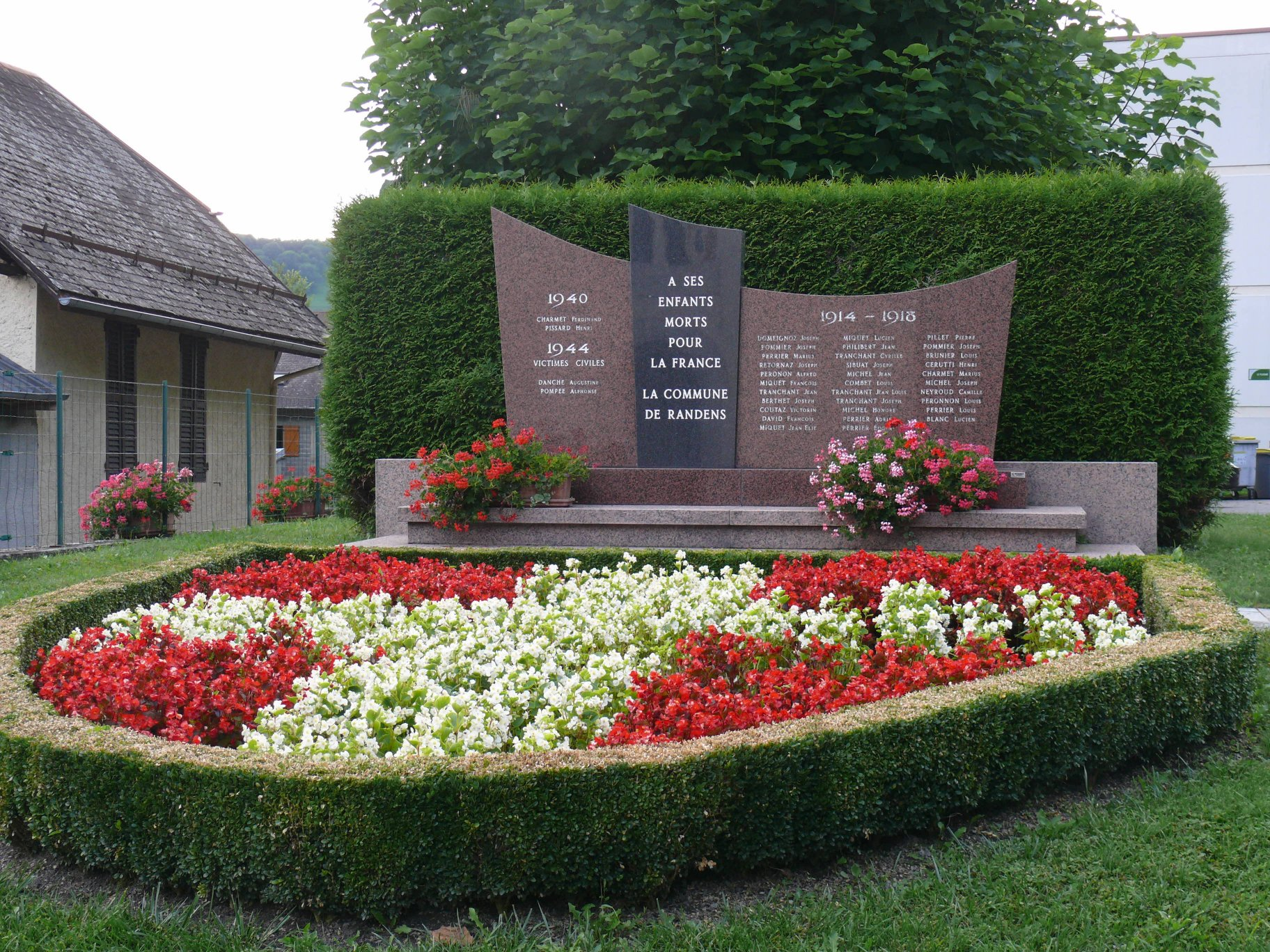
- The war memorial in Randens
- Location of Randens
- Location within France Location within Auvergne-Rhône-Alpes
- Coordinates: 45°32′42″N 6°18′39″E
- Country: France
- Region: Auvergne-Rhône-Alpes
- Department: Savoie
- Arrondissement: Saint-Jean-de-Maurienne
- Canton: Saint-Pierre-d'Albigny
- Commune: Val-d'Arc
- Area^{1}: 10.36 km^{2} (4.00 sq mi)
- Highest elevation: 2,162 m (7,093 ft)
- Lowest elevation: 306 m (1,004 ft)
- Population (2022): 820
  - Density: 79/km^{2} (200/sq mi)
- Time zone: UTC+01:00 (CET)
  - Summer (DST): UTC+02:00 (CEST)
- Postal code: 73220
- Website: www.randens.com
- ^{1} French Land Register data, which excludes lakes, ponds, glaciers > 1 km^{2} (0.386 sq mi or 247 acres) and river estuaries.

Randens (French pronunciation: [ʁɑ̃dɑ̃]; Arpitan: Randè) is a former commune in the Savoie department in the Auvergne-Rhône-Alpes region in south-eastern France. On 1 January 2019, it was merged into the new commune Val-d'Arc.

== See also ==
- Communes of the Savoie department
