= Pierre Cot =

French politician (1895–1977)

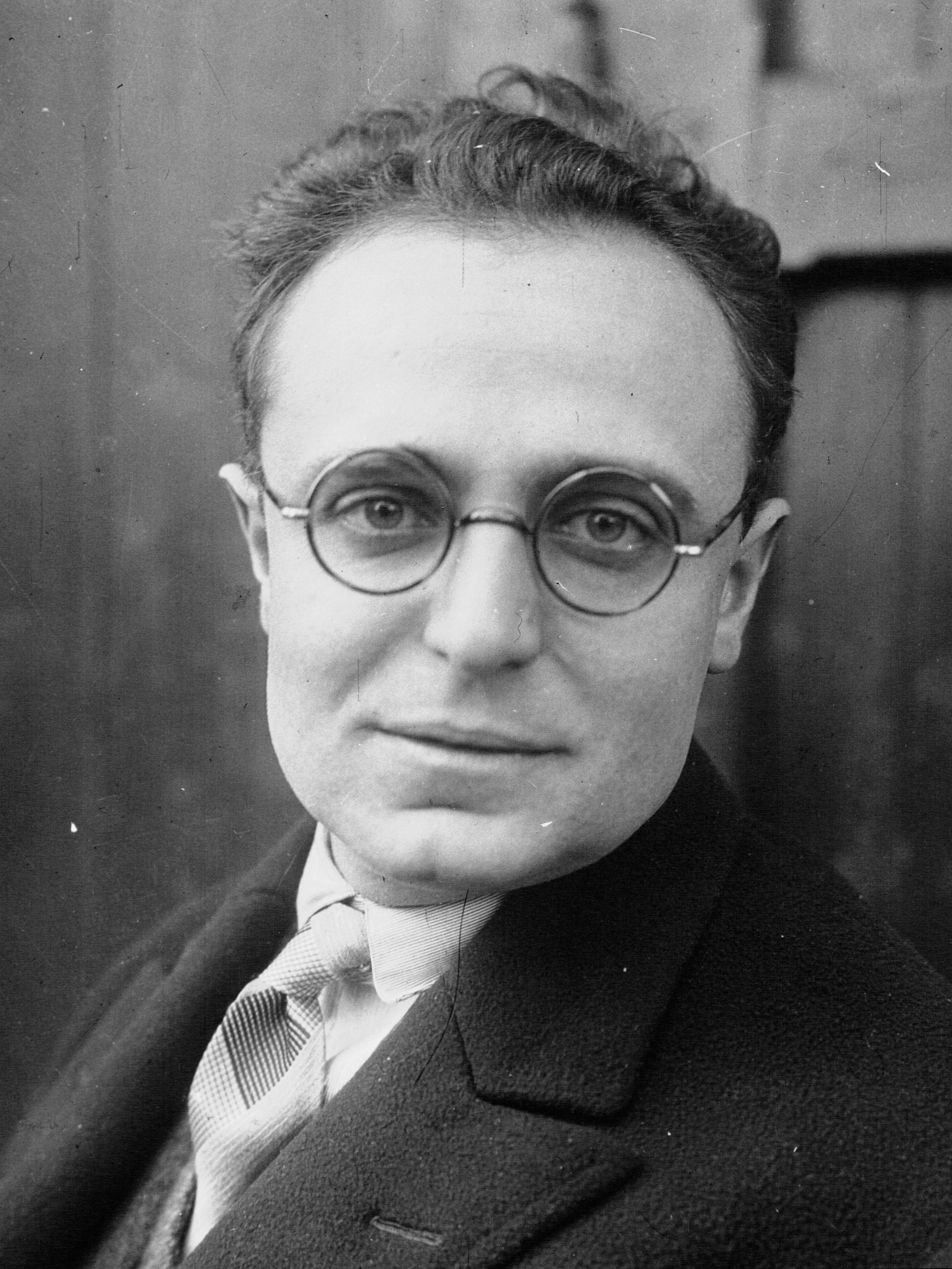
Pierre Cot in 1928

Pierre Jules Cot (French: [pjɛʁ kɔt]; 20 November 1895, in Grenoble – 21 August 1977, Coise-Saint-Jean-Pied-Gauthier), was a French politician and leading figure in the Popular Front government of the 1930s.

Born in Grenoble into a conservative Catholic family, he entered politics as an admirer of the World War I conservative leader Raymond Poincaré, but moved steadily to the left over the course of his career. Through the decrypting of 1943 Soviet intelligence cables through the Venona Project it was established that Cot was an agent of the Soviet Union with the code name of "Dedal". However, other sources suggest that Cot was a communist fellow-traveller rather than an agent. The British Secret Intelligence Service describes him as "a highly controversial figure, vilified at the time by the French Right, and since accused of having been a Soviet agent".

== Biography ==
In the 1920s Cot was a supporter of Aristide Briand, an independent socialist. In 1928 he was elected to the National Assembly as a Radical Deputy for Savoy. In December 1932 he was appointed Under-Secretary for Foreign Affairs in the centre-left government of Joseph Paul-Boncour.

In January 1933, he became Minister for Air in the Radical government of Édouard Daladier. He oversaw the establishment of Air France, and advocated a major expansion of the French Air Force. He was conscious of the real aim of the Nazi policy of creating sailgliding clubs through the Hitlerjugend and supported the expansion of working class aero-clubs movement called Aviation Populaire as a countermeasure, but left office in February 1934 when the Stavisky Affair forced Daladier from power. He was again Minister for Air in three brief governments led by Camille Chautemps.

In 1936, Cot, by this time a socialist, became a leading support of the Popular Front, an alliance of the Radicals and the Socialists led by Léon Blum, with the support of the French Communist Party. An antiwar activist, though not a pacifist, he was president of the International Peace Conference from 1936 to 1940. He received the Stalin Peace Prize in 1953.

When Blum became Prime Minister in June 1936, Cot returned to the Air Ministry. He oversaw the nationalisation of the aeronautical industry and the launch of a re-armament program to meet the challenge of the fast-growing German Luftwaffe.

When the Spanish Civil War broke out, Blum's government reluctantly supported the policy of non-intervention, but Cot became a leading organiser of clandestine aid to the Spanish Republic. He organized a fictitious sale to Hejaz, Finland and Brazil of war planes, that made a flight scale in Spain. The head of his ministerial office, Jean Moulin (later a leader of the French Resistance), made several trips to Spain. This brought Cot into close collaboration with the communists, with whom he had increasingly sympathised since a visit to the Soviet Union in 1933. His activities were one of the factors leading to the withdrawal of the right wing of the Radical Party from the government and Blum's resignation in June 1937. In Blum's second government in March and April 1938, Cot was Minister for Commerce.

When Daladier returned to office and signed the Munich Agreement with Hitler, Cot broke finally with the Radical Party.

In May 1940, Prime Minister Paul Reynaud sent Cot on a mission to buy arms, particularly aircraft, from the Soviet Union, despite the fact that the Hitler-Stalin Pact of August 1939 had in effect made the Soviet Union a German ally. The fall of France the following month rendered his mission pointless. He flew to London and offered his services to Charles de Gaulle's Free French movement, but de Gaulle considered him to be too pro-communist and offered him no position. Cot then went to the United States, where he spent the war years teaching at Yale University.

During this period in the United States operating as a Soviet spy, his controller was Vasiliy Zarubin, the chief NKVD "Rezident" for the United States who operated under the name of Vasiily Zubilin.

Cot was an influential figure among French political exiles, and in 1943 de Gaulle appointed him a member of the provisional French advisory assembly based in Algiers. De Gaulle also sent him to Moscow to negotiate Soviet recognition of the Free French government in exile.

In 1945, Cot was again elected as Deputy for Savoy, styling himself a republican although everyone knew he remained close to the communists. In 1951, he shifted to the Rhône, but when de Gaulle came to power in 1958 he lost his seat. In 1967 he made a final return to politics when he was elected as an independent Deputy for Paris, with the backing of the Communist Party. He was again defeated in the right-wing landslide election of 1968. He died in Paris in 1977.

Cot's son, Jean-Pierre Cot, was a minister in the Socialist government of Pierre Mauroy in 1981–82 and was a member of the European Parliament in 1978–1979 and 1984–1999. Since 2002 he has been a member of the International Tribunal for the Law of the Sea.
