= Randen =

Randen may refer to:

- Randen (mountain range), in Switzerland and Germany
- Randen, a tram line of the Keifuku Electric Railroad in Japan

== See also ==
- Randens
