= Val-d'Arc =

- Commune
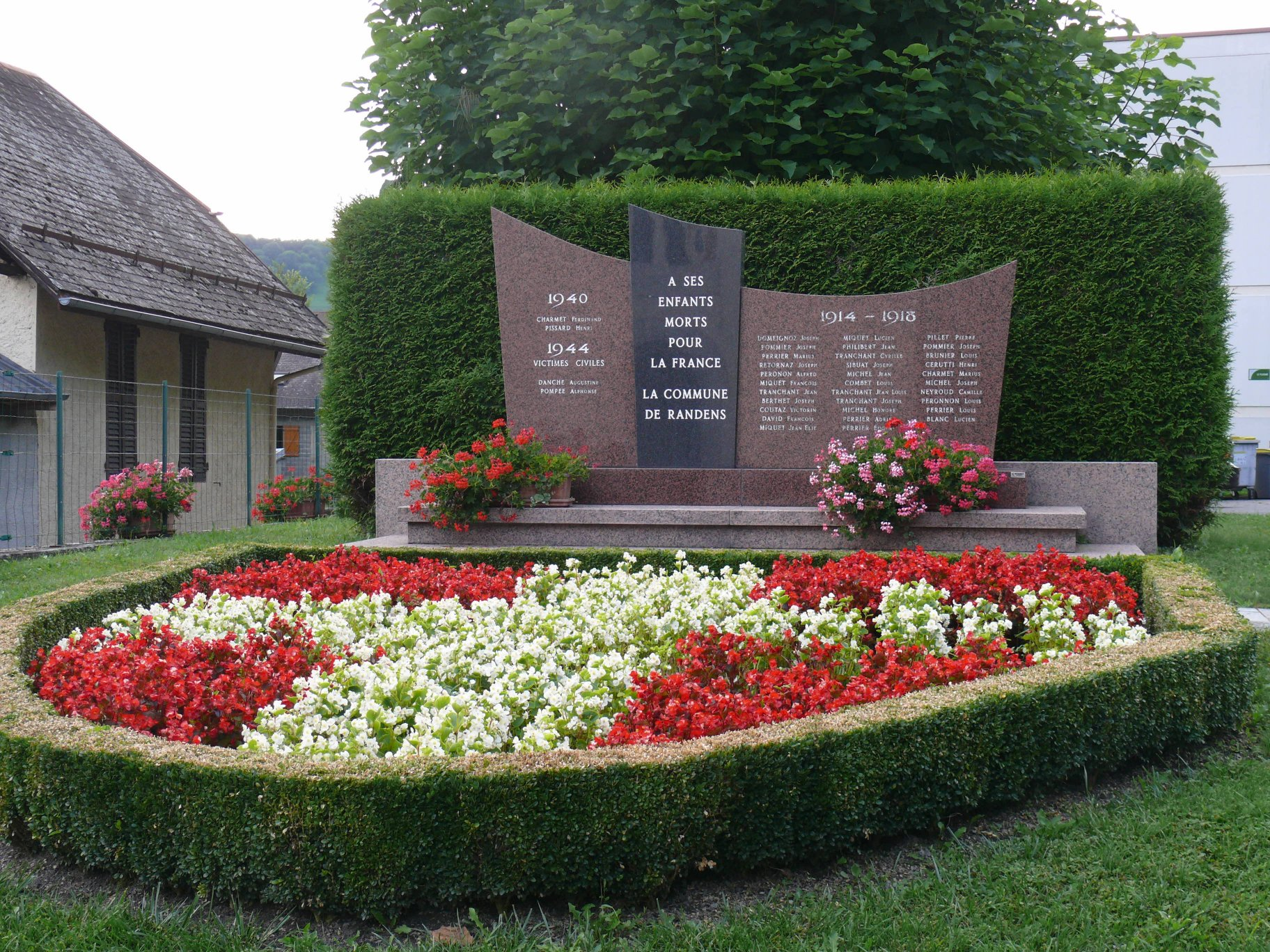
- The war memorial in Randens
- Location of Val-d'Arc
- Location within France Location within Auvergne-Rhône-Alpes
- Coordinates: 45°32′42″N 6°18′39″E
- Country: France
- Region: Auvergne-Rhône-Alpes
- Department: Savoie
- Arrondissement: Saint-Jean-de-Maurienne
- Canton: Saint-Pierre-d'Albigny
- Intercommunality: Porte de Maurienne

Government
  - Mayor (2023–2026): Hervé Genon
- Area^{1}: 14.21 km^{2} (5.49 sq mi)
- Highest elevation: 2,162 m (7,093 ft)
- Lowest elevation: 306 m (1,004 ft)
- Population (2023): 2,026
  - Density: 142.6/km^{2} (369.3/sq mi)
- Time zone: UTC+01:00 (CET)
  - Summer (DST): UTC+02:00 (CEST)
- INSEE/Postal code: 73212 /73220
- ^{1} French Land Register data, which excludes lakes, ponds, glaciers > 1 km^{2} (0.386 sq mi or 247 acres) and river estuaries.

Val-d'Arc (French pronunciation: [val daʁk], literally Vale of Arc) is a commune in the Savoie department in the Auvergne-Rhône-Alpes region in south-eastern France. It was established on 1 January 2019 by merger of the former communes of Randens (the seat) and Aiguebelle.

== Population ==
Population data refer to the area corresponding with the commune as of January 2025.

Historical population
Year	Pop.	±% p.a.
1968	1,779	—
1975	1,715	−0.52%
1982	1,700	−0.13%
1990	1,483	−1.69%
1999	1,564	+0.59%
2007	1,894	+2.42%
2012	1,984	+0.93%
2017	2,008	+0.24%
2023	2,026	+0.15%
Source: INSEE

== See also ==
- Communes of the Savoie department
