= Champ-Laurent =

Champ-Laurent Shanlorè (Savoyard)
- Commune
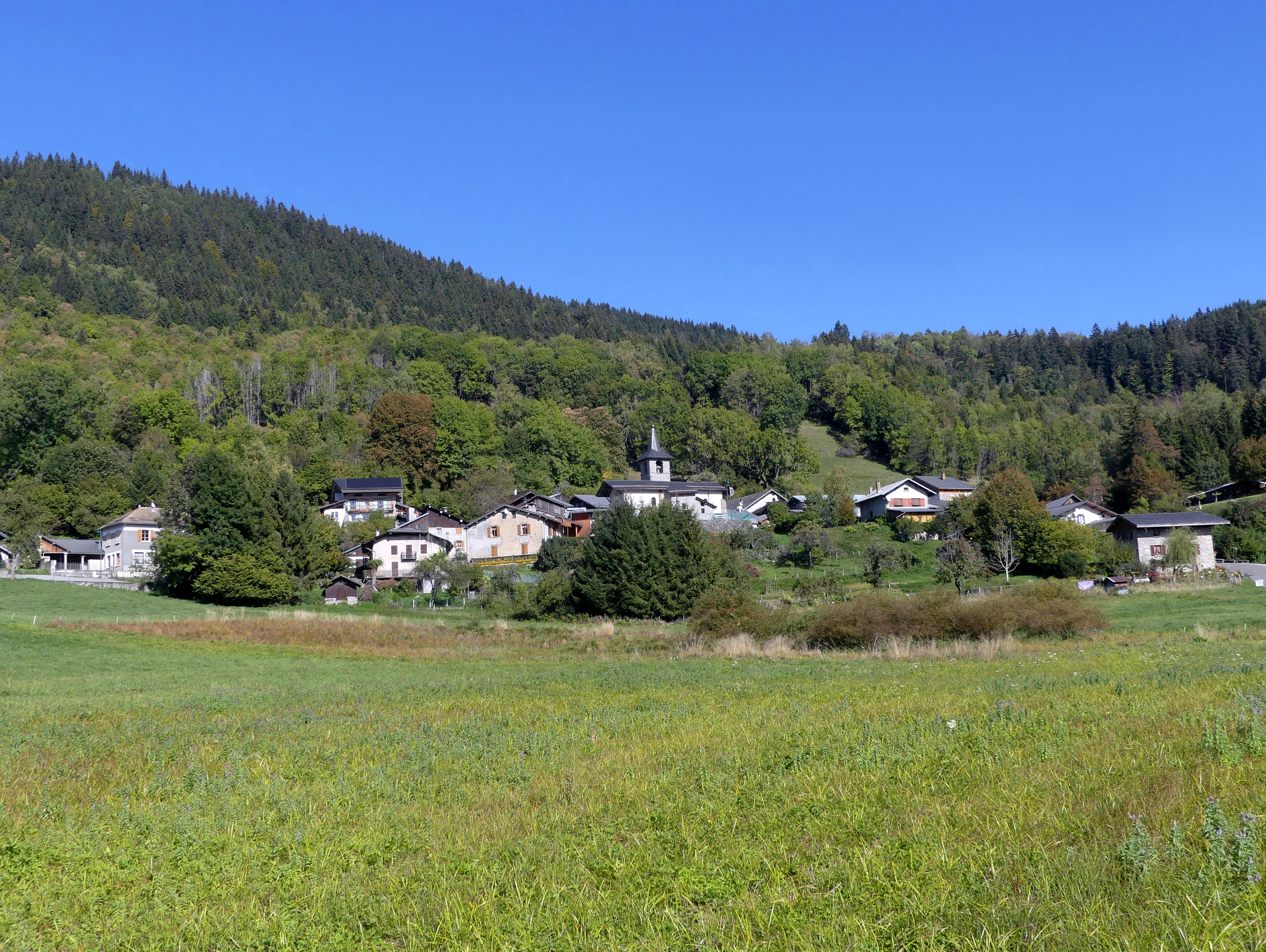
- Location of Champ-Laurent
- Location within France Location within Auvergne-Rhône-Alpes
- Coordinates: 45°30′34″N 6°12′46″E
- Country: France
- Region: Auvergne-Rhône-Alpes
- Department: Savoie
- Arrondissement: Chambéry
- Canton: Saint-Pierre-d'Albigny

Government
  - Mayor (2020–2026): Eric Barbier
- Area^{1}: 5.07 km^{2} (1.96 sq mi)
- Highest elevation: 1,337 m (4,386 ft)
- Lowest elevation: 520 m (1,710 ft)
- Population (2023): 31
  - Density: 6.1/km^{2} (16/sq mi)
- Demonym(s): Laurentaines, Laurentains
- Time zone: UTC+01:00 (CET)
  - Summer (DST): UTC+02:00 (CEST)
- INSEE/Postal code: 73072 /73390
- ^{1} French Land Register data, which excludes lakes, ponds, glaciers > 1 km^{2} (0.386 sq mi or 247 acres) and river estuaries.

Champ-Laurent (French pronunciation: [ʃɑ̃ loʁɑ̃]; Savoyard: Shanlorè) is a commune in the Savoie department in the Auvergne-Rhône-Alpes region in south-eastern France.

== See also ==
- Communes of the Savoie department
