= Châteauneuf, Savoie =

Châteauneuf
- Commune
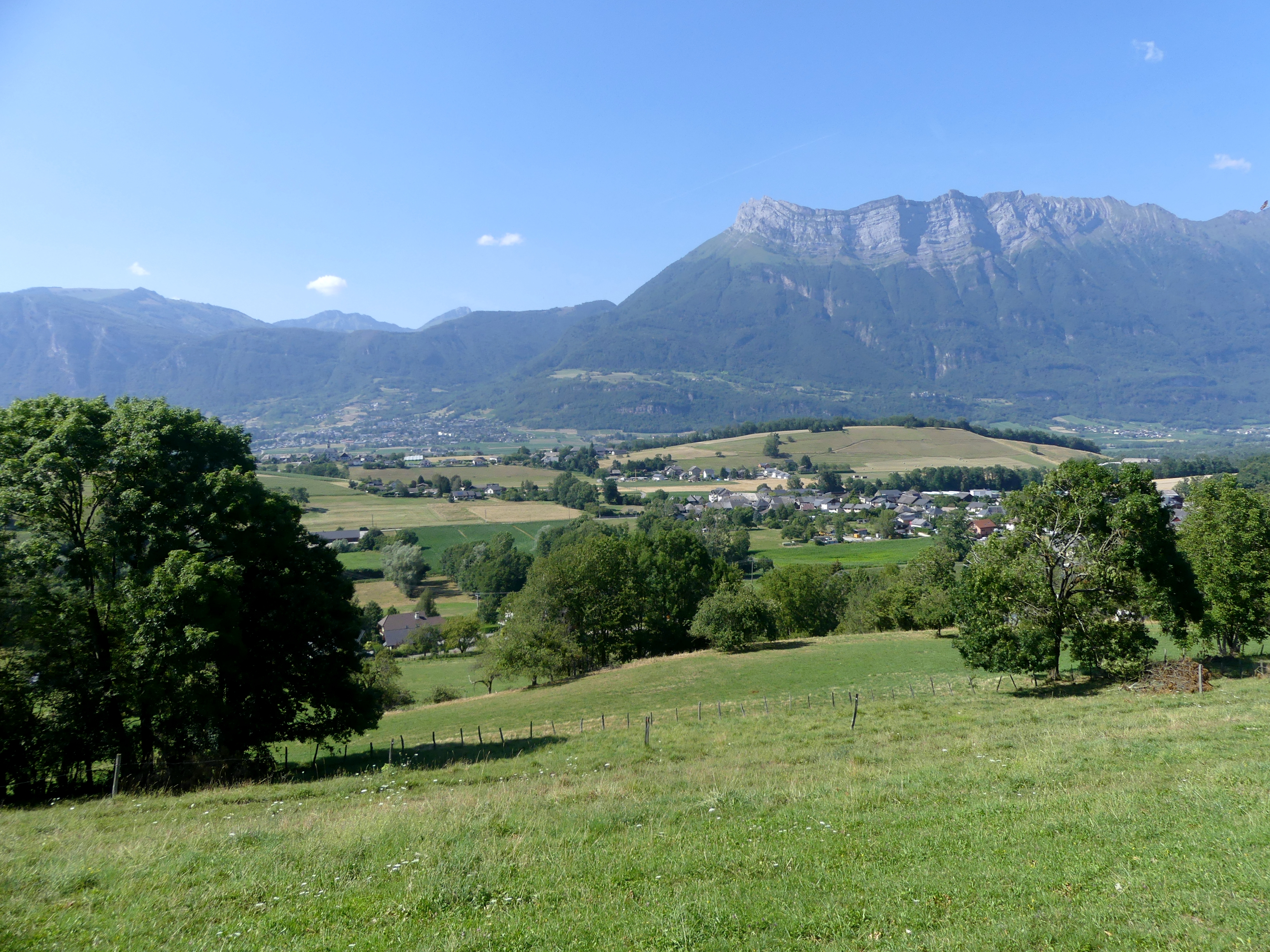
- A general view of Châteauneuf

- Coat of arms
- Location of Châteauneuf
- Location within France Location within Auvergne-Rhône-Alpes
- Coordinates: 45°32′43″N 6°10′55″E
- Country: France
- Region: Auvergne-Rhône-Alpes
- Department: Savoie
- Arrondissement: Chambéry
- Canton: Saint-Pierre-d'Albigny

Government
  - Mayor (2020–2026): Christelle Hugonot
- Area^{1}: 6.99 km^{2} (2.70 sq mi)
- Highest elevation: 429 m (1,407 ft)
- Lowest elevation: 277 m (909 ft)
- Population (2023): 901
  - Density: 129/km^{2} (334/sq mi)
- Time zone: UTC+01:00 (CET)
  - Summer (DST): UTC+02:00 (CEST)
- INSEE/Postal code: 73079 /73390
- ^{1} French Land Register data, which excludes lakes, ponds, glaciers > 1 km^{2} (0.386 sq mi or 247 acres) and river estuaries.

Châteauneuf (French pronunciation: [ʃɑtonœf]) is a commune in the Savoie department in the Auvergne-Rhône-Alpes region in south-eastern France.

== See also ==
- Communes of the Savoie department
