= La Giettaz =

La Giettaz La Zyèta (Arpitan)
- Commune
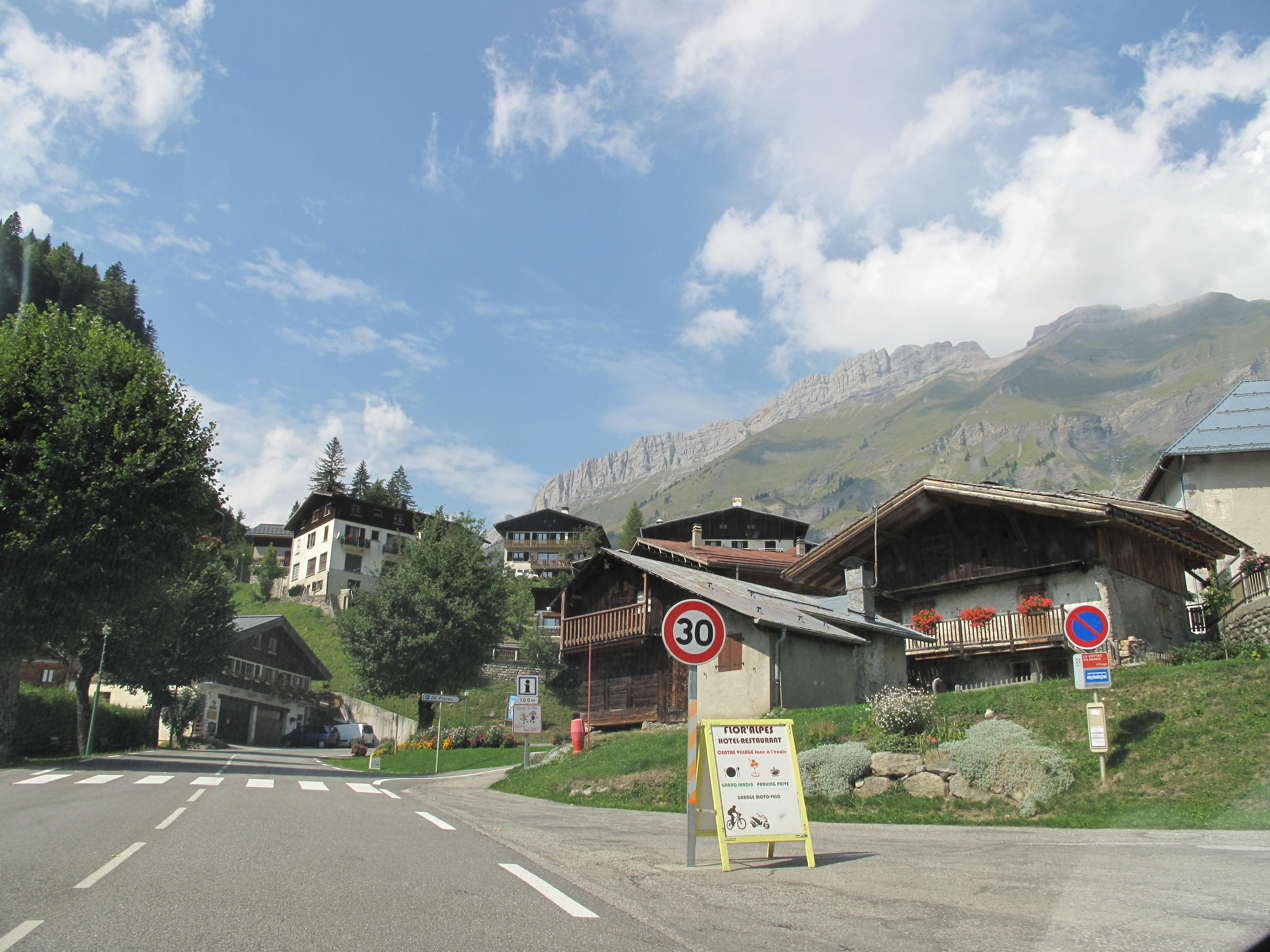
- Road to the Col des Aravis at La Giettaz
- Location of La Giettaz
- Location within France Location within Auvergne-Rhône-Alpes
- Coordinates: 45°51′47″N 6°29′45″E
- Country: France
- Region: Auvergne-Rhône-Alpes
- Department: Savoie
- Arrondissement: Albertville
- Canton: Ugine
- Intercommunality: CA Arlysère

Government
  - Mayor (2020–2026): Daniel Danglard
- Area^{1}: 35.2 km^{2} (13.6 sq mi)
- Highest elevation: 2,611 m (8,566 ft)
- Lowest elevation: 1,002 m (3,287 ft)
- Population (2023): 381
  - Density: 10.8/km^{2} (28.0/sq mi)
- Time zone: UTC+01:00 (CET)
  - Summer (DST): UTC+02:00 (CEST)
- INSEE/Postal code: 73123 /73590
- ^{1} French Land Register data, which excludes lakes, ponds, glaciers > 1 km^{2} (0.386 sq mi or 247 acres) and river estuaries.

La Giettaz (Arpitan: La Zyèta) is a commune in the Savoie department in the Auvergne-Rhône-Alpes region in south-eastern France.

== Toponymy ==
As with many polysyllabic Arpitan toponyms or anthroponyms, the final -x marks oxytonic stress (on the last syllable), whereas the final -z indicates paroxytonic stress (on the penultimate syllable) and should not be pronounced, although in French it is often mispronounced due to hypercorrection.

== See also ==
- Communes of the Savoie department
