= Saint-Jean-de-la-Porte =

Saint-Jean-de-la-Porte San Djan (Savoyard)
- Commune
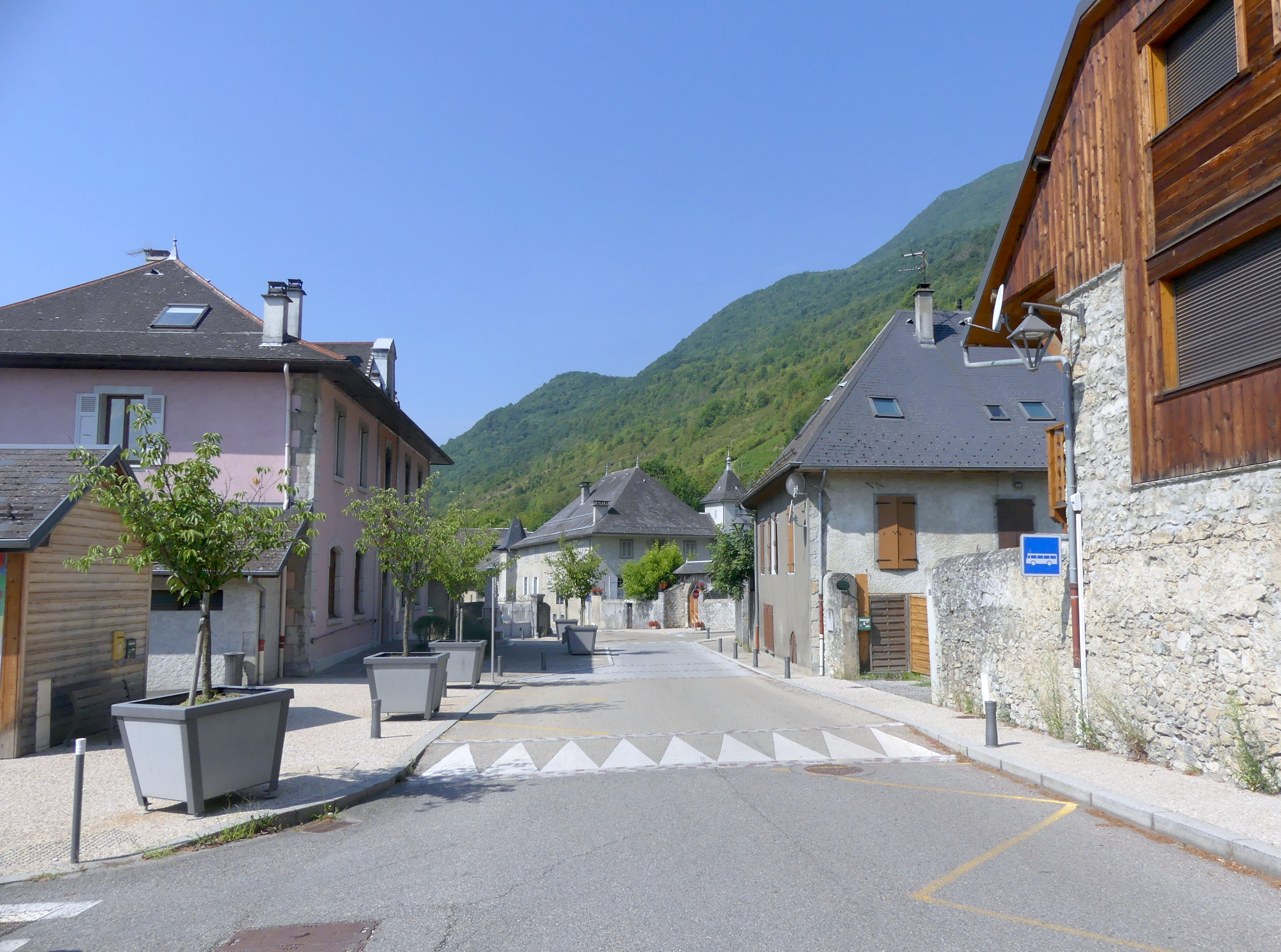
- Location of Saint-Jean-de-la-Porte
- Location within France Location within Auvergne-Rhône-Alpes
- Coordinates: 45°33′27″N 6°07′44″E
- Country: France
- Region: Auvergne-Rhône-Alpes
- Department: Savoie
- Arrondissement: Chambéry
- Canton: Saint-Pierre-d'Albigny
- Intercommunality: Cœur de Savoie

Government
  - Mayor (2020–2026): Alain Combaz
- Area^{1}: 16.01 km^{2} (6.18 sq mi)
- Highest elevation: 1,569 m (5,148 ft)
- Lowest elevation: 273 m (896 ft)
- Population (2023): 989
  - Density: 61.8/km^{2} (160/sq mi)
- Time zone: UTC+01:00 (CET)
  - Summer (DST): UTC+02:00 (CEST)
- INSEE/Postal code: 73247 /73250
- Website: www.saintjeandelaporte.fr
- ^{1} French Land Register data, which excludes lakes, ponds, glaciers > 1 km^{2} (0.386 sq mi or 247 acres) and river estuaries.

Saint-Jean-de-la-Porte (French pronunciation: [sɛ̃ ʒɑ̃ də la pɔʁt]; Savoyard: San Djan) is a commune in the Savoie department in the Auvergne-Rhône-Alpes region of Southeastern France. As of 2023, the population of the commune was 989.

== See also ==
- Communes of the Savoie department
