= Saint-Martin-d'Arc =

- Commune
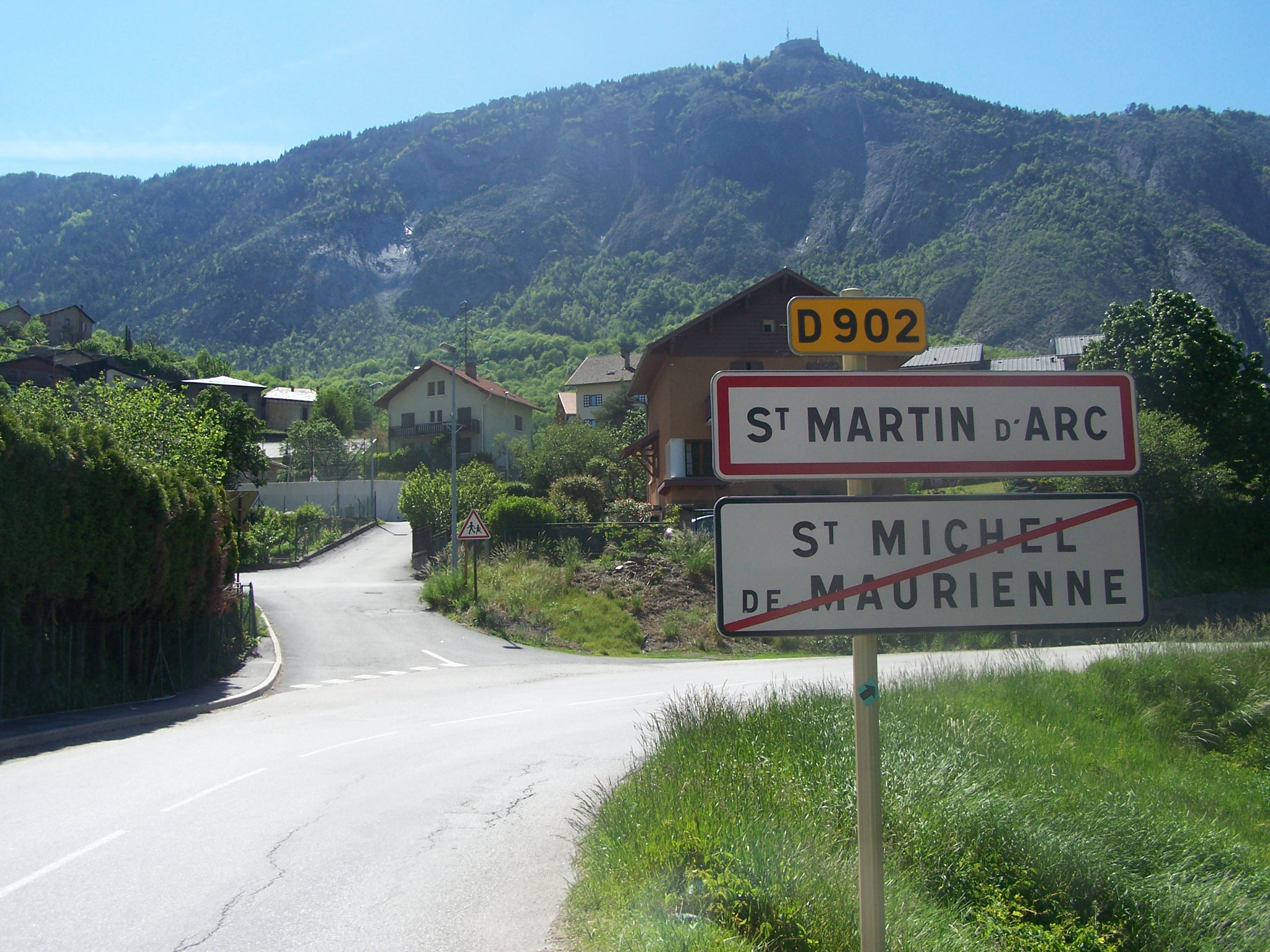
- The road into Saint-Martin-d'Arc
- Location of Saint-Martin-d'Arc
- Location within France Location within Auvergne-Rhône-Alpes
- Coordinates: 45°12′48″N 6°28′07″E
- Country: France
- Region: Auvergne-Rhône-Alpes
- Department: Savoie
- Arrondissement: Saint-Jean-de-Maurienne
- Canton: Modane
- Intercommunality: Maurienne-Galibier

Government
  - Mayor (2020–2026): Luc Ollier
- Area^{1}: 4.93 km^{2} (1.90 sq mi)
- Highest elevation: 1,560 m (5,120 ft)
- Lowest elevation: 695 m (2,280 ft)
- Population (2023): 298
  - Density: 60.4/km^{2} (157/sq mi)
- Time zone: UTC+01:00 (CET)
  - Summer (DST): UTC+02:00 (CEST)
- INSEE/Postal code: 73256 /73140
- ^{1} French Land Register data, which excludes lakes, ponds, glaciers > 1 km^{2} (0.386 sq mi or 247 acres) and river estuaries.

Saint-Martin-d'Arc is a commune in the Savoie department in the Auvergne-Rhône-Alpes region in south-eastern France.

== See also ==
- Communes of the Savoie department
