= Betton-Bettonet =

Betton-Bettonet Le Betne (Savoyard)
- Commune
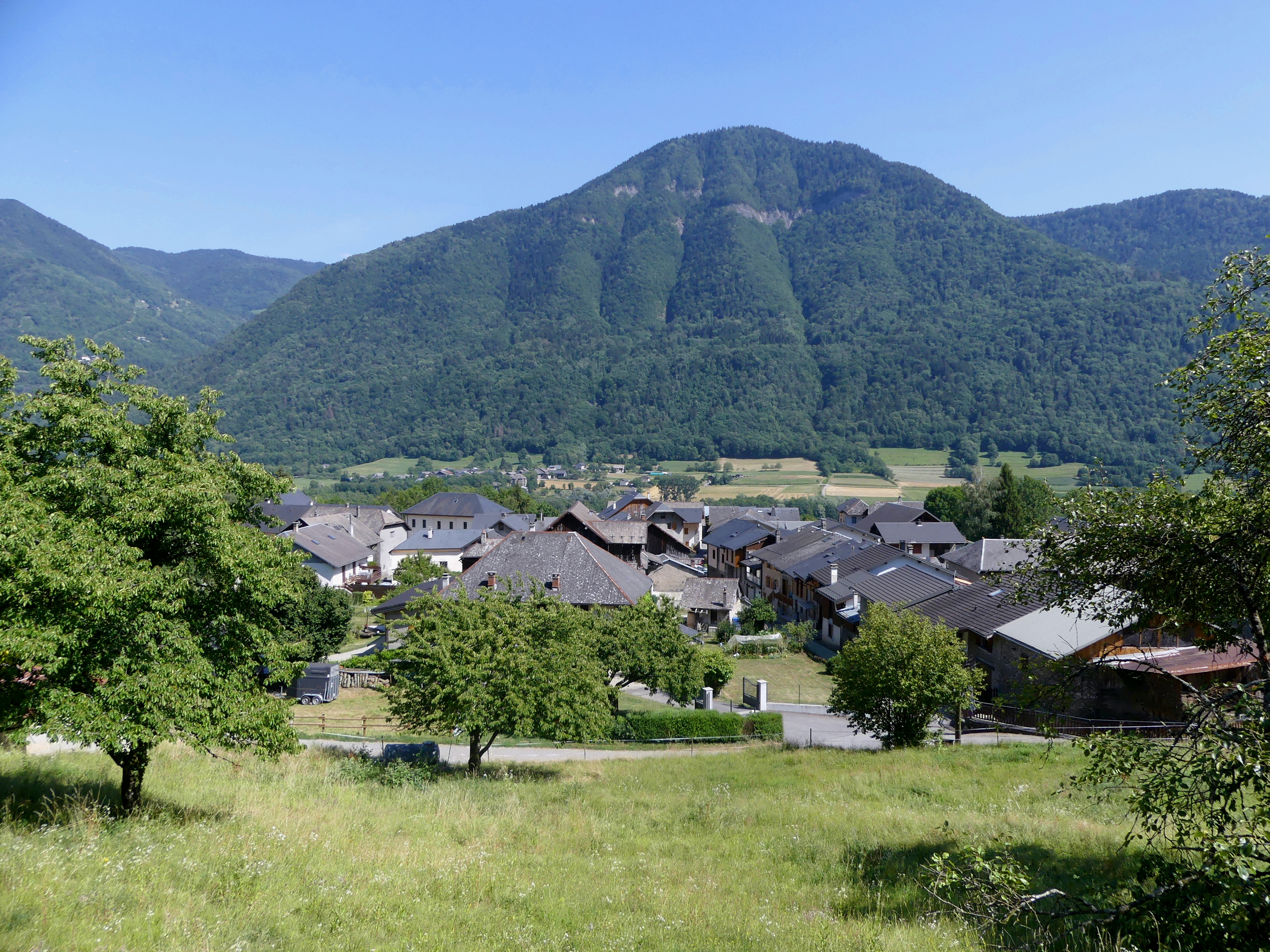
- Location of Betton-Bettonet
- Location within France Location within Auvergne-Rhône-Alpes
- Coordinates: 45°31′52″N 6°11′18″E
- Country: France
- Region: Auvergne-Rhône-Alpes
- Department: Savoie
- Arrondissement: Chambéry
- Canton: Saint-Pierre-d'Albigny
- Intercommunality: Cœur de Savoie

Government
  - Mayor (2020–2026): Jérôme Berthier
- Area^{1}: 3.41 km^{2} (1.32 sq mi)
- Highest elevation: 571 m (1,873 ft)
- Lowest elevation: 287 m (942 ft)
- Population (2023): 306
  - Density: 89.7/km^{2} (232/sq mi)
- Time zone: UTC+01:00 (CET)
  - Summer (DST): UTC+02:00 (CEST)
- INSEE/Postal code: 73041 /73390
- ^{1} French Land Register data, which excludes lakes, ponds, glaciers > 1 km^{2} (0.386 sq mi or 247 acres) and river estuaries.

Betton-Bettonet (Arpitan: Le Betne) is a commune in the Savoie department in the Auvergne-Rhône-Alpes region in south-eastern France.

== Geography ==
=== Climate ===
According to a 2010 study by the French National Centre for Scientific Research, the commune is situated in a "mountain margins climate". In 2020, Météo-France published its own typology of French climates in which it categorized the commune's climate as a mountain climate or mountain margins climate within the Northern Alps climate region.

From 1971 to 2000, the average annual temperature was 11.3 °C (52.3 °F), with an annual range of 18.8 °C (65.8 °F). The average annual rainfall was 1,364 millimetres (53.7 in), with 9.9 days of rainfall in January and 8.5 days of rainfall in July.

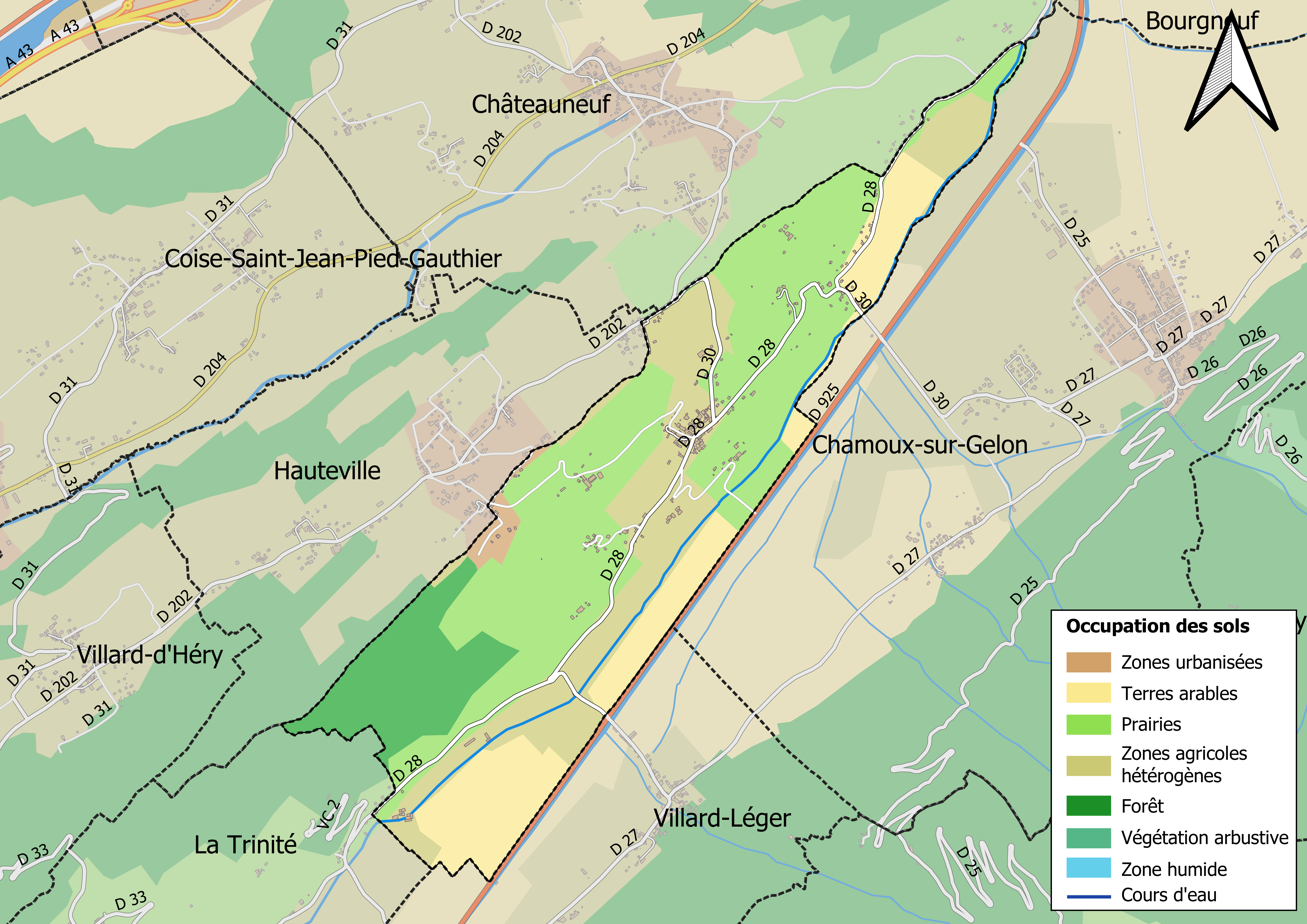
Map of the commune's infrastructure and land use in 2018

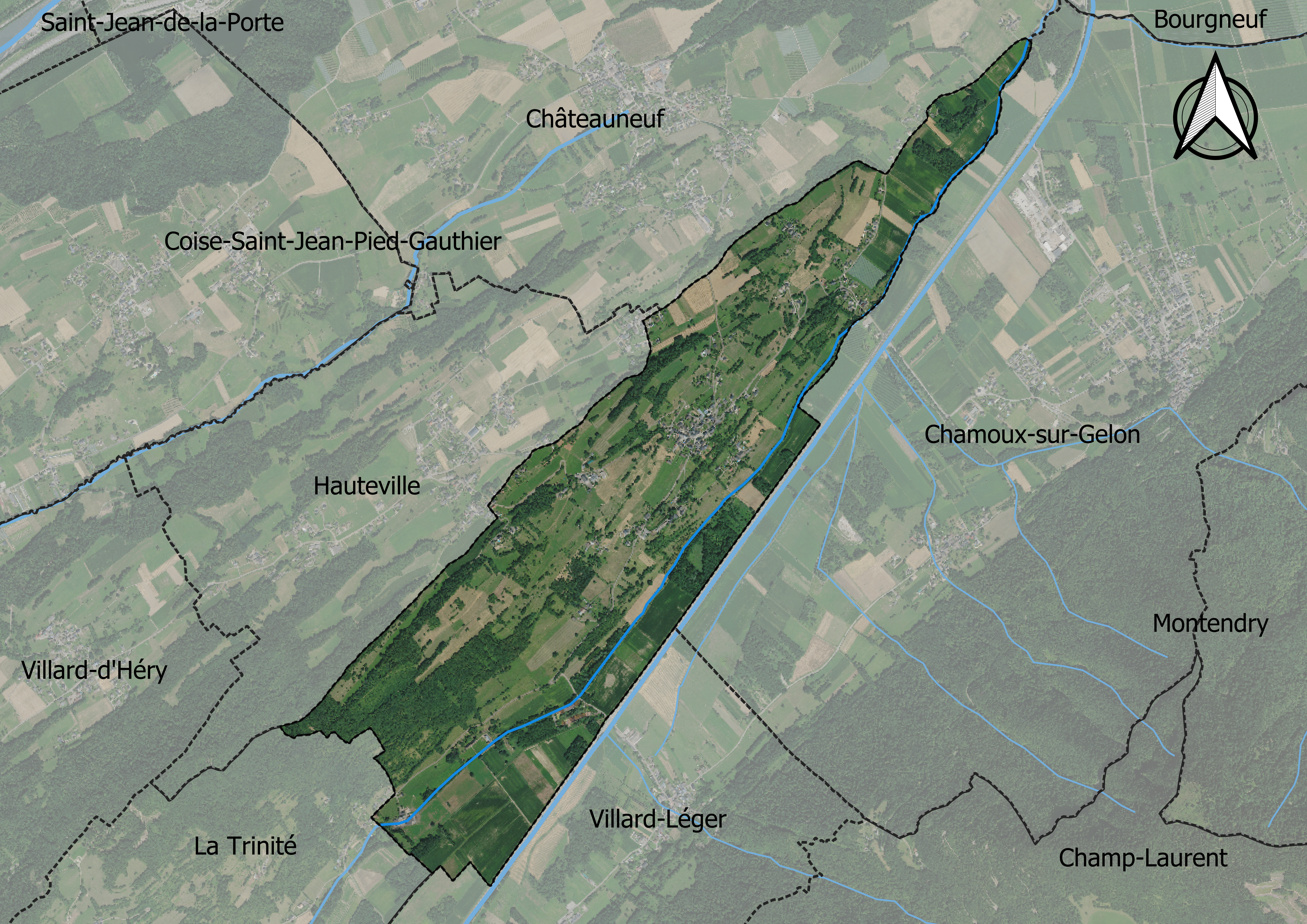
Satellite image of the commune

== See also ==
- Communes of the Savoie department
