= Hauteville, Savoie =

Hauteville
- Commune
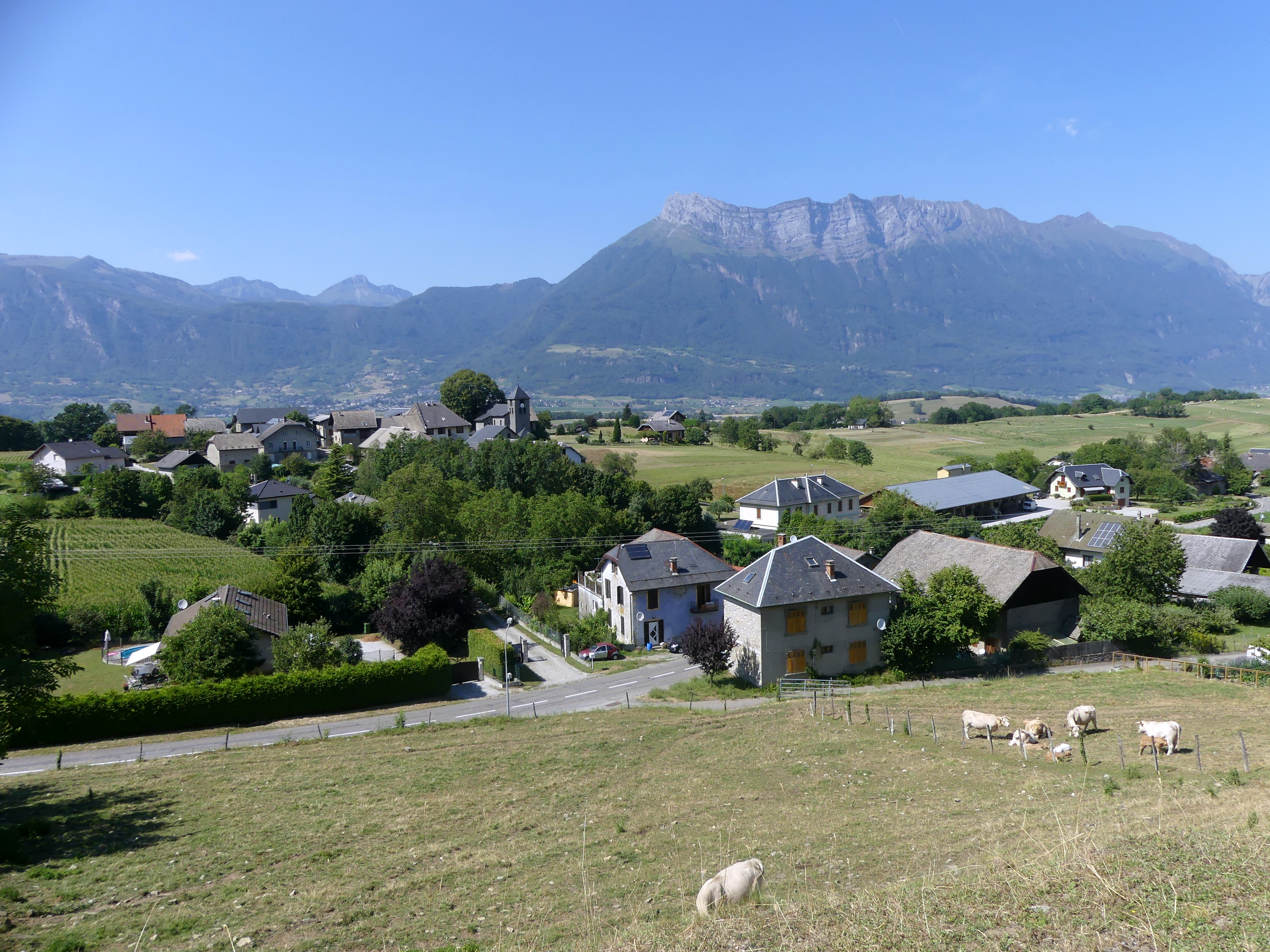
- A general view of Hauteville

- Coat of arms
- Location of Hauteville
- Location within France Location within Auvergne-Rhône-Alpes
- Coordinates: 45°31′50″N 6°10′24″E
- Country: France
- Region: Auvergne-Rhône-Alpes
- Department: Savoie
- Arrondissement: Chambéry
- Canton: Saint-Pierre-d'Albigny

Government
  - Mayor (2020–2026): Marc Girard
- Area^{1}: 2.45 km^{2} (0.95 sq mi)
- Highest elevation: 640 m (2,100 ft)
- Lowest elevation: 300 m (980 ft)
- Population (2023): 350
  - Density: 140/km^{2} (370/sq mi)
- Time zone: UTC+01:00 (CET)
  - Summer (DST): UTC+02:00 (CEST)
- INSEE/Postal code: 73133 /73390
- ^{1} French Land Register data, which excludes lakes, ponds, glaciers > 1 km^{2} (0.386 sq mi or 247 acres) and river estuaries.

Hauteville (French pronunciation: [otvil]) is a commune in the Savoie department in the Auvergne-Rhône-Alpes region in south-eastern France.

== See also ==
- Communes of the Savoie department
