= Cruet, Savoie =

Cruet
- Commune
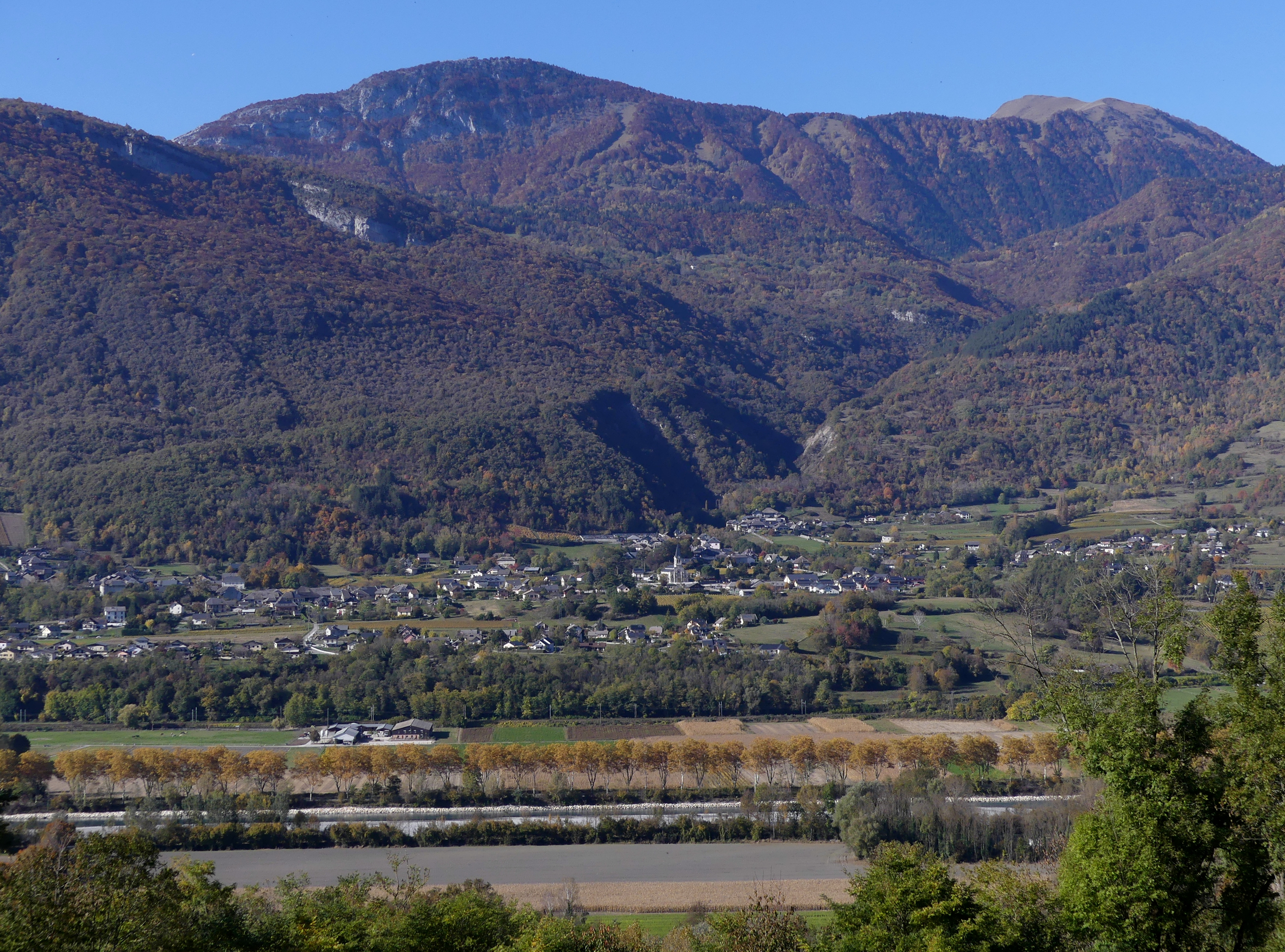
- Location of Cruet
- Location within France Location within Auvergne-Rhône-Alpes
- Coordinates: 45°31′44″N 6°05′32″E
- Country: France
- Region: Auvergne-Rhône-Alpes
- Department: Savoie
- Arrondissement: Chambéry
- Canton: Saint-Pierre-d'Albigny

Government
  - Mayor (2020–2026): Jean-Michel Blondet
- Area^{1}: 10.06 km^{2} (3.88 sq mi)
- Highest elevation: 1,456 m (4,777 ft)
- Lowest elevation: 272 m (892 ft)
- Population (2023): 1,056
  - Density: 105.0/km^{2} (271.9/sq mi)
- Time zone: UTC+01:00 (CET)
  - Summer (DST): UTC+02:00 (CEST)
- INSEE/Postal code: 73096 /73800
- Website: www.cruet.fr
- ^{1} French Land Register data, which excludes lakes, ponds, glaciers > 1 km^{2} (0.386 sq mi or 247 acres) and river estuaries.

Cruet is a commune in the Savoie department in the Auvergne-Rhône-Alpes region in south-eastern France.

== See also ==
- Communes of the Savoie department
