= Montendry =

Montendry Montédri (Savoyard)
- Commune
- Location of Montendry
- Location within France Location within Auvergne-Rhône-Alpes
- Coordinates: 45°31′35″N 6°14′30″E
- Country: France
- Region: Auvergne-Rhône-Alpes
- Department: Savoie
- Arrondissement: Chambéry
- Canton: Saint-Pierre-d'Albigny

Government
  - Mayor (2020–2026): Jacqueline Schenkl
- Area^{1}: 8.28 km^{2} (3.20 sq mi)
- Highest elevation: 1,400 m (4,600 ft)
- Lowest elevation: 400 m (1,300 ft)
- Population (2023): 49
  - Density: 5.9/km^{2} (15/sq mi)
- Time zone: UTC+01:00 (CET)
  - Summer (DST): UTC+02:00 (CEST)
- INSEE/Postal code: 73166 /73390
- ^{1} French Land Register data, which excludes lakes, ponds, glaciers > 1 km^{2} (0.386 sq mi or 247 acres) and river estuaries.

Montendry (French pronunciation: [mɔ̃tɑ̃dʁi]; Savoyard: Montédri) is a commune in the Savoie department in the Auvergne-Rhône-Alpes region in south-eastern France.

== See also ==
- Communes of the Savoie department
