= Jean-Pierre Cot =

French politician and jurist (born 1937)

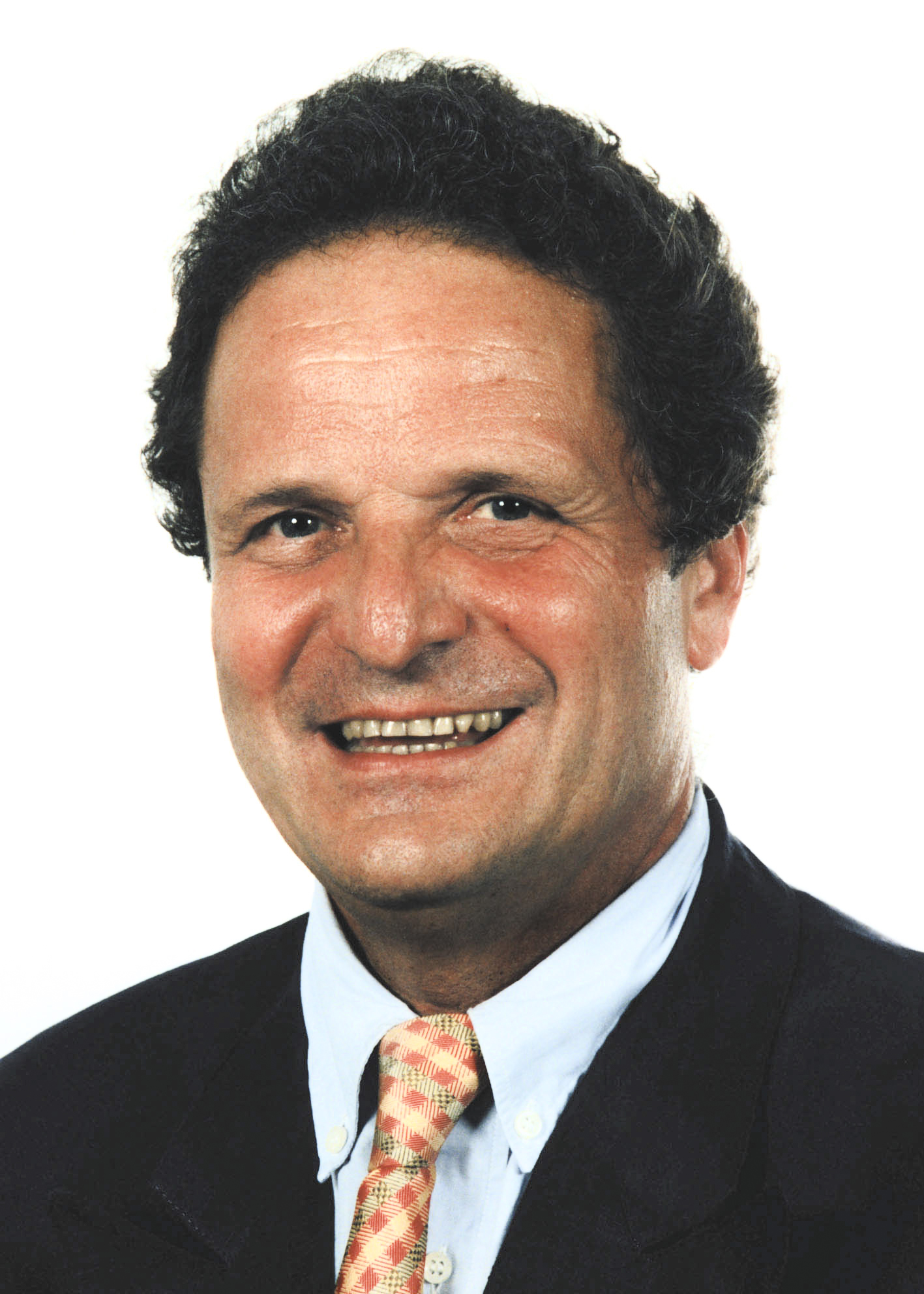
- Cot in 1994

Member of the European Parliament for France
- In office 1984 – 20 July 1999
- In office 1978–1979

Personal details
- Born: 23 October 1937 (age 89) Chêne-Bougeries, Geneva, Switzerland
- Party: Socialist Party
- Parent: Pierre Cot
- Education: University of Paris

Jean-Pierre Cot (French: [ʒɑ̃ pjɛʁ kɔt]; born 23 October 1937) is a French politician and jurist who served as a Member of the European Parliament from 1978 to 1979 and from 1984 to 1999. Since 2002, he has been a judge for the International Tribunal for the Law of the Sea.

== Biography ==
He is the son of Pierre Cot, also a politician and minister.

After studying law at Sorbonne University in Paris from 1955 to 1965, he earned a Ph.D. in 1966. He then was professor of public law and international law at the University of Amiens, then the University of Paris I, before being elected as a deputy for Savoie in 1973. He was later re-elected, before joining the Socialist government of Pierre Mauroy in 1981 as deputy minister in charge of Co-operation and Development.

He was a Member of European Parliament (MEP) in 1978–1979 and 1984–1999, and chaired the socialist group of the European Parliament between 1989 and 1994, before becoming its vice-president in 1997.

Since 2002, he has been a member of the International Tribunal for the Law of the Sea.

In 2017, he was made an officer of the Legion of Honour.
