= Saint-Pierre-de-Belleville =

- Commune
- Location of Saint-Pierre-de-Belleville
- Location within France Location within Auvergne-Rhône-Alpes
- Coordinates: 45°28′17″N 6°16′56″E
- Country: France
- Region: Auvergne-Rhône-Alpes
- Department: Savoie
- Arrondissement: Saint-Jean-de-Maurienne
- Canton: Saint-Pierre-d'Albigny
- Intercommunality: Porte de Maurienne

Government
  - Mayor (2020–2026): Christine Bouclier-Beauchet
- Area^{1}: 7.46 km^{2} (2.88 sq mi)
- Highest elevation: 2,335 m (7,661 ft)
- Lowest elevation: 348 m (1,142 ft)
- Population (2023): 184
  - Density: 24.7/km^{2} (63.9/sq mi)
- Time zone: UTC+01:00 (CET)
  - Summer (DST): UTC+02:00 (CEST)
- INSEE/Postal code: 73272 /73220
- ^{1} French Land Register data, which excludes lakes, ponds, glaciers > 1 km^{2} (0.386 sq mi or 247 acres) and river estuaries.

Saint-Pierre-de-Belleville (French pronunciation: [sɛ̃ pjɛʁ də bɛlvil]; Arpitan: Sent-Pierro-de-Bèlavela) is a commune in the Savoie department in the Auvergne-Rhône-Alpes region in south-eastern France.

== See also ==
- Communes of the Savoie department
