= Saint-Léger, Savoie =

Saint-Léger Sin Lazé (Savoyard)
- Commune
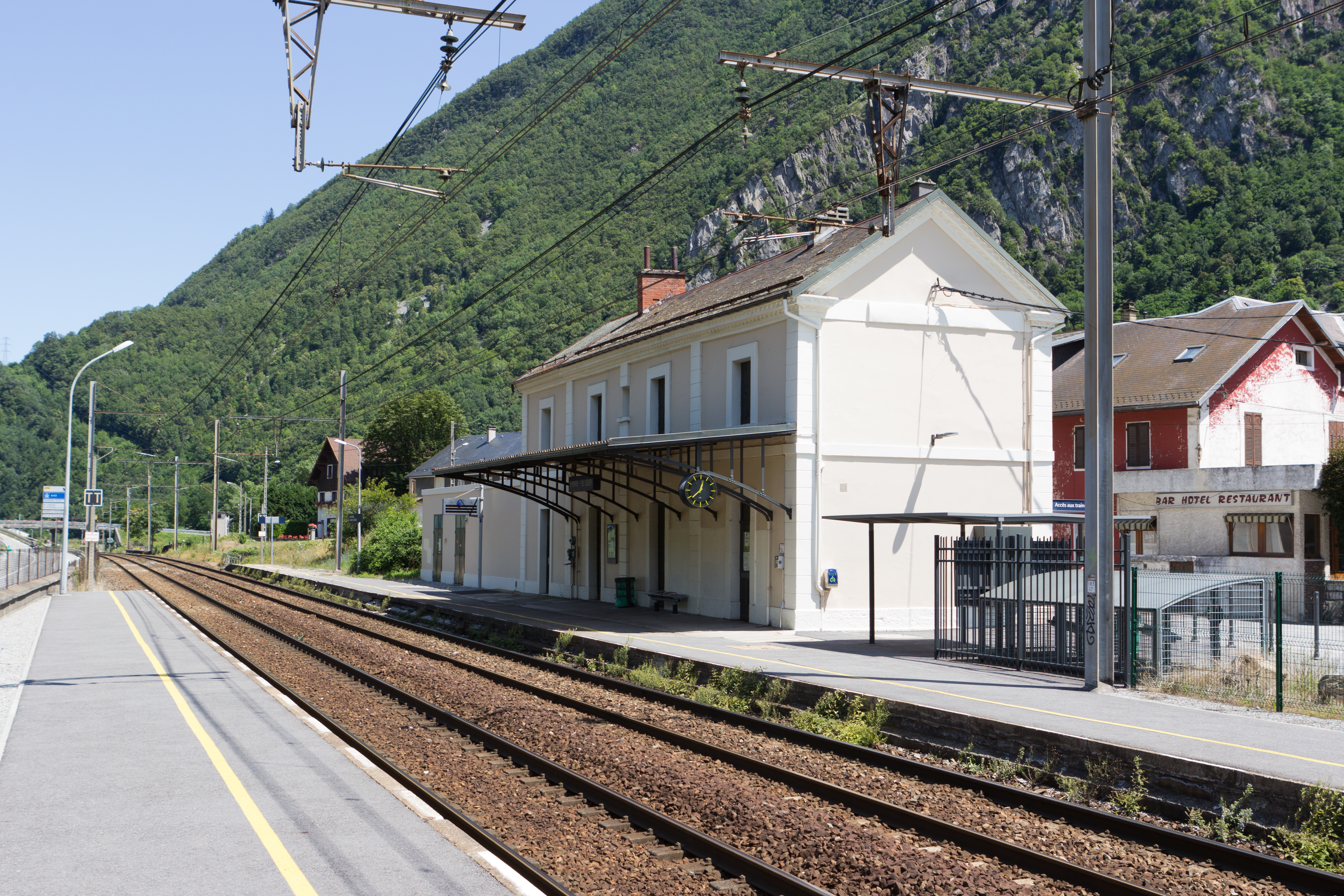
- The railway station in Saint-Léger

- Coat of arms
- Location of Saint-Léger
- Location within France Location within Auvergne-Rhône-Alpes
- Coordinates: 45°26′13″N 6°16′38″E
- Country: France
- Region: Auvergne-Rhône-Alpes
- Department: Savoie
- Arrondissement: Saint-Jean-de-Maurienne
- Canton: Saint-Pierre-d'Albigny
- Intercommunality: Porte de Maurienne

Government
  - Mayor (2020–2026): Mickaël Cohin
- Area^{1}: 11.06 km^{2} (4.27 sq mi)
- Highest elevation: 2,200 m (7,200 ft)
- Lowest elevation: 352 m (1,155 ft)
- Population (2023): 257
  - Density: 23.2/km^{2} (60.2/sq mi)
- Time zone: UTC+01:00 (CET)
  - Summer (DST): UTC+02:00 (CEST)
- INSEE/Postal code: 73252 /73220
- ^{1} French Land Register data, which excludes lakes, ponds, glaciers > 1 km^{2} (0.386 sq mi or 247 acres) and river estuaries.

Saint-Léger (French pronunciation: [sɛ̃ leʒe]; Savoyard: Sin Lazé) is a commune in the Savoie department in the Auvergne-Rhône-Alpes region in south-eastern France.

== See also ==
- Communes of the Savoie department
