= Montgilbert =

Montgilbert Monzhereû (Savoyard)
- Commune
- Location of Montgilbert
- Location within France Location within Auvergne-Rhône-Alpes
- Coordinates: 45°33′02″N 6°17′07″E
- Country: France
- Region: Auvergne-Rhône-Alpes
- Department: Savoie
- Arrondissement: Saint-Jean-de-Maurienne
- Canton: Saint-Pierre-d'Albigny
- Intercommunality: Porte de Maurienne

Government
  - Mayor (2020–2026): Jean-Paul Buet
- Area^{1}: 9.53 km^{2} (3.68 sq mi)
- Highest elevation: 1,470 m (4,820 ft)
- Lowest elevation: 318 m (1,043 ft)
- Population (2023): 114
  - Density: 12.0/km^{2} (31.0/sq mi)
- Time zone: UTC+01:00 (CET)
  - Summer (DST): UTC+02:00 (CEST)
- INSEE/Postal code: 73168 /73220
- ^{1} French Land Register data, which excludes lakes, ponds, glaciers > 1 km^{2} (0.386 sq mi or 247 acres) and river estuaries.

Montgilbert (French pronunciation: [mɔ̃ʒilbɛʁ]; Savoyard: Monzhereû) is a commune in the Savoie department in the Auvergne-Rhône-Alpes region in south-eastern France.

== See also ==
- Communes of the Savoie department
