= Fréterive =

- Commune
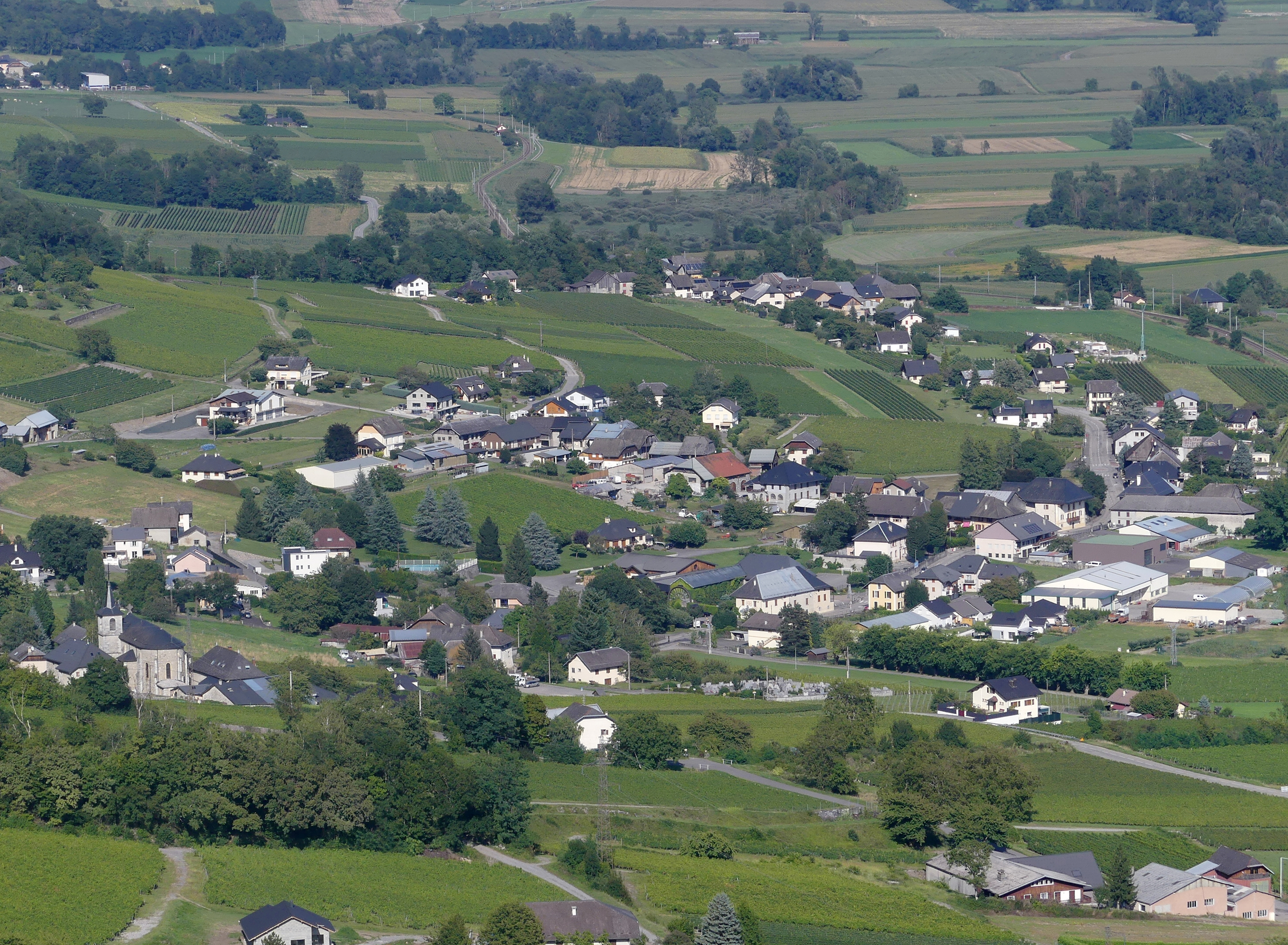
- Location of Fréterive
- Location within France Location within Auvergne-Rhône-Alpes
- Coordinates: 45°35′07″N 6°12′39″E
- Country: France
- Region: Auvergne-Rhône-Alpes
- Department: Savoie
- Arrondissement: Chambéry
- Canton: Saint-Pierre-d'Albigny

Government
  - Mayor (2020–2026): Ève Buevoz
- Area^{1}: 11.01 km^{2} (4.25 sq mi)
- Highest elevation: 2,051 m (6,729 ft)
- Lowest elevation: 285 m (935 ft)
- Population (2023): 640
  - Density: 58/km^{2} (150/sq mi)
- Time zone: UTC+01:00 (CET)
  - Summer (DST): UTC+02:00 (CEST)
- INSEE/Postal code: 73120 /73250
- ^{1} French Land Register data, which excludes lakes, ponds, glaciers > 1 km^{2} (0.386 sq mi or 247 acres) and river estuaries.

Fréterive is a commune in the Savoie department in the Auvergne-Rhône-Alpes region in south-eastern France.

== See also ==
- Communes of the Savoie department
