= Montsapey =

Montsapey Monsapa (Savoyard)
- Commune
- Location of Montsapey
- Location within France Location within Auvergne-Rhône-Alpes
- Coordinates: 45°31′26″N 6°20′22″E
- Country: France
- Region: Auvergne-Rhône-Alpes
- Department: Savoie
- Arrondissement: Saint-Jean-de-Maurienne
- Canton: Saint-Pierre-d'Albigny
- Intercommunality: Porte de Maurienne

Government
  - Mayor (2020–2026): Bernard Fargeas
- Area^{1}: 26.36 km^{2} (10.18 sq mi)
- Highest elevation: 2,500 m (8,200 ft)
- Lowest elevation: 324 m (1,063 ft)
- Population (2023): 85
  - Density: 3.2/km^{2} (8.4/sq mi)
- Time zone: UTC+01:00 (CET)
  - Summer (DST): UTC+02:00 (CEST)
- INSEE/Postal code: 73175 /73220
- Website: www.montsapey.fr
- ^{1} French Land Register data, which excludes lakes, ponds, glaciers > 1 km^{2} (0.386 sq mi or 247 acres) and river estuaries.

Montsapey (French pronunciation: [mɔ̃sapɛ]; Savoyard: Monsapa) is a commune in the Savoie department in the Auvergne-Rhône-Alpes region in south-eastern France.

== See also ==
- Communes of the Savoie department
