= Saint-Georges-d'Hurtières =

Saint-Georges-d'Hurtières Sin Zhourzhe (Savoyard)
- Commune
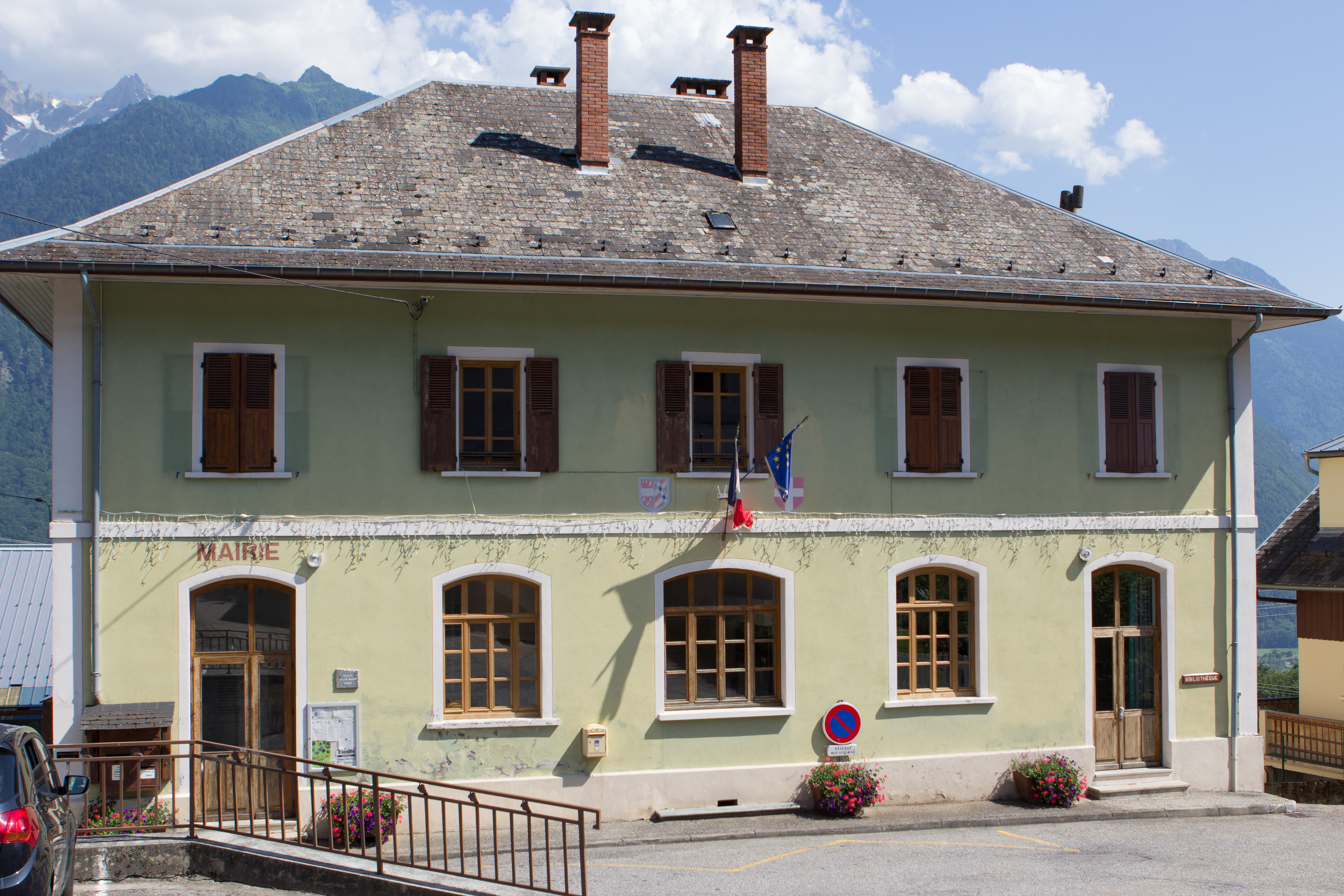
- The town hall in Saint-Georges-d'Hurtières
- Location of Saint-Georges-d'Hurtières
- Location within France Location within Auvergne-Rhône-Alpes
- Coordinates: 45°30′07″N 6°17′13″E
- Country: France
- Region: Auvergne-Rhône-Alpes
- Department: Savoie
- Arrondissement: Saint-Jean-de-Maurienne
- Canton: Saint-Pierre-d'Albigny
- Intercommunality: Porte de Maurienne

Government
  - Mayor (2020–2026): Andre Brunet
- Area^{1}: 11.85 km^{2} (4.58 sq mi)
- Highest elevation: 1,470 m (4,820 ft)
- Lowest elevation: 325 m (1,066 ft)
- Population (2023): 410
  - Density: 35/km^{2} (90/sq mi)
- Time zone: UTC+01:00 (CET)
  - Summer (DST): UTC+02:00 (CEST)
- INSEE/Postal code: 73237 /73220
- ^{1} French Land Register data, which excludes lakes, ponds, glaciers > 1 km^{2} (0.386 sq mi or 247 acres) and river estuaries.

Saint-Georges-d'Hurtières (French pronunciation: [sɛ̃ ʒɔʁʒ dyʁtjɛʁ]; before 2013, Saint-Georges-des-Hurtières; Savoyard: Sin Zhourzhe) is a commune in the Savoie department in the Auvergne-Rhône-Alpes region in south-eastern France.

== See also ==
- Communes of the Savoie department
