= Saint-Alban-d'Hurtières =

Saint-Alban-d'Hurtières Sèt Arban (Savoyard)
- Commune
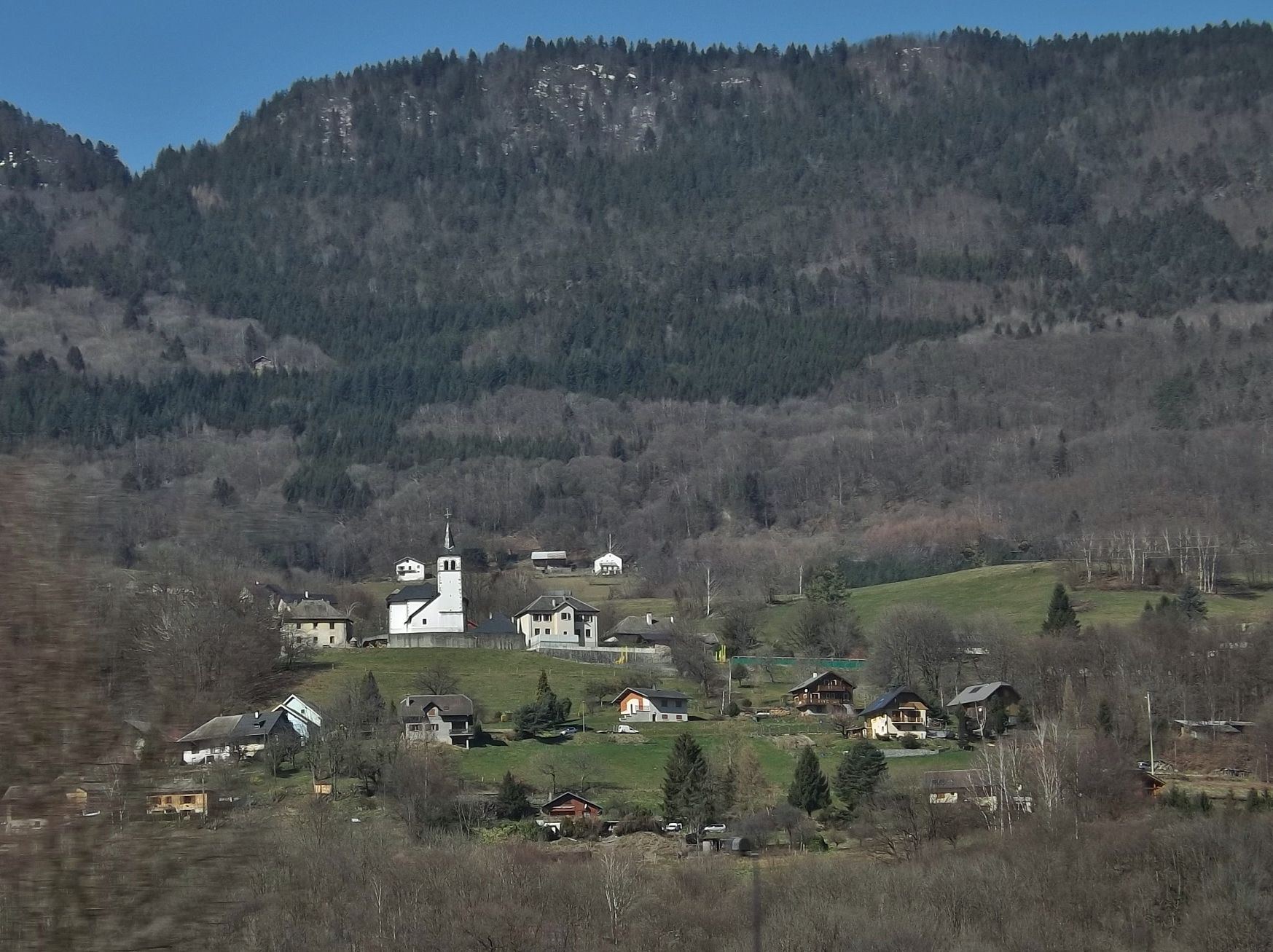
- A general view of Saint-Alban-d'Hurtières
- Location of Saint-Alban-d'Hurtières
- Location within France Location within Auvergne-Rhône-Alpes
- Coordinates: 45°29′03″N 6°16′37″E
- Country: France
- Region: Auvergne-Rhône-Alpes
- Department: Savoie
- Arrondissement: Saint-Jean-de-Maurienne
- Canton: Saint-Pierre-d'Albigny
- Intercommunality: Porte de Maurienne

Government
  - Mayor (2020–2026): Jean-François Thiaffey
- Area^{1}: 19.4 km^{2} (7.5 sq mi)
- Highest elevation: 2,069 m (6,788 ft)
- Lowest elevation: 341 m (1,119 ft)
- Population (2023): 404
  - Density: 20.8/km^{2} (53.9/sq mi)
- Time zone: UTC+01:00 (CET)
  - Summer (DST): UTC+02:00 (CEST)
- INSEE/Postal code: 73220 /73220
- ^{1} French Land Register data, which excludes lakes, ponds, glaciers > 1 km^{2} (0.386 sq mi or 247 acres) and river estuaries.

Saint-Alban-d'Hurtières (French pronunciation: [sɛ̃t‿albɑ̃ dyʁtjɛʁ]; before 2013: Saint-Alban-des-Hurtières; Savoyard: Sèt Arban) is a commune in the Savoie department in the Auvergne-Rhône-Alpes region in south-eastern France.

== Geography ==
=== Climate ===
Saint-Alban-d'Hurtières has an oceanic climate (Köppen climate classification Cfb). The average annual temperature in Saint-Alban-d'Hurtières is 11.0 °C (51.8 °F). The average annual rainfall is 1,274.5 mm (50.18 in) with December as the wettest month. The temperatures are highest on average in July, at around 20.2 °C (68.4 °F), and lowest in January, at around 2.0 °C (35.6 °F). The highest temperature ever recorded in Saint-Alban-d'Hurtières was 39.0 °C (102.2 °F) on 2 July 1952; the coldest temperature ever recorded was −17.6 °C (0.3 °F) on 6 January 1985.

Climate data for Saint-Alban-d'Hurtières (1991−2020 normals, extremes 1935−present)
Month	Jan	Feb	Mar	Apr	May	Jun	Jul	Aug	Sep	Oct	Nov	Dec	Year
Record high °C (°F)	17.6 (63.7)	21.8 (71.2)	25.8 (78.4)	28.7 (83.7)	34.0 (93.2)	35.4 (95.7)	39.0 (102.2)	38.0 (100.4)	33.0 (91.4)	27.1 (80.8)	22.7 (72.9)	21.8 (71.2)	39.0 (102.2)
Mean daily maximum °C (°F)	5.4 (41.7)	7.4 (45.3)	12.5 (54.5)	16.4 (61.5)	20.2 (68.4)	23.9 (75.0)	26.3 (79.3)	25.9 (78.6)	21.2 (70.2)	16.2 (61.2)	9.8 (49.6)	5.6 (42.1)	15.9 (60.6)
Daily mean °C (°F)	2.0 (35.6)	3.2 (37.8)	7.4 (45.3)	10.8 (51.4)	14.6 (58.3)	18.1 (64.6)	20.2 (68.4)	19.9 (67.8)	15.9 (60.6)	11.7 (53.1)	6.1 (43.0)	2.5 (36.5)	11.0 (51.8)
Mean daily minimum °C (°F)	−1.5 (29.3)	−1.0 (30.2)	2.3 (36.1)	5.3 (41.5)	9.0 (48.2)	12.2 (54.0)	14.1 (57.4)	14.0 (57.2)	10.6 (51.1)	7.1 (44.8)	2.4 (36.3)	−0.6 (30.9)	6.2 (43.2)
Record low °C (°F)	−17.6 (0.3)	−16.8 (1.8)	−11.2 (11.8)	−6.0 (21.2)	−2.0 (28.4)	0.6 (33.1)	5.0 (41.0)	4.1 (39.4)	0.0 (32.0)	−3.8 (25.2)	−9.8 (14.4)	−15.0 (5.0)	−17.6 (0.3)
Average precipitation mm (inches)	121.6 (4.79)	91.9 (3.62)	101.3 (3.99)	91.6 (3.61)	111.4 (4.39)	107.4 (4.23)	97.1 (3.82)	100.4 (3.95)	95.2 (3.75)	101.8 (4.01)	121.5 (4.78)	133.3 (5.25)	1,274.5 (50.18)
Average precipitation days (≥ 1.0 mm)	9.7	8.8	9.1	9.8	12.5	11.1	9.2	9.4	8.7	10.1	10.0	11.3	119.7
Source: Météo-France

== See also ==
- Communes of the Savoie department
