= Argentine, Savoie =

Argentine Arzhantena (Savoyard)
- Commune
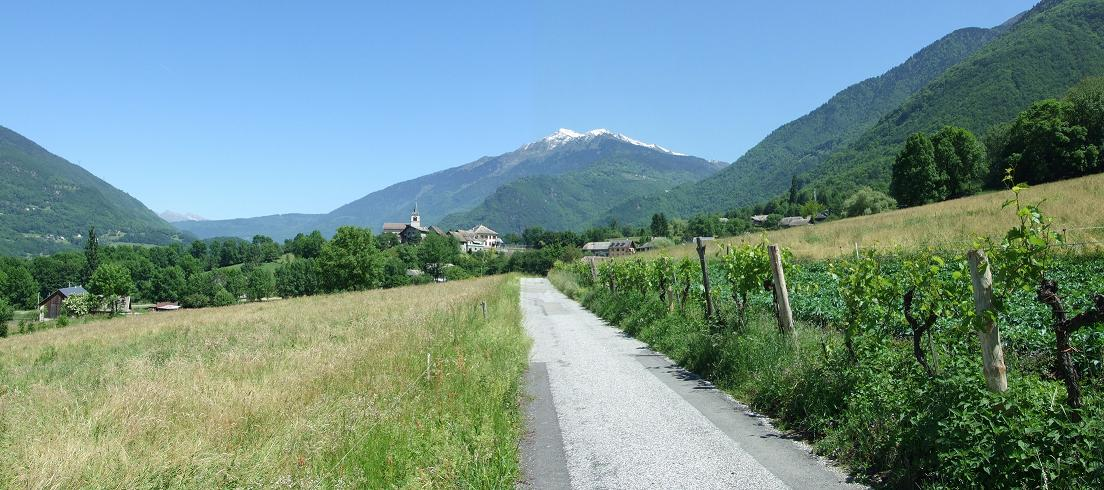
- Summit of the Grand Arc seen from Argentine
- Location of Argentine
- Location within France Location within Auvergne-Rhône-Alpes
- Coordinates: 45°29′41″N 6°18′49″E
- Country: France
- Region: Auvergne-Rhône-Alpes
- Department: Savoie
- Arrondissement: Saint-Jean-de-Maurienne
- Canton: Saint-Pierre-d'Albigny
- Intercommunality: CC Porte de Maurienne

Government
  - Mayor (2020–2026): Jean-Claude Perrier
- Area^{1}: 28.03 km^{2} (10.82 sq mi)
- Highest elevation: 2,696 m (8,845 ft)
- Lowest elevation: 326 m (1,070 ft)
- Population (2023): 959
  - Density: 34.2/km^{2} (88.6/sq mi)
- Time zone: UTC+01:00 (CET)
  - Summer (DST): UTC+02:00 (CEST)
- INSEE/Postal code: 73019 /73220
- Website: argentine-savoie.fr
- ^{1} French Land Register data, which excludes lakes, ponds, glaciers > 1 km^{2} (0.386 sq mi or 247 acres) and river estuaries.

Argentine (French pronunciation: [aʁʒɑ̃tin]; Savoyard: Arzhantena) is a commune in the Savoie department in the Auvergne-Rhône-Alpes region in south-eastern France.

== Toponymy ==
In medieval documents, Argentine is attested under the forms Argentina in 1129 and 1184, Argentine in 1129 and 1285, and apud Argentinam in 1269.

The place name derives from Latin argentaria, or from Gaulish arganto, and refers to the site of real or supposed metal-bearing mines. In the case of the Savoyard commune, the name refers to the silver-bearing lead mines formerly worked within its territory. The source Histoire des communes savoyardes describes it as the only existing place name of this type in France.

In Arpitan, the name of the commune is written Arzhantena according to the Conflans orthography.

== History ==
=== Medieval period ===
The silver-bearing lead mines of Montchabert appear to have given their name first to the parish and later to the commune. Iron was also worked by the inhabitants in foundries during the Middle Ages, although no trace of this proto-industrial activity is known before the 12th century.

A papal bull of Lucius III in 1184 confirmed the episcopal jurisdiction of Maurienne over seventeen parishes, including Argentine.

The Bishop of Maurienne had a castle built at Argentine, which is mentioned in 1269. In 1285, a dispute broke out between the bishop and the Count of Savoy over rights in Argentine; the bishop obtained confirmation of his rights. Around this period, the castle became the seat of an episcopal castellany. According to Canon Adolphe Gros, another castle, known as the Tour Brûlée, may also have existed.

=== Modern and contemporary period ===
Like most episcopal possessions in the area, known as the Terre limitée, the parish was partly enfranchised in 1768, under certain conditions and in exchange for an annual cens of 760 livres.

The Duchy of Savoy was occupied by French Revolutionary troops from 1792 and remained under French rule until 1815.

During the withdrawal of German troops in 1944, near the end of the Second World War, the commune, like neighboring villages, suffered destruction, notably at the parish church.

== See also ==
- Communes of the Savoie department
