= Bourgneuf, Savoie =

Bourgneuf Bornouv (Savoyard)
- Commune
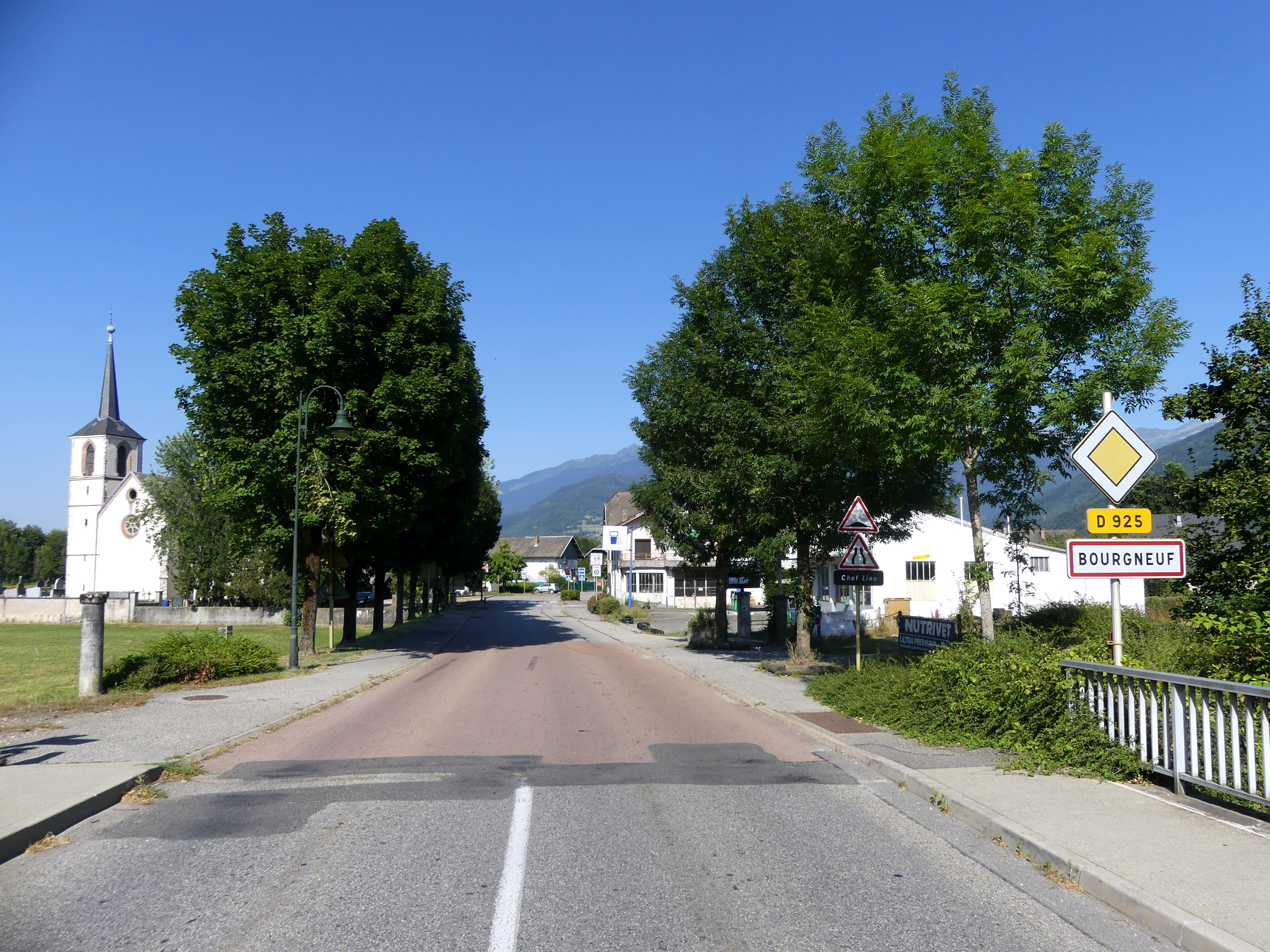
- The road into Bourgneuf
- Location of Bourgneuf
- Location within France Location within Auvergne-Rhône-Alpes
- Coordinates: 45°33′10″N 6°12′43″E
- Country: France
- Region: Auvergne-Rhône-Alpes
- Department: Savoie
- Arrondissement: Chambéry
- Canton: Saint-Pierre-d'Albigny
- Intercommunality: Cœur de Savoie

Government
  - Mayor (2020–2026): Nicole Bouvier
- Area^{1}: 6.48 km^{2} (2.50 sq mi)
- Highest elevation: 656 m (2,152 ft)
- Lowest elevation: 286 m (938 ft)
- Population (2023): 656
  - Density: 101/km^{2} (262/sq mi)
- Time zone: UTC+01:00 (CET)
  - Summer (DST): UTC+02:00 (CEST)
- INSEE/Postal code: 73053 /73390
- ^{1} French Land Register data, which excludes lakes, ponds, glaciers > 1 km^{2} (0.386 sq mi or 247 acres) and river estuaries.

Bourgneuf (French pronunciation: [buʁnœf]; Arpitan: Bornouv) is a commune in the Savoie department in the Auvergne-Rhône-Alpes region in south-eastern France.

== See also ==
- Communes of the Savoie department
