= Bonvillaret =

Bonvillaret Bonvlarè (Savoyard)
- Commune
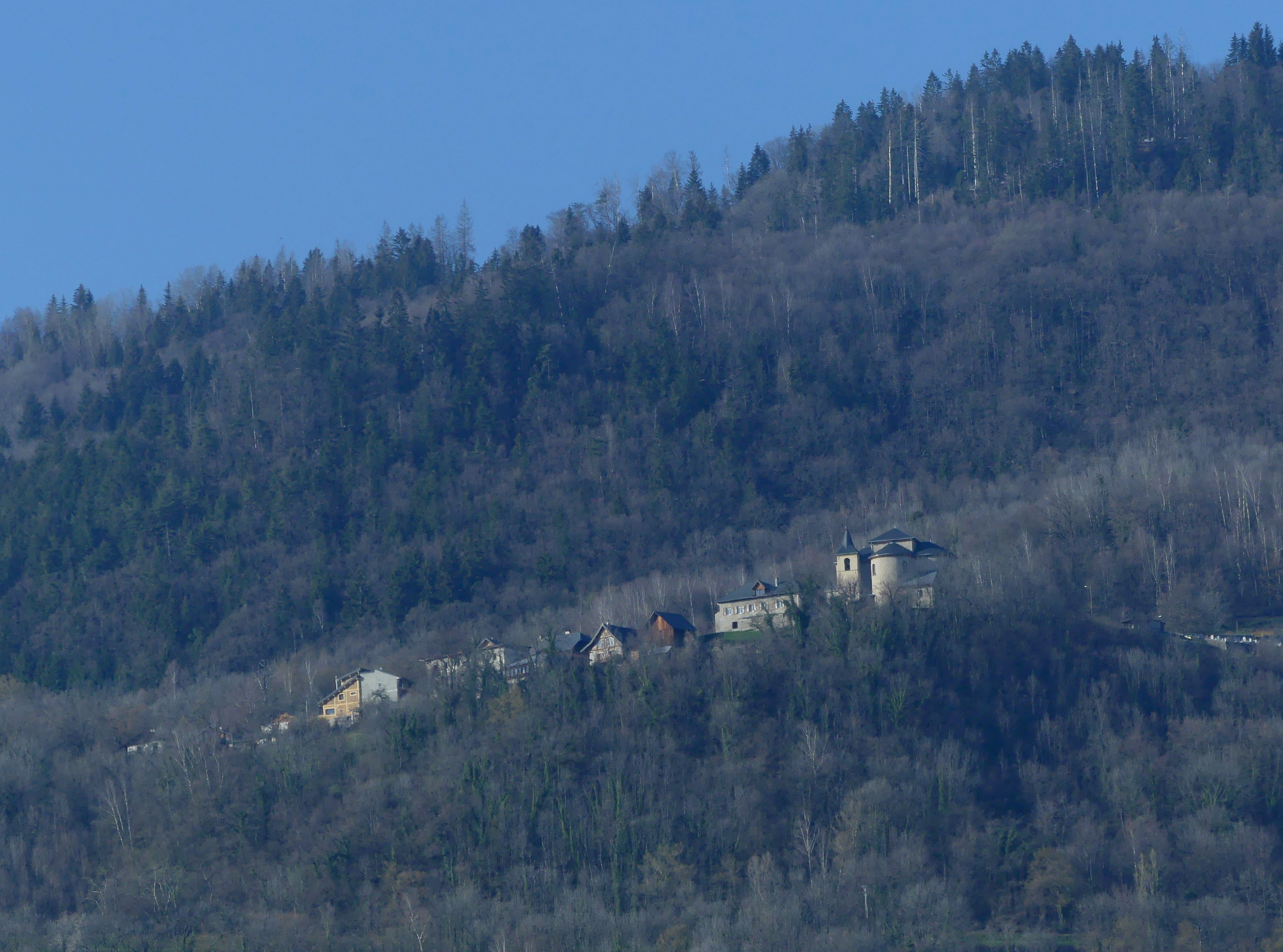
- Location of Bonvillaret
- Location within France Location within Auvergne-Rhône-Alpes
- Coordinates: 45°33′48″N 6°18′05″E
- Country: France
- Region: Auvergne-Rhône-Alpes
- Department: Savoie
- Arrondissement: Saint-Jean-de-Maurienne
- Canton: Saint-Pierre-d'Albigny
- Intercommunality: Porte de Maurienne

Government
  - Mayor (2020–2026): Jacky Demonnaz
- Area^{1}: 8.88 km^{2} (3.43 sq mi)
- Highest elevation: 2,363 m (7,753 ft)
- Lowest elevation: 304 m (997 ft)
- Population (2023): 154
  - Density: 17.3/km^{2} (44.9/sq mi)
- Time zone: UTC+01:00 (CET)
  - Summer (DST): UTC+02:00 (CEST)
- INSEE/Postal code: 73049 /73220
- ^{1} French Land Register data, which excludes lakes, ponds, glaciers > 1 km^{2} (0.386 sq mi or 247 acres) and river estuaries.

Bonvillaret (Savoyard: Bonvlarè) is a commune in the Savoie department in the Auvergne-Rhône-Alpes region in south-eastern France.

== See also ==
- Communes of the Savoie department
