= Jean Chamoux =

French photographer

Jean Chamoux (1925, La Roche-sur-Foron – 2007) was a French photographer who started his career during World War II in the Savoyard bush. He first covered the landings by parachute during the Battle of Glières (1 August 1944).

He settled in Paris in 1947 and worked actively until the 1980s. He did a number of coverages in France and in the Middle East. Although he worked together with Robert Doisneau and Edouard Boubat in particular, he has always remained very discreet and has only exhibited his works once in the near suburbs of Paris.

He nevertheless took photographs of such various figures as Blaise Cendrars, Jean Cocteau, Paul Fort, Lino Ventura, Habib Bourguiba or Madame René Coty in their homes, and was regarded as a first rank photographer in fashion and industry. More particularly he was one of the first to take coloured photographs on a wide scale and in big format print (4"x 5" and 5"x17"m) and the first to process his proper colour films in Paris (Ektachrome E3).

This technical skill - rather unusual at the time - coupled with an ability to carry out special tricks and effects (stroboscopic effect through multiple exposure, use of electric lighting on a large scale with flash ramps) has contributed to his success in the press and industry (EDF, Ribet-Desjardins, L'Oréal, Formica, Synergie ...)"
