= Chamoux-sur-Gelon =

Chamoux-sur-Gelon Shamou (Arpitan)
- Commune
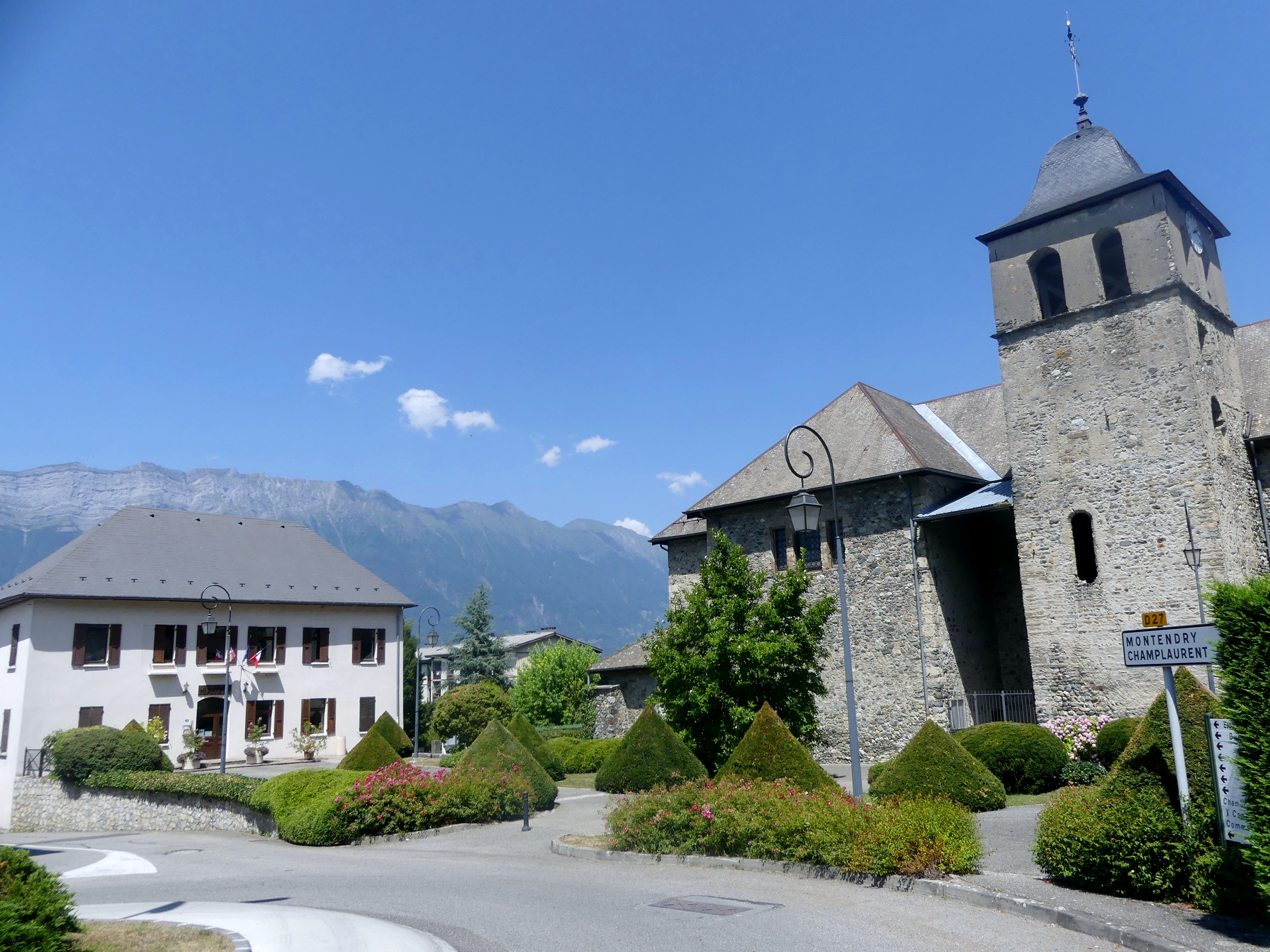
- Location of Chamoux-sur-Gelon
- Location within France Location within Auvergne-Rhône-Alpes
- Coordinates: 45°32′00″N 6°12′59″E
- Country: France
- Region: Auvergne-Rhône-Alpes
- Department: Savoie
- Arrondissement: Chambéry
- Canton: Saint-Pierre-d'Albigny

Government
  - Mayor (2020–2026): Alexandre Dalla-Mutta
- Area^{1}: 10.63 km^{2} (4.10 sq mi)
- Highest elevation: 1,052 m (3,451 ft)
- Lowest elevation: 287 m (942 ft)
- Population (2023): 966
  - Density: 90.9/km^{2} (235/sq mi)
- Time zone: UTC+01:00 (CET)
  - Summer (DST): UTC+02:00 (CEST)
- INSEE/Postal code: 73069 /73390
- ^{1} French Land Register data, which excludes lakes, ponds, glaciers > 1 km^{2} (0.386 sq mi or 247 acres) and river estuaries.

Chamoux-sur-Gelon (French pronunciation: [ʃamu syʁ ʒəlɔ̃]; Arpitan: Shamou) is a commune in the Savoie department in the Auvergne-Rhône-Alpes region in south-eastern France.

== See also ==
- Communes of the Savoie department
