= Coise-Saint-Jean-Pied-Gauthier =

- Commune
- Location of Coise-Saint-Jean-Pied-Gauthier
- Location within France Location within Auvergne-Rhône-Alpes
- Coordinates: 45°31′36″N 6°08′36″E
- Country: France
- Region: Auvergne-Rhône-Alpes
- Department: Savoie
- Arrondissement: Chambéry
- Canton: Saint-Pierre-d'Albigny

Government
  - Mayor (2020–2026): Jean-Luc Benetti
- Area^{1}: 10.38 km^{2} (4.01 sq mi)
- Highest elevation: 419 m (1,375 ft)
- Lowest elevation: 268 m (879 ft)
- Population (2023): 1,305
  - Density: 125.7/km^{2} (325.6/sq mi)
- Time zone: UTC+01:00 (CET)
  - Summer (DST): UTC+02:00 (CEST)
- INSEE/Postal code: 73089 /73800
- Website: coisesaintjeanpiedgauthier.fr
- ^{1} French Land Register data, which excludes lakes, ponds, glaciers > 1 km^{2} (0.386 sq mi or 247 acres) and river estuaries.

Coise-Saint-Jean-Pied-Gauthier (French pronunciation: [kwaz sɛ̃ ʒɑ̃ pje ɡotje]; Arpitan: Kouéze) is a commune in the Savoie department in the Auvergne-Rhône-Alpes region in south-eastern France.

== Geography ==
The Chéran forms the commune's western border.

== See also ==
- Communes of the Savoie department
