= Communes of the Savoie department =

The following is a list of the 273 communes of the Savoie department of France.

The communes cooperate in the following intercommunalities (as of 2025):

- Communauté d'agglomération Arlysère
- Communauté d'agglomération Grand Chambéry
- Communauté d'agglomération Grand Lac
- Communauté de communes du Canton de La Chambre
- Communauté de communes Cœur de Chartreuse (partly)
- Communauté de communes Cœur de Maurienne Arvan
- Communauté de communes Cœur de Savoie
- Communauté de communes Cœur de Tarentaise
- Communauté de communes Haute Maurienne Vanoise
- Communauté de communes de Haute Tarentaise
- Communauté de communes du Lac d'Aiguebelette
- Communauté de communes Maurienne-Galibier
- Communauté de communes Porte de Maurienne
- Communauté de communes Val Guiers
- Communauté de communes Val Vanoise
- Communauté de communes des Vallées d’Aigueblanche
- Communauté de communes Les Versants d’Aime
- Communauté de communes de Yenne

INSEE code	Postal code	Commune
73001	73610	Aiguebelette-le-Lac
73004	73340	Aillon-le-Jeune
73005	73340	Aillon-le-Vieux
73006	73210	Aime-la-Plagne
73007	73220	Aiton
73008	73100	Aix-les-Bains
73011	73200	Albertville
73012	73300	Albiez-le-Jeune
73013	73300	Albiez-Montrond
73014	73200	Allondaz
73015	73550	Les Allues
73017	73190	Apremont
73018	73800	Arbin
73019	73220	Argentine
73020	73340	Arith
73021	73110	Arvillard
73022	73610	Attignat-Oncin
73023	73500	Aussois
73024	73260	Les Avanchers-Valmorel
73025	73240	Avressieux
73026	73500	Avrieux
73027	73470	Ayn
73028	73170	La Balme
73029	73000	Barberaz
73030	73230	Barby
73031	73000	Bassens
73032	73540	La Bâthie
73033	73360	La Bauche
73034	73270	Beaufort
73036	73340	Bellecombe-en-Bauges
73257	73440	Les Belleville
73039	73330	Belmont-Tramonet
73040	73480	Bessans
73041	73390	Betton-Bettonet
73042	73170	Billième
73043	73410	La Biolle
73047	73480	Bonneval-sur-Arc
73048	73460	Bonvillard
73049	73220	Bonvillaret
73050	73370	Bourdeau
73051	73370	Le Bourget-du-Lac
73052	73110	Bourget-en-Huile
73053	73390	Bourgneuf
73054	73700	Bourg-Saint-Maurice
73055	73350	Bozel
73057	73570	Brides-les-Bains
73058	73520	La Bridoire
73059	73100	Brison-Saint-Innocent
73061	73200	Césarches
73063	73730	Cevins
73064	73190	Challes-les-Eaux
73065	73000	Chambéry
73067	73130	La Chambre
73068	73390	Chamousset
73069	73390	Chamoux-sur-Gelon
73070	73240	Champagneux
73071	73350	Champagny-en-Vanoise
73072	73390	Champ-Laurent
73073	73310	Chanaz
73074	73660	La Chapelle
73075	73110	La Chapelle-Blanche
73076	73370	La Chapelle-du-Mont-du-Chat
73077	73700	Les Chapelles
73078	73170	La Chapelle-Saint-Martin
73079	73390	Châteauneuf
73081	73630	Le Châtelard
73082	73800	La Chavanne
73083	73660	Les Chavannes-en-Maurienne
73084	73800	Chignin
73085	73310	Chindrieux
73086	73460	Cléry
73087	73160	Cognin
73088	73400	Cohennoz
73089	73800	Coise-Saint-Jean-Pied-Gauthier
73090	73630	La Compôte
73091	73310	Conjux
73092	73160	Corbel
73227	73120	Courchevel
73094	73590	Crest-Voland
73095	73110	La Croix-de-la-Rochette
73096	73800	Cruet
73097	73190	Curienne
73098	73230	Les Déserts
73099	73110	Détrier
73100	73330	Domessin
73101	73630	Doucy-en-Bauges
73103	73420	Drumettaz-Clarafond
73104	73610	Dullin
73105	73360	Les Échelles
73106	73630	École
73010	73410	Entrelacs
73107	73670	Entremont-le-Vieux
73109	73220	Épierre
73110	73540	Esserts-Blay
73113	73350	Feissons-sur-Salins
73114	73590	Flumet
73116	73300	Fontcouverte-la-Toussuire
73117	73500	Fourneaux
73119	73500	Freney
73120	73250	Fréterive
73121	73460	Frontenex
73122	73470	Gerbaix
73123	73590	La Giettaz
73124	73200	Gilly-sur-Isère
73003	73260	Grand-Aigueblanche
73128	73100	Grésy-sur-Aix
73129	73460	Grésy-sur-Isère
73130	73200	Grignon
73131	73600	Hautecour
73132	73620	Hauteluce
73133	73390	Hauteville
73137	73000	Jacob-Bellecombette
73138	73300	Jarrier
73139	73630	Jarsy
73140	73170	Jongieux
73141	73800	Laissaud
73142	73210	Landry
73187	73260	La Léchère
73145	73610	Lépin-le-Lac
73146	73340	Lescheraines
73147	73170	Loisieux
73149	73170	Lucey
73152	73470	Marcieux
73153	73400	Marthod
73154	73200	Mercury
73155	73420	Méry
73156	73170	Meyrieux-Trouet
73157	73500	Modane
73159	73800	Les Mollettes
73160	73000	Montagnole
73161	73350	Montagny
73162	73460	Montailleur
73164	73100	Montcel

INSEE code	Postal code	Commune
73166	73390	Montendry
73168	73220	Montgilbert
73170	73200	Monthion
73171	73800	Montmélian
73173	73870	Montricher-Albanne
73175	73220	Montsapey
73176	73700	Montvalezan
73177	73300	Montvernier
73178	73340	La Motte-en-Bauges
73179	73290	La Motte-Servolex
73180	73310	Motz
73181	73600	Moûtiers
73182	73100	Mouxy
73183	73800	Myans
73184	73470	Nances
73186	73590	Notre-Dame-de-Bellecombe
73188	73460	Notre-Dame-des-Millières
73189	73130	Notre-Dame-du-Cruet
73190	73600	Notre-Dame-du-Pré
73191	73470	Novalaise
73192	73340	Le Noyer
73193	73310	Ontex
73194	73140	Orelle
73196	73200	Pallud
73197	73210	Peisey-Nancroix
73150	73210	La Plagne-Tarentaise
73200	73800	Planaise
73201	73350	Planay
73202	73200	Plancherine
73204	73330	Le Pont-de-Beauvoisin
73205	73110	Le Pontet
73151	73800	Porte-de-Savoie
73206	73710	Pralognan-la-Vanoise
73207	73110	Presle
73208	73100	Pugny-Chatenod
73210	73190	Puygros
73211	73720	Queige
73213	73490	La Ravoire
73214	73240	Rochefort
73216	73730	Rognaix
73217	73110	Rotherens
73218	73310	Ruffieux
73219	73610	Saint-Alban-de-Montbel
73220	73220	Saint-Alban-d'Hurtières
73221	73130	Saint-Alban-des-Villards
73222	73230	Saint-Alban-Leysse
73223	73500	Saint-André
73224	73130	Saint-Avre
73225	73190	Saint-Baldoph
73226	73520	Saint-Béron
73228	73160	Saint-Cassin
73229	73360	Saint-Christophe
73230	73130	Saint-Colomban-des-Villards
73232	73640	Sainte-Foy-Tarentaise
73240	73800	Sainte-Hélène-du-Lac
73241	73460	Sainte-Hélène-sur-Isère
73254	73240	Sainte-Marie-d'Alvey
73255	73130	Sainte-Marie-de-Cuines
73277	73630	Sainte-Reine
73231	73130	Saint-Étienne-de-Cuines
73233	73360	Saint-Franc
73234	73340	Saint-François-de-Sales
73235	73130	Saint-François-Longchamp
73236	73240	Saint-Genix-les-Villages
73237	73220	Saint-Georges-d'Hurtières
73242	73530	Saint-Jean-d'Arves
73243	73230	Saint-Jean-d'Arvey
73245	73170	Saint-Jean-de-Chevelu
73246	73160	Saint-Jean-de-Couz
73247	73250	Saint-Jean-de-la-Porte
73248	73300	Saint-Jean-de-Maurienne
73249	73190	Saint-Jeoire-Prieuré
73250	73870	Saint-Julien-Mont-Denis
73252	73220	Saint-Léger
73253	73600	Saint-Marcel
73256	73140	Saint-Martin-d'Arc
73258	73140	Saint-Martin-de-la-Porte
73259	73130	Saint-Martin-sur-la-Chambre
73261	73140	Saint-Michel-de-Maurienne
73262	73590	Saint-Nicolas-la-Chapelle
73263	73100	Saint-Offenge
73265	73410	Saint-Ours
73267	73300	Saint-Pancrace
73269	73170	Saint-Paul
73268	73730	Saint-Paul-sur-Isère
73270	73250	Saint-Pierre-d'Albigny
73271	73170	Saint-Pierre-d'Alvey
73272	73220	Saint-Pierre-de-Belleville
73273	73310	Saint-Pierre-de-Curtille
73275	73360	Saint-Pierre-de-Genebroz
73274	73670	Saint-Pierre-d'Entremont
73276	73800	Saint-Pierre-de-Soucy
73278	73660	Saint-Rémy-de-Maurienne
73280	73530	Saint-Sorlin-d'Arves
73281	73160	Saint-Sulpice
73282	73160	Saint-Thibaud-de-Couz
73283	73460	Saint-Vital
73284	73600	Salins-Fontaine
73285	73700	Séez
73286	73310	Serrières-en-Chautagne
73288	73000	Sonnaz
73289	73110	La Table
73292	73200	Thénésol
73293	73230	Thoiry
73294	73190	La Thuile
73296	73320	Tignes
73135	73300	La Tour-en-Maurienne
73297	73460	Tournon
73298	73790	Tours-en-Savoie
73299	73170	Traize
73300	73100	Tresserve
73301	73100	Trévignin
73302	73110	La Trinité
73303	73400	Ugine
73290	73500	Val-Cenis
73212	73220	Val-d'Arc
73304	73150	Val-d'Isère
73215	73110	Valgelon-La Rochette
73306	73450	Valloire
73307	73450	Valmeinier
73308	73200	Venthon
73309	73330	Verel-de-Montbel
73310	73230	Verel-Pragondran
73311	73110	Le Verneil
73312	73460	Verrens-Arvey
73313	73170	Verthemex
73314	73800	Villard-d'Héry
73315	73390	Villard-Léger
73316	73110	Villard-Sallet
73317	73270	Villard-sur-Doron
73318	73300	Villarembert
73320	73300	Villargondran
73322	73500	Villarodin-Bourget
73323	73640	Villaroger
73324	73110	Villaroux
73326	73160	Vimines
73327	73310	Vions
73328	73420	Viviers-du-Lac
73329	73420	Voglans
73330	73170	Yenne
