= Canton of Saint-Pierre-d'Albigny =

Coordinates: 45.57°N 6.16°E

The canton of Saint-Pierre-d'Albigny is an administrative division of the Savoie department, southeastern France. Its borders were modified at the French canton reorganisation which came into effect in March 2015. Its seat is in Saint-Pierre-d'Albigny.

It consists of the following communes:

1. Aiton
2. Argentine
3. Betton-Bettonet
4. Bonvillaret
5. Bourgneuf
6. Chamousset
7. Chamoux-sur-Gelon
8. Champ-Laurent
9. Châteauneuf
10. Coise-Saint-Jean-Pied-Gauthier
11. Cruet
12. Épierre
13. Fréterive
14. Hauteville
15. Montendry
16. Montgilbert
17. Montsapey
18. Saint-Alban-d'Hurtières
19. Saint-Georges-d'Hurtières
20. Saint-Jean-de-la-Porte
21. Saint-Léger
22. Saint-Pierre-d'Albigny
23. Saint-Pierre-de-Belleville
24. Val-d'Arc
25. Villard-Léger
