= List of historical monuments in Savoy =

French historical monument

This article contains a list of historical monuments in Savoy department, France.

== Statistics ==
As at February 12, 2023, Savoy had 220 buildings protected as historic monuments, of which 90 were listed and 144 registered. The total number of listed and registered monuments is greater than the total number of protected monuments, as several of them are both listed and registered.

Chambéry is home to 25 of these protected monuments, i.e. 12% of the total. Aix-les-Bains has 17, Bonneval-sur-Arc 12 and Albertville 10, while some 200 communes (70%) have none.

Three protected buildings are grouped together:

- in Bessans, a single protection covers the church and almost thirty separate chapels and oratories;
- in Lanslevillard, a single protection covers a bridge and almost a dozen chapels;
- in Saint-Sorlin-d'Arves, a single protection covers the church, cemetery, former town hall and several chapels, crosses and oratories.

Pont Morens straddles the communes of La Chavanne and Montmélian.

== List ==
Monument	Commune	Address	Info.	Protection	Date	Picture
Site archéologique de Beau-Phare au Lac d'Aiguebelette (Archaeological site of Beau-Phare at Lac d'Aiguebelette)	Aiguebelette-le-Lac		Archaeological site of Beau-Phare (or Boffard) submerged in Lake Aiguebelette	Classified	2011	
Chartreuse d'Aillon	Aillon-le-Jeune		Former Charterhouse of Aillon	Registered	1994	
Croix de cimetière de la Correrie (Correrie cemetery cross)	Aillon-le-Jeune		Correrie cemetery cross	Registered	1944	
Basilique Saint-Martin d'Aime (Saint-Martin d'Aime Basilica)	Aime		Saint-Martin Basilica	Classified	1875	
Église Saint-Sigismond d'Aime (Saint-Sigismond d'Aime church)	Aime		Parish church	Registered	1984	
Tour de Montmayeur (Montmayeur Tower)	Aime		Montmayeur Tower	Registered	1983	
Arc de Campanus (Campanus Arch)	Aix-les-Bains	Place Maurice Mollard	Campanus Arch	Classified	1890	
Chalet Charcot	Aix-les-Bains	29 rue Georges-Ier	Chalet Charcot	Registered	1986	
Château de la Roche du Roi (Roche du Roi Castle)	Aix-les-Bains	Boulevard de la Roche-du-Roi	Roche du Roi Castle	Classified	1986	
Grand Hôtel	Aix-les-Bains	3 place du Revard	Grand Hôtel	Registered	1986	
Hôtel Bernascon	Aix-les-Bains	6 boulevard de la Roche-du-Roi	Hôtel Bernascon	Registered	1986	
Hôtel Excelsior	Aix-les-Bains	50 rue Georges-Ier	Hôtel Excelsior	Classified Registered	1987 1987	
Hôtel Royal	Aix-les-Bains	31 rue Georges-Ier	Hôtel Royal	Classified Registered Registered	1987 1987 2010	
Hôtel Splendide	Aix-les-Bains	31 rue Georges-Ier	Hôtel Splendide	Classified Registered Registered	1987 1987 2010	
Hôtel de ville d'Aix-les-Bains	Aix-les-Bains	Place Maurice Mollard	Hôtel de ville d'Aix-les-Bains	Classified Classified	1890 1982	
Maison de Lamartine (Lamartine house)	Aix-les-Bains	Rue des Bains-Henri-IV	Lamartine house	Classified	1921	
Monument à l'Alsace et à la Lorraine d'Aix-les-Bains (Aix-les-Bains Monument to Alsace and Lorraine)	Aix-les-Bains	7 rue Claude-de-Seyssel	Aix-les-Bains Monument to Alsace and Lorraine	Registered	2019	
Monument aux morts d'Aix-les-Bains (Aix-les-Bains war memorial)	Aix-les-Bains	Square Alfred Boucher	Aix-les-Bains war memorial	Registered	2019	
Palais de Savoie (Savoy Palace)	Aix-les-Bains	Rue du Casino	Savoy Palace	Registered Classified	1975 2013	
Parc floral des Thermes (Thermal Floral Park)	Aix-les-Bains	Avenue Lord-Revelstoke	Thermal Floral Park	Registered	2008	
Temple de Diane	Aix-les-Bains	Square du Temple de Diane	Temple de Diane	Classified	1875	
Thermes nationaux d'Aix-les-Bains (Aix-les-Bains national thermal baths)	Aix-les-Bains	Place Maurice Mollard	Aix-les-Bains national thermal baths	Registered Registered	1986 2016	
Villa Chanéac	Aix-les-Bains	57 Boulevard de Paris	Villa Chanéac	Classified	2017	
Château de Manuel (Manuel Castle)	Albertville	Conflans	Manuel Castle	Registered	1928	
Château Rouge (Red Castle)	Albertville	Conflans	Red Castle	Registered	1928	
Église Notre-Dame-de-l'Assomption de Conflans (Church of Notre-Dame-de-l'Assomption in Conflans)	Albertville	Conflans	Church of Notre-Dame-de-l'Assomption in Conflans	Registered	1989	
Fontaine de la Grande-Place (Grande-Place fountain)	Albertville	Grande-Place	Grande-Place fountain	Registered	1928	
Fontaine Anselme (Anselme fountain)	Albertville	Rue Gabriel Pérouse	Anselme fountain	Registered	1928	
Maison à tourelles (Turret house)	Albertville	Conflans	Turret house	Registered	1928	
Petit Palais de Conflans (Little Palace of Conflans)	Albertville	Conflans	Little Palace of Conflans	Classified Classified	1904 1913	
Porte de Savoie	Albertville	Conflans	Porte de Savoie	Registered	1928	
Porte Tarine	Albertville	Conflans	Porte Tarine	Registered	1928	
Tour sarrazine d'Albertville (Albertville Sarrazine Tower)	Albertville		Albertville Sarrazine Tower	Registered	1928	
Chapelle Notre-Dame-de-Grâce d'Albiez-Montrond (Notre-Dame-de-Grâce chapel in Albiez-Montrond)	Albiez-Montrond	Le Collet d'En bas	Notre-Dame-de-Grâce chapel	Registered	1988	
Chalet Charlotte Perriand	Les Allues	Route des Chalets	Chalet Charlotte Perriand	Registered Classified	2015 2016	
Barrière de l'Esseillon (Esseillon barrier)	Aussois		Esseillon barrier	Classified	1983	
Barrière de l'Esseillon (Esseillon barrier)	Aussois		Esseillon barrier	Classified	1991	
Église Notre-Dame-de-l'Assomption d'Aussois (Notre-Dame-de-l'Assomption church in Aussois)	Aussois		Notre-Dame-de-l'Assomption church	Registered	1971	
Gravures rupestres d'Aussois (Aussois rock engravings)	Aussois		Aussois rock engravings	Registered Registered	1996 1999	
Colonne féodale des Avanchers (Avanchers feudal column)	Les Avanchers-Valmorel	D 95	Avanchers feudal column	Registered	1940	
Barrière de l'Esseillon (Esseillon barrier)	Avrieux		Esseillon barrier	Classified	1991	
Chapelle Notre-Dame-des-Neiges d'Avrieux (Notre-Dame-des-Neiges chapel in Avrieux)	Avrieux		Notre-Dame-des-Neiges chapel	Classified	1989	
Chapelle Saint-Benoît d'Avrieux (Saint-Benoît chapel in Avrieux)	Avrieux		Saint-Benoît chapel	Classified	1991	
Église Saint-Thomas-Becket d'Avrieux (Saint-Thomas-Becket church in Avrieux)	Avrieux		Saint-Thomas-Becket church	Classified	1989	
Château de la Bâtie (La Bâtie Castle)	Barby		La Bâtie Castle	Registered	1972	
Centre hospitalier spécialisé de Bassens (Bassens specialist hospital)	Bassens		Bassens specialist hospital	Registered	1984	
Chapelle Notre-Dame-de-la-Vie de Saint-Martin-de-Belleville (Notre-Dame-de-la-Vie chapel in Saint-Martin-de-Belleville)	Les Belleville	Saint-Martin-de-Belleville	Notre-Dame-de-la-Vie chapel	Classified	1949	
Croix de Saint-Martin-de-Belleville (Saint-Martin-de-Belleville cross)	Les Belleville	Saint-Martin-de-Belleville	Saint-Martin-de-Belleville cross	Classified	1944	
Chapelle Notre-Dame de Tierce (Notre-Dame chapel in Tierce)	Bessans	Tierce Crête de Tierce	Notre-Dame chapel	Registered	1996	
Chapelle Notre-Dame-des-Grâces de Bessans (Notre-Dame-des-Grâces chapel in Bessans)	Bessans		Notre-Dame-des-Grâces chapel	Registered	1996	
Chapelle Saint-Antoine de Bessans (Saint-Antoine chapel in Bessans)	Bessans		Saint-Antoine chapel	Classified	1987	
Chapelle Saint-Bernard-de-Menthon du Villaron (Saint-Bernard-de-Menthon chapel in Villaron)	Bessans	Le Villaron	Saint-Bernard-de-Menthon chapel	Registered	1996	
Chapelle Saint-Claude de Bessans (Saint-Claude chapel in Bessans)	Bessans		Saint-Claude chapel	Registered	1996	
Chapelle Saint-Colomban du Villaron (Saint-Colomban chapel in Villaron)	Bessans	Le Villaron	Saint-Colomban chapel	Registered	1996	
Chapelle Sainte-Anne du Crey (Sainte-Anne chapel in Grey)	Bessans	Le Crey Vallée d'Averolle	Sainte-Anne chapel	Registered	1996	
Chapelle Sainte-Anne de La Goulaz (Sainte-Anne chapel in La Goulaz)	Bessans	La Goulaz	Sainte-Anne chapel	Registered	1996	
Chapelle Sainte-Marie-Madeleine des Vincendières (Sainte-Marie-Madeleine chapel in Les Vincendières)	Bessans	Les Vincendières	Sainte-Marie-Madeleine chapel	Registered	1996	
Chapelle Saint-Étienne de Bessans (Saint-Étienne chapel in Bessans)	Bessans		Saint-Étienne chapel	Registered	1996	
Chapelle Saint-Jean-Baptiste de Bessans (Saint-Jean-Baptiste chapel in Bessans)	Bessans		Saint-Jean-Baptiste chapel	Registered	1996	
Chapelle Saint-Joseph-Saint-Clair de Bessans (Saint-Joseph-Saint-Clair chapel in Bessans)	Bessans		Saint-Joseph-Saint-Clair chapel	Registered	1996	
Chapelle Saint-Maurice de La Chalpe (Saint-Maurice chapel in La Chalpe)	Bessans	La Chalpe	Saint-Maurice chapel	Registered	1996	
Chapelle Saint-Pierre d'Averole (Saint-Pierre chapel in Averole)	Bessans	Averole	Saint-Pierre chapel	Registered	1996	
Chapelle Saint-Sébastien de Bessans (Saint-Sébastien chapel in Bessans)	Bessans		Saint-Sébastien chapel	Registered	1996	
Eglise Saint-Jean-Baptiste de Bessans (Saint-Jean-Baptiste chapel in Bessans)	Bessans		Saint-Jean-Baptiste chapel	Registered	1996	
Église Saint-Jean-Baptiste de Bessans (Saint-Jean-Baptiste church in Bessans)	Bessans		Saint-Jean-Baptiste church	Registered	1947	
Oratoire des Âmes-du-Purgatoire de La Chalpe (Oratory of the Souls of Purgatory in La Chalpe)	Bessans	La Chalpe	Oratory of the Souls of Purgatory	Registered	1996	
Oratoire Notre-Dame de l'Arcelette (Oratory of Notre-Dame in Arcelette)	Bessans	L'Arcelette Vallée d'Averolle	Oratory of Notre-Dame	Registered	1996	
Oratoire Notre-Dame de l'Arcelle (Oratory of Notre-Dame in Arcelle)	Bessans	L'Arcelle Vallée d'Averolle	Oratory of Notre-Dame	Registered	1996	
Oratoire Notre-Dame des Fossas	Bessans	Les Fossas	Oratory of Notre-Dame	Registered	1996	
Oratoire Saint-Antoine du Bechet (Oratory of Saint-Antoine in Béchet)	Bessans	Le Béchet Vallée d'Averolle	Oratory of Saint-Antoine	Registered	1996	
Oratoire Saint-Antoine de l'Envers (Oratory of Saint-Antoine in Envers)	Bessans	L'Envers La Lombarde	Oratory of Saint-Antoine	Registered	1996	
Oratoire Sainte-Anne de l'Arcelle (Oratory of Sainte-Anne in Arcelle)	Bessans	L'Arcelle Vallée de Ribon	Oratory of Sainte-Anne	Registered	1996	
Oratoire Sainte-Anne de Bessans (Oratory of Sainte-Anne in Bessans)	Bessans	Vallée de Ribon	Oratory of Sainte-Anne	Registered	1996	
Oratoire Sainte-Anne de Plates de Sainte-Anne (Oratory of Sainte-Anne in Plates de Sainte-Anne)	Bessans	Plates de Sainte-Anne	Oratory of Sainte-Anne	Registered	1996	
Oratoire Sainte-Catherine de Sainte-Catherine (Oratory of Sainte-Catherine in Sainte-Catherine)	Bessans	Sainte-Catherine La Goulaz	Oratory of Sainte-Catherine	Registered	1996	
Oratoire de la Sainte-Famille de La Chapelle (Oratory of Sainte-Famille in La Chapelle)	Bessans	La Chapelle	Oratory of Sainte-Famille	Registered	1996	
Oratoire Saint-Ignace de Derrière Saint-Ignace (Oratory of Saint-Ignace in Derrière Saint-Ignace)	Bessans	Derrière Saint-Ignace Vallée d'Averolle	Oratory of Saint-Ignace	Registered	1996	
Oratoire Saint-Jean-Baptiste de La Richardière (Oratory in Saint-Jean-Baptiste in La Richardière)	Bessans	La Richardière Au-dessus des Vincendières Vallée d'Averolle	Oratory in Saint-Jean-Baptiste	Registered	1996	
Oratoire Saint-Joseph de La Laveresse (Oratory of Saint-Joseph in La Laveresse)	Bessans	La Laveresse La Goulaz	Oratory of Saint-Joseph	Registered	1996	
Château du Bettonnet (Bettonnet Castle)	Betton-Bettonet		Bettonnet Castle	Registered	1996	
Bloc cupulaire de La Guettaz (Cupular block in La Guettaz)	Billième	La Guettaz	Cupular block	Classified	1939	
Bloc cupulaire de Lachat (Cupular block in Lachat)	Billième	Lachat	Cupular block	Classified	1939	
Blocs cupulaires de La Roche (Cupular blocks in La Roche)	Billième	La Roche	Cupular blocks	Classified	1939	
Bloc cupulaire de Santourin (Cupular block in Santourin)	Billième	Santourin	Cupular block	Classified	1939	
Blocs cupulaires du Rocher (Cupular blocks in Rocher)	Billième	Au Rocher	Cupular blocks	Classified	1939	
Chapelle Notre-Dame-des-Grâces de Bonneval-sur-Arc (Notre-Dame-des-Grâces chapel in Bonneval-sur-Arc)	Bonneval-sur-Arc		Notre-Dame-des-Grâces chapel	Registered	1980	
Chapelle Saint-Antoine de Bonneval-sur-Arc (Saint-Antoine chapel in Bonneval-sur-Arc)	Bonneval-sur-Arc		Saint-Antoine chapel	Registered	1980	
Chapelle Saint-Barthélemy de Bonneval-sur-Arc (Saint-Barthélemy chapel in Bonneval-sur-Arc)	Bonneval-sur-Arc	Vallon de la Lonta	Saint-Barthélemy chapel	Registered	1980	
Chapelle Sainte-Marguerite de Bonneval-sur-Arc (Sainte-Marguerite chapel in Bonneval-sur-Arc)	Bonneval-sur-Arc	L'Écot	Sainte-Marguerite chapel	Registered	1980	
Chapelle Saint-Sébastien de Bonneval-sur-Arc (Saint-Sébastien chapel in Bonneval-sur-Arc)	Bonneval-sur-Arc		Saint-Sébastien chapel	Registered	1980	
Église Notre-Dame-de-l'Assomption de Bonneval-sur-Arc (Notre-Dame-de-l'Assomption church in Bonneval-sur-Arc)	Bonneval-sur-Arc		Notre-Dame-de-l'Assomption church	Registered	1972	
Oratoire Notre-Dame-des-Sept-Douleurs de L'Écot (Oratory of Notre-Dame-des-Sept-Douleurs in L'Écot)	Bonneval-sur-Arc	L'Écot	Oratory of Notre-Dame-des-Sept-Douleurs	Registered	1980	
Oratoire de la Sainte-Trinité de Bonneval-sur-Arc (Oratory of Sainte-Trinité in Bonneval-sur-Arc)	Bonneval-sur-Arc		Oratory of Sainte-Trinité	Registered	1980	
Oratoire Saint-Gras de Bonneval-sur-Arc (Oratory of Saint-Gras in Bonneval-sur-Arc)	Bonneval-sur-Arc		Oratory of Saint-Gras	Registered	1980	
Oratoire Saint-Landry de Bonneval-sur-Arc (Oratory of Saint-Landry in Bonneval-sur-Arc)	Bonneval-sur-Arc	Route de l'Écot	Oratory of Saint-Landry	Registered	1980	
Oratoire Saint-Sébastien de Bonneval-sur-Arc (Oratory of Saint-Sébastien in Bonneval sur Arc)	Bonneval-sur-Arc		Oratory of Saint-Sébastien	Registered	1980	
Vieux Pont et Pont de la Lame (Old Bridge and Lame Bridge)	Bonneval-sur-Arc		Old Bridge and Lame Bridge	Registered	1980	
Château de la Serraz (Serraz Castle)	Le Bourget-du-Lac		Serraz Castle	Registered Registered	1989 2007	
Château du Bourget (Bourget Castle)	Le Bourget-du-Lac		Bourget Castle	Classified	1983	
Église Saint-Laurent du Bourget-du-Lac (Sainte-Laurent church in Bourget-du-Lac)	Le Bourget-du-Lac		Sainte-Laurent church	Classified	1900	
Prieuré du Bourget (Bourget Priory)	Le Bourget-du-Lac	Route de Chambéry	Bourget Priory	Classified Registered	1910 2006	
Chapelle Saint-Grat de Vulmix (Saint-Grat chapel in Vulnix)	Bourg-Saint-Maurice	Vulnix	Saint-Grat chapel	Classified Registered	1995 1995	
Église Saint-Pierre d'Extravache (Saint-Pierre d'Extravache church)	Bramans		Saint-Pierre d'Extravache church	Registered	1966	
Site archéologique de Grésine au Lac du Bourget (Grésine archaeological site at Lac du Bourget)	Brison-Saint-Innocent		Grésine archaeological site	Classified	2011	
Tunnel de Brison (Brison tunnel)	Brison-Saint-Innocent		Brison tunnel	Registered	1984	
Église Saint-Nicolas de Cevins (Saint-Nicolas church in Cevins)	Cevins		Saint-Nicolas church	Registered	1976	
Collégiale Saint-Marcel de La Chambre (Saint-Marcel de La Chambre collegiate church)	La Chambre		Saint-Marcel de La Chambre collegiate church	Classified	1939	
Église Saint-Maurice de Chamousset (Saint-Maurice church in Chamousset)	Chamousset		Saint-Maurice church	Classified	1950	
Tunnel hydraulique du Gelon et pont Royal de Chamousset (Gelon hydraulic tunnel and Chamousset Royal Bridge)	Chamousset		Gelon hydraulic tunnel and Chamousset Royal Bridge	Registered	1986	
Château de Chamoux (Castle in Chamoux)	Chamoux-sur-Gelon		Castle in Chamoux	Registered	1977	
Maison forte de Chanaz (Chanaz fortified house)	Chanaz		Chanaz fortified house	Registered	1980	
Ferme de Villarivon (Villarivon Farm)	Les Chapelles	Villarivon	Villarivon Farm	Registered	2006	
Pont Morens (Morens Bridge)	La Chavanne		Morens Bridge	Registered	1985	
Tours de Chignin (Chignin Towers)	Chignin		Chignin Towers	Registered	1991	
Château de Châtillon (Châtillon Castle)	Chindrieux		Châtillon Castle	Registered	1991	
Site archéologique de Châtillonau Lac du Bourget (Châtillonau archeological site Lac du Bourget)	Chindrieux		Châtillonau archeological site Lac du Bourget	Classified	2011	
Église Saint-Jean-Baptiste de Cléry (Saint-Jean-Baptiste church in Cléry)	Cléry		Saint-Jean-Baptiste church	Classified	1930	
Château de Martinel (Martinel church)	Cognin		Martinel church	Registered	1986	
Église Saint-Jean-Baptiste de Saint-Jean-Pied-Gauthier (Saint-Jean-Baptiste church in Saint-Jean-Pied-Gauthier)	Coise-Saint-Jean-Pied-Gauthier	Saint-Jean-Pied-Gauthier	Saint-Jean-Baptiste church in Saint-Jean-Pied-Gauthier	Registered	1932	
Site archéologique de Conjux-le-Port au Lac du Bourget (Conjux-le-Port archaeological site on Lac du Bourget)	Conjux		Conjux-le-Port archaeological site	Classified	2011	
Église Saint-Bon de Saint-Bon-Tarentaise (Saint-Bon church in Saint-Bon-Tarentaise)	Courchevel	Saint-Bon-Tarentaise	Saint-Bon church	Registered	1972	
Chalet Joliot-Curie	Courchevel	Courchevel1850 Rue de Bellecôte	Chalet Joliot-Curie	Registered	2005	
Chalet le Petit Navire	Courchevel	Courchevel1850 Rue des Chenus	Chalet le Petit Navire	Registered	2005	
Chapelle Notre-Dame-de-l'Assomption de Courchevel (Notre-Dame-de-l'Assomption chapel in Courchevel)	Courchevel	Courchevel1850 Les Tovets Rue de l'Église	Notre-Dame-de-l'Assomption chapel	Registered	2005	
Grenier La Goupille (La Goupille attic)	Courchevel	Courchevel1850 Bellecôte Lotissement des Greniers	La Goupille attic	Registered	2006	
Chalet Lang	Courchevel	Courchevel1850 Rue de Bellecôte	Chalet Lang	Registered	2012	
Pont Victor-Emmanuel (Victor-Emmanuel Bridge)	Cruet		Victor-Emmanuel Bridge	Registered	1994	
Hôtel de ville des Échelles	Les Échelles		Hôtel de ville des Échelles	Registered	1930	
Maison (House)	Les Échelles	Rue Stendhal	House	Registered	1930	
Vieux moulin aux Teppaz (Old mill at Teppaz)	Entremont-le-Vieux Saint-Pierre-d'Entremont		Old mill at Teppaz	Registered	2015	
Chapelle Notre-Dame-de-la-Salette de Fontcouverte (Notre-Dame-de-la-Salette chapel)	Fontcouverte-la-Toussuire		Notre-Dame-de-la-Salette chapel	Classified	1992	
Chapelle Notre-Dame-de-la-Visitation du Villard (Notre-Dame-de-la-Visitation chapel in Villard)	Fontcouverte-la-Toussuire	Le Villard	Notre-Dame-de-la-Visitation chapel	Registered	1990	
Église de l'Assomption de Fontcouverte-la Toussuire (Assumption church in Fontcouverte-la-Toussuire)	Fontcouverte-la-Toussuire		Assumption church	Registered	1990	
Tunnel ferroviaire du Fréjus (Fréjus rail tunnel)	Fourneaux		Fréjus rail tunnel	Registered	1926	
Château de Carron (Carron Castle)	Francin		Carron Castle	Registered	1989	
Villa gallo-romaine de Champ Bouchard (Gallo-Roman villa at Champ Bouchard)	Gilly-sur-Isère	Champ Bouchard	Gallo-Roman villa	Registered	1984	
Église Saint-Martin de Villargerel (Saint-Martin church in Villargerel)	Grand-Aigueblanche	Aigueblanche	Saint-Martin church	Classified	1943	
Château de Loche (Loche Castle)	Grésy-sur-Aix		Loche Castle	Registered	1964	
Église Saint-Étienne de Hautecour (Saint-Étienne church in Hautecour)	Hautecour		Saint-Étienne church	Registered	1971	
Chapelle Notre-Dame-de-Belleville (Notre-Dame-de-Belleville chapel)	Hauteluce		Notre-Dame-de-Belleville chapel	Classified	1938	
Église Saint-Jacques d'Hauteluce (Saint-Jacques church in Hauteluce)	Hauteluce		Saint-Jacques church in Hauteluce	Classified	1943	
Chapelle Notre-Dame-des-Grâces de Jarrier (Notre-Dame-des-Grâces chapel in Jarrier)	Jarrier	Cheloup	Notre-Dame-des-Grâces chapel	Classified	1992	
Église Saint-Pierre de Jarrier (Saint-Pierre church in Jarrier)	Jarrier		Saint-Pierre church	Registered	1990	
Blocs cupulaires de Follioules (Follioules cupular blocks)	Jongieux	Follioules	Follioules cupular blocks	Classified	1939	
Église Saint-Michel de Landry (Saint-Michel church in Landry)	Landry		Saint-Michel church	Registered	1975	
Église de l'Assomption-de-la-Vierge de Lanslebourg-Mont-Cenis (Assumption-de-la-Vierge church in Lanslebourg-Mont-Cenis)	Lanslebourg-Mont-Cenis		Assumption-de-la-Vierge church	Registered	1952	
Église Notre-Dame-de-l'Assomption de Lanslebourg-Mont-Cenis (Notre-Dame-de-l'Assomption church in Lanslebourg-Mont-Cenis)	Lanslebourg-Mont-Cenis		Notre-Dame-de-l'Assomption church	Classified	1991	
Chapelle de la Madeleine du Collet (Madeleine chapel in Le Collet)	Lanslevillard (Val-Cenis)	Le Collet	Madeleine chapel	Registered	1994	
Chapelle Notre-Dame-de-la-Salette des Glières (Notre-Dame-de-la-Salette chapel in Les Glières)	Lanslevillard (Val-Cenis)	Les Glières	Notre-Dame-de-la-Salette chapel	Registered	1994	
Chapelle Saint-Antoine de La Fesse d'en Haut (Saint-Antoine chapel in La Fesse d'en Haut)	Lanslevillard (Val-Cenis)	La Fesse d'en Haut	Saint-Antoine chapel	Registered	1994	
Chapelle Sainte-Agathe de l'Arcelle Neuve (Sainte-Agathe chapel in Arcelle Neuve)	Lanslevillard (Val-Cenis)	L'Arcelle Neuve	Sainte-Agathe chapel	Registered	1994	
Chapelle Sainte-Anne de Lanslevillard l'Adroit (Sainte-Anne chapel in Lanlevillard l'Adroit)	Lanslevillard (Val-Cenis)	Lanslevillard l'Adroit	Sainte-Anne chapel	Registered	1994	
Chapelle Saint-Étienne de Saint-Étienne (Saint-Étienne chapel in Saint-Étienne)	Lanslevillard (Val-Cenis)	Saint-Étienne	Saint-Étienne chapel	Registered	1994	
Chapelle Saint-Genix de Saint-Genix (Saint-Genix chapel in Saint-Genix)	Lanslevillard (Val-Cenis)	Saint-Genix	Saint-Genix chapel	Registered	1994	
Chapelle Saint-Jean-Baptiste de Saint-Jean-Baptiste (Saint-Jean-Baptiste chapel in Saint-Jean-Baptiste)	Lanslevillard (Val-Cenis)	Saint-Jean-Baptiste	Saint-Jean-Baptiste chapel	Registered	1994	
Chapelle Saint-Laurent de Saint-Laurent (Saint-Laurent chapel in Saint-Laurent)	Lanslevillard (Val-Cenis)	Saint-Laurent	Saint-Laurent chapel	Registered	1994	
Chapelle Saint-Pierre de Saint-Pierre (Saint-Pierre chapel in Saint-Pierre)	Lanslevillard (Val-Cenis)	Saint-Pierre	Saint-Pierre chapel	Registered	1994	
Chapelle Saint-Roch de Lanslevillard Envers (Saint-Roch chapel in Lanslevillard)	Lanslevillard (Val-Cenis)	Lanslevillard Envers	Saint-Roch chapel	Registered	1994	
Chapelle Saint-Sébastien de Lanslevillard (Saint-Sébastien chapel in Lanslevillard)	Lanslevillard (Val-Cenis)	Rue des Rochers	Saint-Sébastien chapel	Classified	1897	
Église Saint-Michel de Lanslevillard (Saint-Michel church in Lanslevillard)	Lanslevillard (Val-Cenis)	Place de l'Église	Saint-Michel church	Classified	1991	
Pierre de Chantelouve (Chatelouve stone)	Lanslevillard (Val-Cenis)		Chatelouve stone	Classified	1911	
Pont sur l'Arcelle Neuve (Bridge over Arcelle Neuve)	Lanslevillard (Val-Cenis)	Saint-Pierre	Bridge over Arcelle Neuve	Registered	1994	
Rocher aux Pieds	Lanslevillard (Val-Cenis)		Rocher aux Pieds	Classified	1911	
Église Saint-André de Doucy (Saint-André church in Doucy)	La Léchère	Doucy	Saint-André church	Classified	1991	
Dolmen de Mâcot-la-Plagne	Mâcot-la-Plagne (La Plagne Tarentaise)	Nantfrozin	Dolmen de Mâcot-la-Plagne	Classified	1911	
Église Saint-Jean-Baptiste de Marthod (Saint-Jean-Baptiste church in Marthod)	Marthod		Saint-Jean-Baptiste church	Classified	1950	
Taillanderie Busillet	Marthod	L'Epignier	Taillanderie Busillet	Registered	1995	
Château de Chevron (Chevron Castle)	Mercury		Chevron Castle	Registered	1982	
Fontaine en granit de Modane (Modane granite fountain)	Modane	Rue de l'Église	Modane granite fountain	Registered	1951	
Rizerie des Alpes	Modane	Place du Marché	Rizerie des Alpes	Registered	1987	
Motte castrale de Montailleur	Montailleur	Le Château	Motte castrale de Montailleur	Registered	1989	
Chapelle Notre-Dame de Beaurevers (Notre-Dame de Beaurevers chapel)	Montaimont (Saint-François-Longchamp)		Notre-Dame de Beaurevers chapel	Registered	1987	
Église Saint-Théodule de Montgellafrey (Saint-Théodule de Montgellafrey church)	Montgellafrey (Saint-François-Longchamp)		Saint-Théodule de Montgellafrey church	Registered	1994	
Hôtel de ville de Montmélian	Montmélian		Hôtel de ville de Montmélian	Registered	1949	
Pont Morens (Morens Bridge)	Montmélian		Morens Bridge	Registered	1985	
Église Saint-Barthélémy de Montsapey (Saint-Berthélémy church in Montsapey)	Montsapey		Saint-Berthélémy church	Registered Classified	1986 1988	
Tour de la Cure (Cure Tower)	Montvalezan		Cure Tower	Registered	1983	
Château Reinach (Reinach Castle)	La Motte-Servolex		Reinach Castle	Registered	2003	
Église Saint-Jean-Baptiste de La Motte-Servolex (Saint-Jean-Baptiste church in La Motte-Servolex)	La Motte-Servolex		Saint-Jean-Baptiste church	Registered Classified	1944 1984	
Cathédrale Saint-Pierre de Moûtiers (Saint-Pierre Cathedral in Moûtiers)	Moûtiers	Place Saint-Pierre	Saint-Pierre Cathedral	Classified Registered Classified	1906 2014 2015	
Palais épiscopal de Tarentaise (Tarentaise Episcopal Palace)	Moûtiers		Tarentaise Episcopal Palace	Classified Registered	1980 1980	
Vieux-Pont (Old Bridge)	Moûtiers		Old Bridge	Classified	1980	
Site archéologique du Gojat et Lac d'Aiguebelette (Gojat archaeological site and Lac d'Aiguebelette)	Novalaise		Gojat archaeological site and Lac d'Aiguebelette	Classified Classified	2011 2015	
Église de La Trinité de Peisey-Nancroix (La Trinité church in Peisey-Nancroix)	Peisey-Nancroix		La Trinité church	Registered	1972	
Mine de Pont-Baudin (Pont-Baudin mine)	Peisey-Nancroix	Pont-Baudin	Pont-Baudin mine	Registered	1990	
Sanctuaire de Notre-Dame des Vernettes (Sanctuary of Notre-Dame des Vernettes)	Peisey-Nancroix		Sanctuary of Notre-Dame des Vernettes	Registered	1983	
Église Saint-Michel de Montpascal (Saint-Michel church in Montpascal)	Pontamafrey-Montpascal		Saint-Michel church	Registered	2015	
Église des Carmes du Pont-de-Beauvoisin (Carmes church in Pont-de-Beauvoisin)	Le Pont-de-Beauvoisin		Carmes church	Classified	1992	
Maison Rivoire (Rivoire House)	Le Pont-de-Beauvoisin	Rue de l'Hôtel-de-Ville	Rivoire House	Registered	1991	
Maison forte du Grand Mercoras (Grand Mercoras fortified house)	Ruffieux		Grand Mercoras fortified house	Registered	1969	
Oratoire Notre-Dame-de-Bon-Secours de Saint-Alban-Leysse (Oratory of Notre-Dame-de-Bon-Secours in Saint-Alban-Leysse)	Saint-Alban-Leysse		Oratory of Notre-Dame-de-Bon-Secours	Registered	1936	
Église Notre-Dame du Villard (Notre-Dame church in Villard)	Saint-André	Le Villard	Notre-Dame church	Registered	2015	
Maison de l'Évêque (Bishop's House)	Saint-André	La Paraz	Bishop's House]	Registered	1998	
Château de Saint-Béron (Saint-Béron Castle)	Saint-Béron		Saint-Béron Castle]	Registered	1987	
Monument à Charles-Emmanuel II de Savoie (Monument to Charles-Emmanuel II of Savoy)	Saint-Christophe		Monument to Charles-Emmanuel II of Savoy	Registered	1952	
Chapelle Sainte-Brigitte de Sainte-Foy-Tarentaise (Sainte-Brigitte chapel in Sainte-Foy-Tarentaise)	Sainte-Foy-Tarentaise	Le Miroir	Sainte-Brigitte chapel	Registered	1992	
Château de Sainte-Hélène-sur-Isère (Saint-Hélène-sur-Isère Castle)	Sainte-Hélène-sur-Isère		Saint-Hélène-sur-Isère Castle	Registered	1940	
Église Notre-Dame-de-l'Assomption de Sainte-Marie-de-Cuines (Notre-Dame-de-l'Assumption church in Sainte-Marie-de-Cuines)	Sainte-Marie-de-Cuines		Notre-Dame-de-l'Assumption church	Registered	1949	
Abri de Saint-Jean-d'Arvey (Saint-Jean-d'Arvey shelter)	Saint-Jean-d'Arvey	Mont Peney	Saint-Jean-d'Arvey shelter	Classified	1974	
Château de La Forest (La Forest Castle)	Saint-Jean-de-Chevelu		La Forest Castle	Registered	1995	
Cathédrale Saint-Jean-Baptiste de Saint-Jean-de-Maurienne (Saint-Jean-Baptiste Cathedral in Saint-Jean-de-Maurienne)	Saint-Jean-de-Maurienne		Saint-Jean-Baptiste Cathedral	Classified	1906	
Cloître de Saint-Jean-de-Maurienne (Saint-Jean-de-Maurienne cloister)	Saint-Jean-de-Maurienne		Saint-Jean-de-Maurienne cloister	Classified Registered	1899 1933	
Église Notre-Dame de Saint-Jean-de-Maurienne (Notre-Dame church in Saint-Jean-de-Maurienne)	Saint-Jean-de-Maurienne	Place de la Cathédrale	Notre-Dame church	Classified	1966	
Maison de Babylone (Babylon House)	Saint-Jean-de-Maurienne	105 rue du Collège	Babylon House	Registered	1992	
Palais épiscopal de Saint-Jean-de-Maurienne (Episcopal Palace of Saint-Jean-de-Maurienne)	Saint-Jean-de-Maurienne		Episcopal Palace of Saint-Jean-de-Maurienne	Classified	1984	
Tour de la Correrie (Correrie Tower)	Saint-Jean-de-Maurienne	Rue de la République	Correrie Tower	Registered	2012	
Église Saint-Georges du Prieuré (Saint-Georges church in Prieuré)	Saint-Jeoire-Prieuré	Le Prieuré	Saint-Georges church	Registered	1952	
Pierre à cupules de Pré Nouveau (Cupule stone from Pré Nouveau)	Saint-Michel-de-Maurienne	Pré Nouveau	Cupule stone from Pré Nouveau	Classified	1954	
Église Saint-Nicolas (Saint-Nicolas church)	Saint-Nicolas-la-Chapelle		Saint-Nicolas church	Registered	1989	
Château de Miolans (Miolans Castle)	Saint-Pierre-d'Albigny		Miolans Castle	Classified	1944	
Abbaye d'Hautecombe (Hautecombe Abbey)	Saint-Pierre-de-Curtille		Hautecombe Abbey	Classified	1875	
Site archéologique de Hautecombeet Lac du Bourget (Hautecombe archaeological site and Lac du Bourget)	Saint-Pierre-de-Curtille		Hautecombe archaeological site and Lac du Bourget	Classified	2011	
Chapelle des Dix-Mille-Martyrs de Saint-Pierre-d'Entremont (Dix-Mille-Martyrs chapel in Saint-Pierre-d'Entremont)	Saint-Pierre-d'Entremont		Dix-Mille-Martyrs chapel	Classified	1928	
Ancienne mairie de Saint-Sorlin-d'Arves (Former Saint-Sorlin-d'Arves town hall)	Saint-Sorlin-d'Arves		Former Saint-Sorlin-d'Arves town hall	Registered	2004	
Chapelle Notre-Dame-de-la-Paix des Prés-Plans (Notre-Dame-de-la-Paix chapel in Prés-Plans)	Saint-Sorlin-d'Arves	Les Prés-Plans	Notre-Dame-de-la-Paix chapel	Registered	2004	
Chapelle Saint-Jean-Baptiste de Saint-Sorlin-d'Arves (Saint-Jean-Baptiste chapel in Saint-Sorlin-d'Arves)	Saint-Sorlin-d'Arves		Saint-Jean-Baptiste chapel	Registered	2004	
Chapelle Saint-Joseph de Saint-Sorlin-d'Arves (Saint-Joseph chapel in Saint-Sorlin-d'Arves)	Saint-Sorlin-d'Arves		Saint-Joseph chapel	Registered	2004	
Chapelle Saint-Pierre de Saint-Sorlin-d'Arves (Saint-Pierre chapel in Saint-Sorlin-d'Arves)	Saint-Sorlin-d'Arves		Saint-Pierre chapel	Registered	2004	
Cimetière de Saint-Sorlin-d'Arves (Saint-Sorlin-d'Arves cemetery)	Saint-Sorlin-d'Arves		Saint-Sorlin-d'Arves cemetery	Registered	2004	
Croix du col de la Croix de Fer	Saint-Sorlin-d'Arves		Croix du col de la Croix de Fer	Registered	2004	
Croix de la Troche (Troche cross)	Saint-Sorlin-d'Arves	Chemin des Prés-Plans	Troche cross	Registered	2004	
Église Saint-Saturnin de Saint-Sorlin-d'Arves (Saint-Saturnin church in Saint-Sorlin-d'Arves)	Saint-Sorlin-d'Arves		Saint-Saturnin church	Registered	2004	
Oratoire de la Tour (Oratory of the Tower)	Saint-Sorlin-d'Arves		Oratory of the Tower	Registered	2004	
Cercle de pierres de Séez (Séez stone circle)	Séez	Col du Petit-Saint-Bernard	Séez stone circle	Classified	1956	
Rocher et grotte des Balmes (Balmes rock and cave)	Sollières-Sardières	Le Muleney Les Balmes	Balmes rock and cave	Classified	1978	
Château de Sonnaz (Sonnaz Castle)	Sonnaz	Route du Crêt	Sonnaz Castle	Registered	1979	
Chapelle Notre-Dame-de-la-Visitation de Termignon (Notre-Dame-de-la-Visitation chapel in Termignon)	Termignon		Notre-Dame-de-la-Visitation chapel	Classified	1987	
Église Notre-Dame-de-l'Assomption de Termignon (Notre-Dame-de-l'Assomption church in Termignon)	Termignon (Val-Cenis)		Notre-Dame-de-l'Assomption church	Registered	1986	
Monument aux morts de Termignon (Termignon war memorial)	Termignon (Val-Cenis)		Termignon war memorial	Registered	2019	
Tour du Châtel (Châtel tower)	La Tour-en-Maurienne	Le Châtel	Châtel tower	Classified	1900	
Site archéologique du Saut et Lac du Bourget (Le Saut archaeological site and Lac du Bourget)	Tresserve		Le Saut archaeological site and Lac du Bourget	Classified	2011	
Chalet de la Grande Ourse	Val-d'Isère	Rue des Leissières	Chalet de la Grande Ourse	Registered	1994	
Église Saint-Bernard-des-Alpes de Val-d'Isère (Saint-Bernard-des-Alpes church in Val-d'Isère)	Val-d'Isère		Saint-Bernard-des-Alpes church	Registered	1951	
Église Notre-Dame-de-l'Assomption de Valloire (Notre-Dame-de-l'Assumption church in Valloire)	Valloire		Notre-Dame-de-l'Assumption church	Classified	1945	
Château de Montmayeur (Montmayeur Castle)	Villard-Sallet		Montmayeur Castle	Registered	1989	
Église Saint-Pierre du Bourget (Saint-Pierre church in Le Bourget)	Villarodin-Bourget	Le Bourget	Saint-Pierre church	Classified	1984	
Église Notre-Dame d'Yenne (Notre-Dame d'Yenne church)	Yenne		Notre-Dame d'Yenne church	Classified	1987	

== See also ==
- Monument historique
