= Aime-la-Plagne =

- Commune
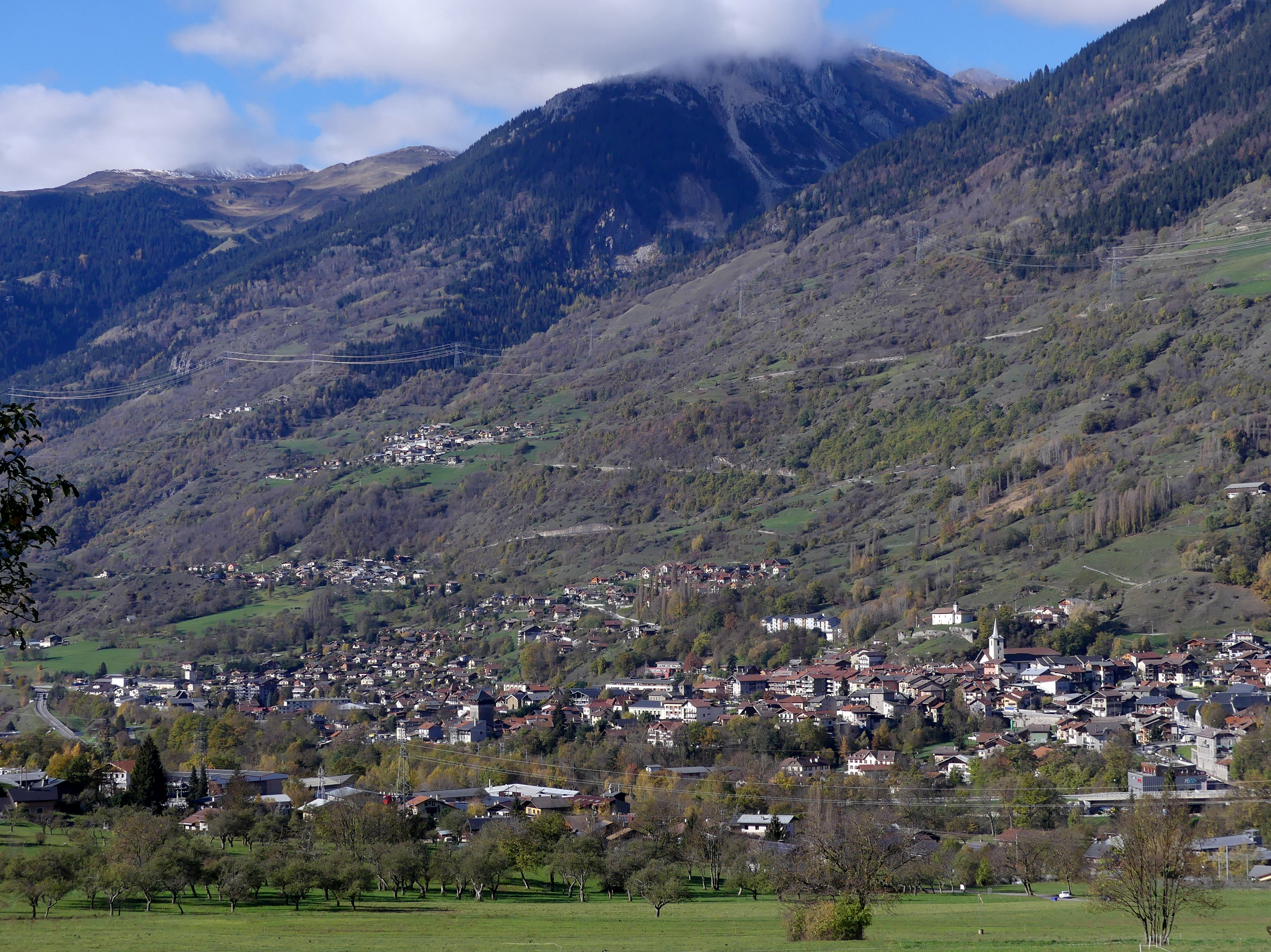
- A general view of Aime-la-Plagne

- Coat of arms
- Location of Aime-la-Plagne
- Location within France Location within Auvergne-Rhône-Alpes
- Coordinates: 45°33′25″N 6°39′07″E
- Country: France
- Region: Auvergne-Rhône-Alpes
- Department: Savoie
- Arrondissement: Albertville
- Canton: Bourg-Saint-Maurice
- Intercommunality: Les Versants d'Aime

Government
  - Mayor (2020–2026): Corine Maironi-Gonthier
- Area^{1}: 94.67 km^{2} (36.55 sq mi)
- Population (2023): 4,385
  - Density: 46.32/km^{2} (120.0/sq mi)
- Time zone: UTC+01:00 (CET)
  - Summer (DST): UTC+02:00 (CEST)
- INSEE/Postal code: 73006 /73210
- ^{1} French Land Register data, which excludes lakes, ponds, glaciers > 1 km^{2} (0.386 sq mi or 247 acres) and river estuaries.

Aime-la-Plagne (French pronunciation: [ɛm la plaɲ]) is a commune in the Savoie department of southeastern France. The municipality was established on 1 January 2016 and consists of the former communes of Aime, Granier and Montgirod.

Its most well known mayor was Pierre Borrione, who created the local ski resort and historical society.

== History ==
=== Mining activities ===
Mining concessions in the area were first granted in the 1850s and 1860s. The concession of Planamont was granted by imperial decree in 1868. Until the end of the 19th century, mining operations were limited to outcrop deposits. In 1914, the Société civile des mines d'anthracite d'Aime 'Aime Anthracite Mines Partnership' was founed, and mining operations became more substantial.

Throughout the beginning of the 20th century, the coal mining industry in Aime displaced traditional pastoral settlement patterns in favor of mining communites, especially as demand for coal increased during World War I. Despite the inferior quality of the coal extracted, the opening of the railway to Bourg-Saint-Maurice in 1914 bolstered the position of local mines within the Savoie market, somewhat displacing anthracite extracted in La Mure; however, the mining industry primarily benefitted the lower-lying communes where coal processing took place, rather than the areas where it was extracted. The commune of Aime saw its population grow 21% between the 1911 and 1921 censuses, while the populations of the surrounding communes of Côte-d'Aime, Valezan, Longefoy, and Tessens each fell during this period. Between 1920 and 1939, production underwent significant growth, reaching about 1,000 tons per month.

From 1921 until 1934, ground movements had affected homes in the commune of Montgilbert, forcing the operator to limit expansion and diversify exploration in other areas. Mining operations at the Planamont site ceased in 1940, with 250,000 tons of minerals having been extracted from the concessions in total.

=== Ski resort ===
By the late 1950s, the broader economy of the Tarentaise Valley was in crisis, as the majority of mines had closed, and developments in agriculture had rendered traditional Alpine farms obsolete. In 1959, Aime mayor Pierre Borrione authored a report on the local economy in order to attract the attention of public authorities. Borrione wrote that the canton was "rich but populated by the poor" and proposed the development of a resort town as a means to save the increasingly depopulated communes of the valley.

In 1960, following Borrione's iniative, four communes (Aime, Bellentre, Mâcot and Longefoy) created the Syndicat intercommunal de La Grande Plagne ('La Grand Plagne Intermunicipal Association'). Works began in 1961 with the awarding of a 2.2 million franc contract to construct the 16 km access road, half of which was paid by the communes and the other half through loans. The resulting La Plagne resort became the archetypal example of a French "third-generation" resort town (French: station de troisième génération), in which a ski resort is developed ex nihilo from a previously empty tract of land.

=== Merger ===
On 17 November 2015, a prefectural order was issued merging the communes of Aime, Granier and Montgirod into the new commune of Aime-la-Plagne, with its chef-lieu in Aime. The order took effect on 1 January 2016.

== Population ==
Population data refer to the area corresponding with the commune as of January 2025.

Historical population
Year	Pop.	±% p.a.
1968	3,183	—
1975	3,222	+0.17%
1982	3,358	+0.59%
1990	3,679	+1.15%
1999	3,916	+0.70%
2007	4,168	+0.78%
2012	4,382	+1.01%
2017	4,443	+0.28%
2023	4,385	−0.22%
Source: INSEE

== See also ==
- Communes of the Savoie department
