= Bellentre =

Bellentre Bélintro (Savoyard)
- Part of La Plagne Tarentaise
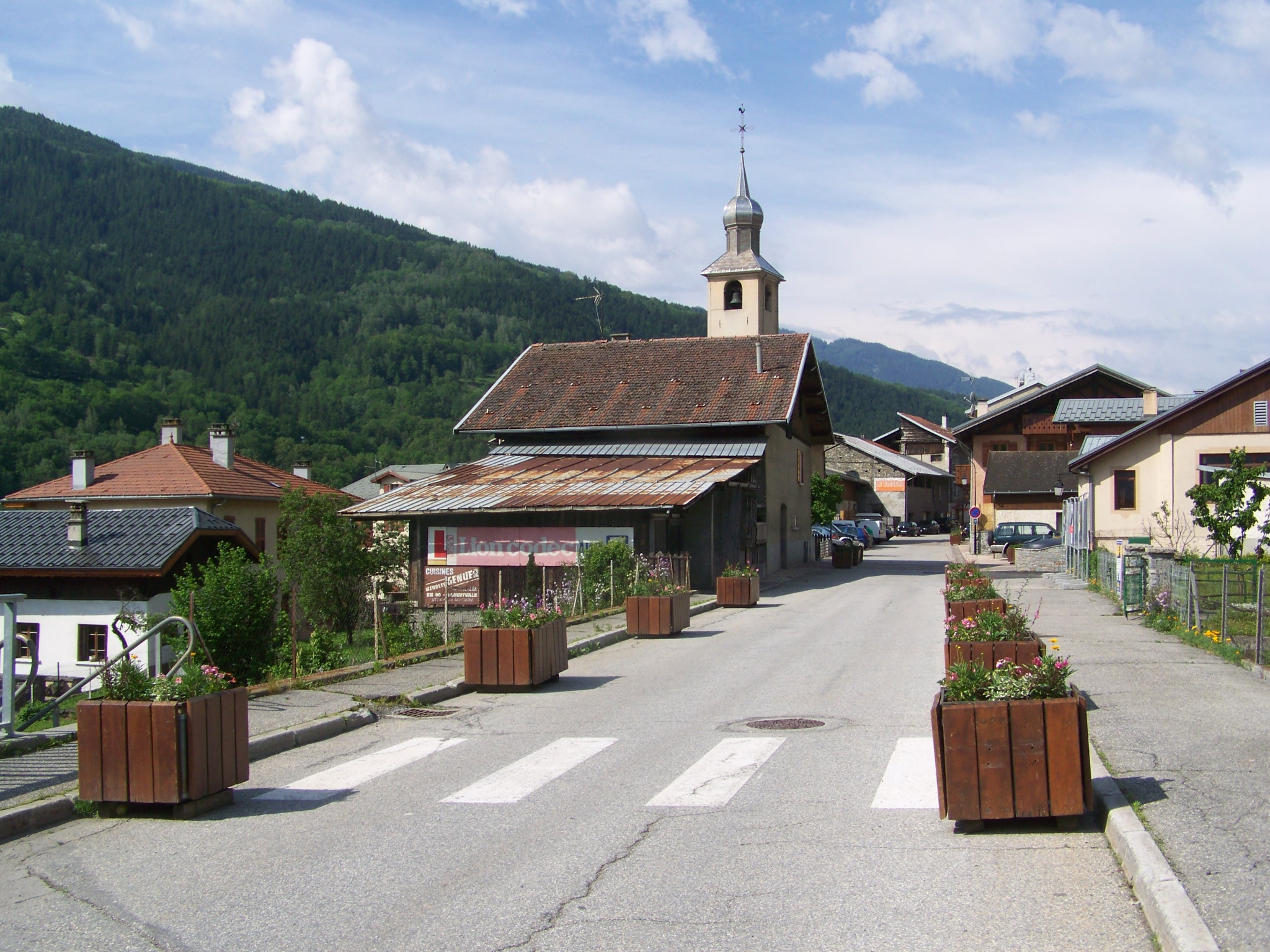
- The church in Bellentre
- Location of Bellentre
- Location within France Location within Auvergne-Rhône-Alpes
- Coordinates: 45°34′14″N 6°42′52″E
- Country: France
- Region: Auvergne-Rhône-Alpes
- Department: Savoie
- Arrondissement: Albertville
- Canton: Bourg-Saint-Maurice
- Commune: La Plagne Tarentaise
- Area^{1}: 23.94 km^{2} (9.24 sq mi)
- Elevation: 743 m (2,438 ft)
- Highest elevation: 3,011 m (9,879 ft)
- Lowest elevation: 699 m (2,293 ft)
- Population (2022): 919
  - Density: 38.4/km^{2} (99.4/sq mi)
- Time zone: UTC+01:00 (CET)
  - Summer (DST): UTC+02:00 (CEST)
- Postal code: 73210
- ^{1} French Land Register data, which excludes lakes, ponds, glaciers > 1 km^{2} (0.386 sq mi or 247 acres) and river estuaries.

Bellentre (French pronunciation: [bɛlɑ̃tʁ]; Savoyard: Bélintro) is a former commune in the Savoie department in the region of Auvergne-Rhône-Alpes in south-eastern France. On 1 January 2016, it was merged into the new commune of La Plagne Tarentaise.

== Geography ==
Situated in the Tarentaise Valley, the commune stretches over the villages of Montchavin Les Coches and parts of the ski resort of La Plagne.

Neighbouring communes are Landry to the north-east, Les Chapelles, Bourg-Saint-Maurice and Valezan to the north, Mâcot-la-Plagne to the west, Champagny-en-Vanoise to the south and Peisey-Nancroix to the east.

== See also ==
- Communes of the Savoie department
