= Mâcot-la-Plagne =

Mâcot-la-Plagne Makôte (Savoyard)
- Part of La Plagne Tarentaise
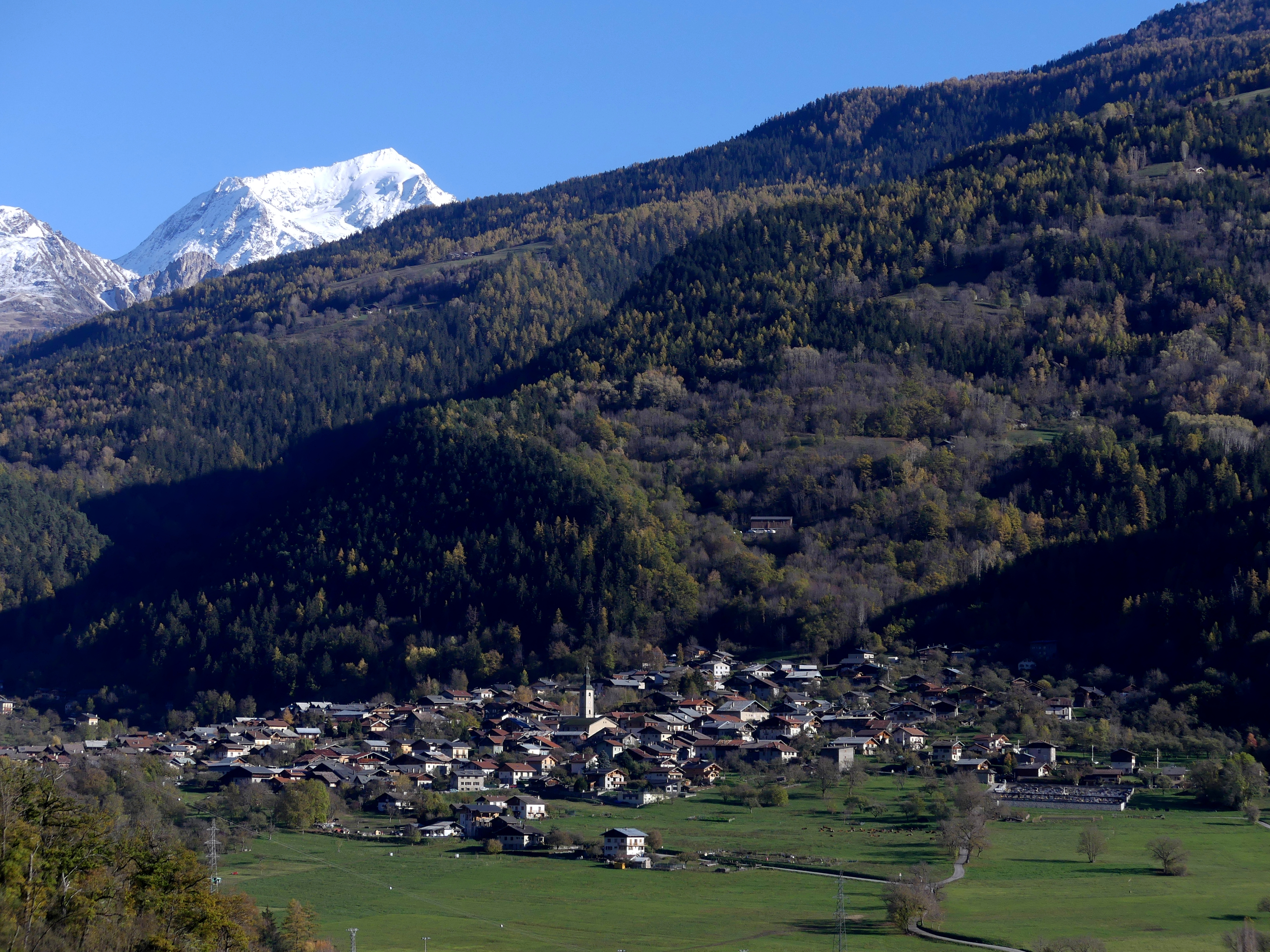
- Village of Mâcot
- Location of Mâcot-la-Plagne
- Location within France Location within Auvergne-Rhône-Alpes
- Coordinates: 45°33′16″N 6°40′22″E
- Country: France
- Region: Auvergne-Rhône-Alpes
- Department: Savoie
- Arrondissement: Albertville
- Canton: Bourg-Saint-Maurice
- Commune: La Plagne Tarentaise
- Area^{1}: 37.86 km^{2} (14.62 sq mi)
- Elevation: 760 m (2,490 ft)
- Highest elevation: 2,708 m (8,885 ft)
- Lowest elevation: 653 m (2,142 ft)
- Population (2022): 1,756
  - Density: 46.38/km^{2} (120.1/sq mi)
- Time zone: UTC+01:00 (CET)
  - Summer (DST): UTC+02:00 (CEST)
- Postal code: 73210
- ^{1} French Land Register data, which excludes lakes, ponds, glaciers > 1 km^{2} (0.386 sq mi or 247 acres) and river estuaries.

Mâcot-la-Plagne (French pronunciation: [mako la plaɲ]; before 1970: Mâcot; Savoyard: Makôte) is a former commune in the Savoie department in the Auvergne-Rhône-Alpes region in south-eastern France. On 1 January 2016, it was merged into the new commune of La Plagne Tarentaise.

== Geography ==
It gives its name to the French ski resort La Plagne, most of which lies within the commune of Mâcot-la-Plagne. It is bordered by the communes of Aime to the west, Bozel to the southwest, Champagny-en-Vanoise to the south, Bellentre to the east, and Valezan and La Côte-d'Aime to the north.

== Population ==
Historical population
Year	Pop.	±% p.a.
1962	1,072	—
1968	1,204	+1.95%
1975	1,112	−1.13%
1982	1,210	+1.21%
1990	1,621	+3.72%
1999	1,578	−0.30%
2006	1,731	+1.33%
2022	1,756	+0.09%
Source: EHESS and INSEE

== See also ==
- Communes of the Savoie department
