= Granier =

Granier Granyé (Savoyard)
- Part of Aime-la-Plagne
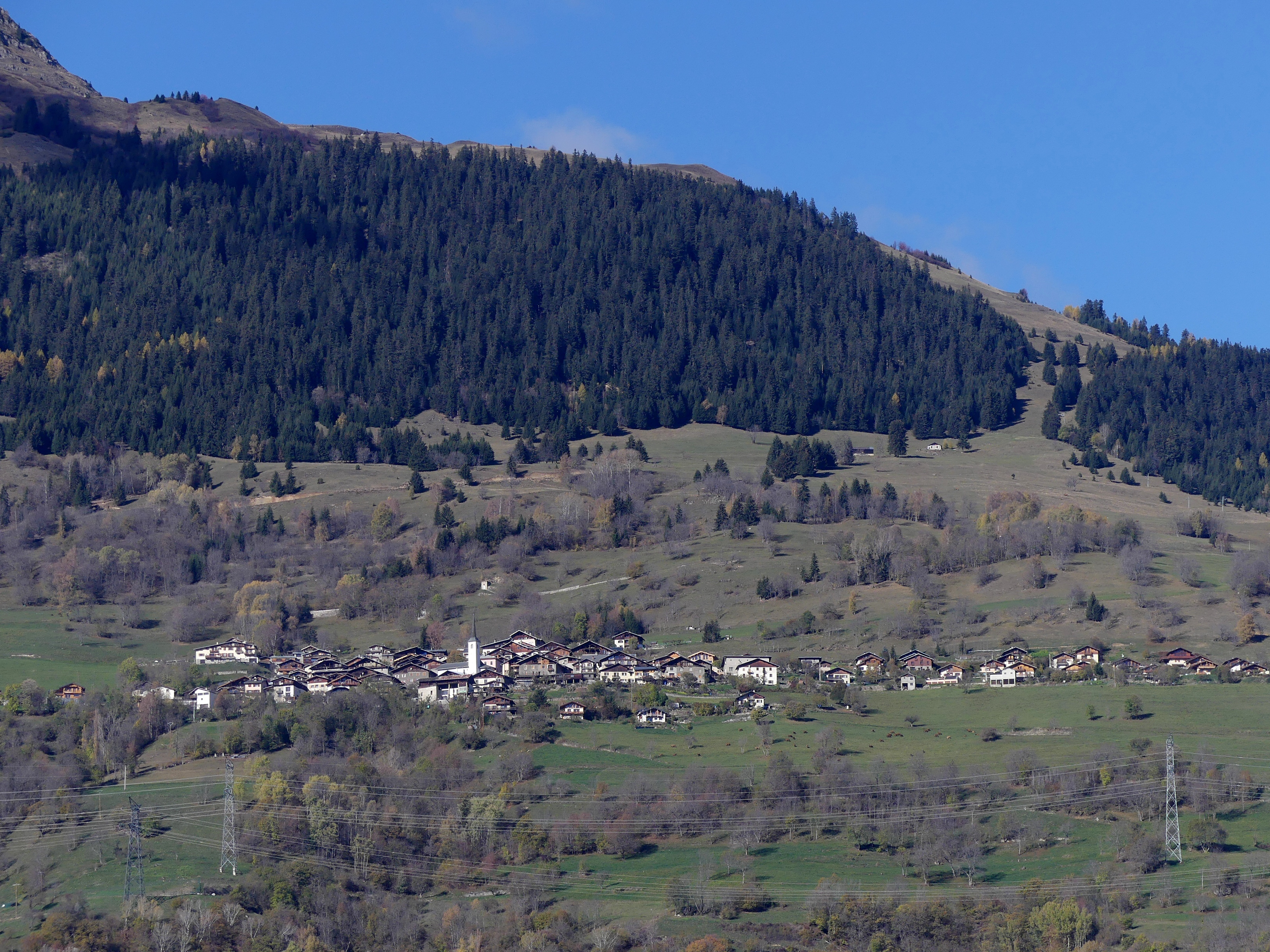
- Location of Granier
- Location within France Location within Auvergne-Rhône-Alpes
- Coordinates: 45°34′24″N 6°39′05″E
- Country: France
- Region: Auvergne-Rhône-Alpes
- Department: Savoie
- Arrondissement: Albertville
- Canton: Bourg-Saint-Maurice
- Commune: Aime-la-Plagne
- Area^{1}: 30.31 km^{2} (11.70 sq mi)
- Highest elevation: 2,700 m (8,900 ft)
- Lowest elevation: 832 m (2,730 ft)
- Population (2021): 342
  - Density: 11.3/km^{2} (29.2/sq mi)
- Time zone: UTC+01:00 (CET)
  - Summer (DST): UTC+02:00 (CEST)
- Postal code: 73210
- ^{1} French Land Register data, which excludes lakes, ponds, glaciers > 1 km^{2} (0.386 sq mi or 247 acres) and river estuaries.

Granier (French pronunciation: [ɡʁanje]; Savoyard: Granyé) is a former commune in the Savoie department in the Auvergne-Rhône-Alpes region in south-eastern France. On 1 January 2016, it was merged into the new commune of Aime-la-Plagne.

== Population ==
Historical population
| Year | Pop. | ±% p.a. |
|---|---|---|
| 2006 | 361 | — |
| 2011 | 366 | +0.28% |
| 2021 | 342 | −0.68% |
Source: INSEE

== See also ==
- Communes of the Savoie department
