= Montgirod =

Montgirod Montsou (Savoyard)
- Part of Aime-la-Plagne
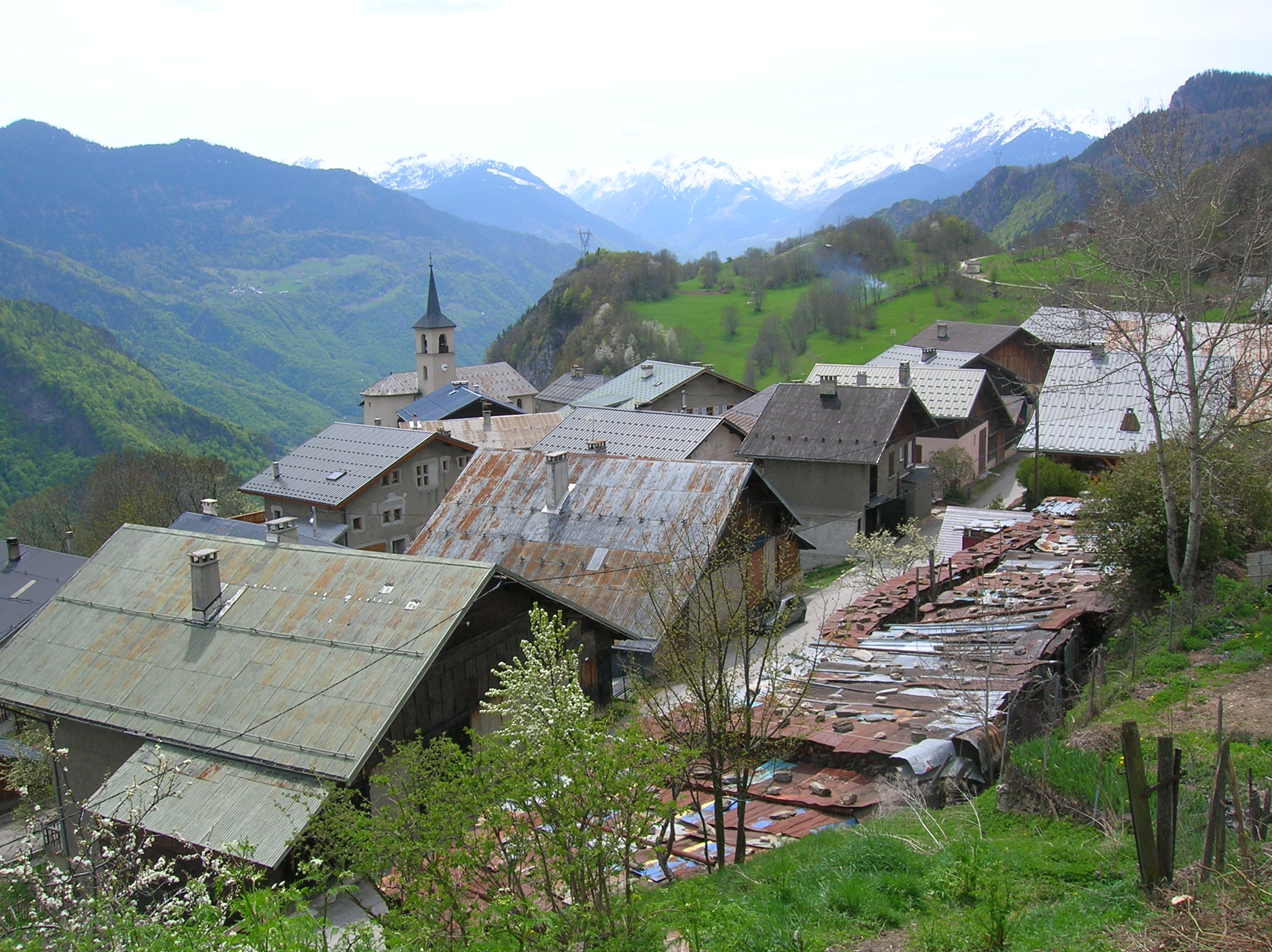
- A view across the rooftops to the church
- Location of Montgirod
- Location within France Location within Auvergne-Rhône-Alpes
- Coordinates: 45°32′00″N 6°35′00″E
- Country: France
- Region: Auvergne-Rhône-Alpes
- Department: Savoie
- Arrondissement: Albertville
- Canton: Bourg-Saint-Maurice
- Commune: Aime-la-Plagne
- Area^{1}: 13.62 km^{2} (5.26 sq mi)
- Highest elevation: 2,255 m (7,398 ft)
- Lowest elevation: 556 m (1,824 ft)
- Population (2021): 483
  - Density: 35.5/km^{2} (91.8/sq mi)
- Time zone: UTC+01:00 (CET)
  - Summer (DST): UTC+02:00 (CEST)
- Postal code: 73210
- Website: www.mairie-montgirod-centron.fr
- ^{1} French Land Register data, which excludes lakes, ponds, glaciers > 1 km^{2} (0.386 sq mi or 247 acres) and river estuaries.

Montgirod (French pronunciation: [mɔ̃ʒiʁo]; Savoyard: Montsou) is a former commune in the Savoie department in the Auvergne-Rhône-Alpes region in south-eastern France. On 1 January 2016, it was merged into the new commune of Aime-la-Plagne. In August 1994, its town hall square was renamed the "Place du Colonel Peter Ortiz", after U.S. Marine Corps officer Peter J. Ortiz.

== Population ==
Historical population
Year	Pop.	±% p.a.
2006	426	—
2011	450	+1.10%
2021	483	+0.71%
Source: INSEE

== See also ==
- Communes of the Savoie department
