= La Côte-d'Aime =

- Part of La Plagne Tarentaise
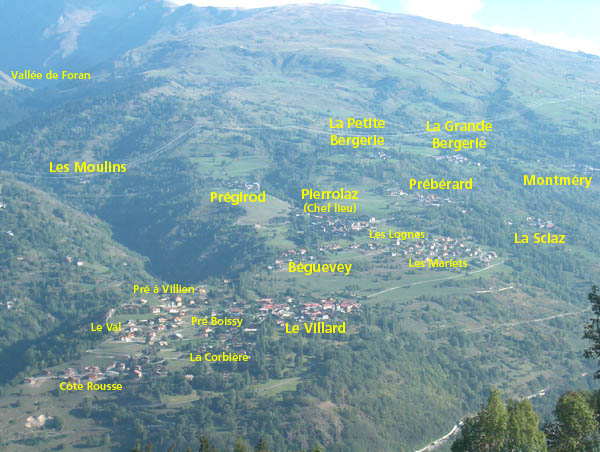
- A general view of La Côte-d'Aime
- Location of La Côte-d'Aime
- Location within France Location within Auvergne-Rhône-Alpes
- Coordinates: 45°34′07″N 6°40′10″E
- Country: France
- Region: Auvergne-Rhône-Alpes
- Department: Savoie
- Arrondissement: Albertville
- Canton: Bourg-Saint-Maurice
- Commune: La Plagne Tarentaise
- Area^{1}: 26.26 km^{2} (10.14 sq mi)
- Elevation: 980 m (3,220 ft)
- Highest elevation: 2,960 m (9,710 ft)
- Lowest elevation: 665 m (2,182 ft)
- Population (2022): 945
  - Density: 36.0/km^{2} (93.2/sq mi)
- Time zone: UTC+01:00 (CET)
  - Summer (DST): UTC+02:00 (CEST)
- Postal code: 73210
- Website: www.lacotedaime.com
- ^{1} French Land Register data, which excludes lakes, ponds, glaciers > 1 km^{2} (0.386 sq mi or 247 acres) and river estuaries.

La Côte-d'Aime (French pronunciation: [la kot dɛm], literally The Slope of Aime; Arpitan: La Kouha d’Éma) is a former commune in the Savoie department in the Auvergne-Rhône-Alpes region in south-eastern France. On 1 January 2016, it was merged into the new commune of La Plagne Tarentaise.

It lies in the heart of the Tarentaise valley.

== See also ==
- Communes of the Savoie department
