= Villaroger =

- Commune
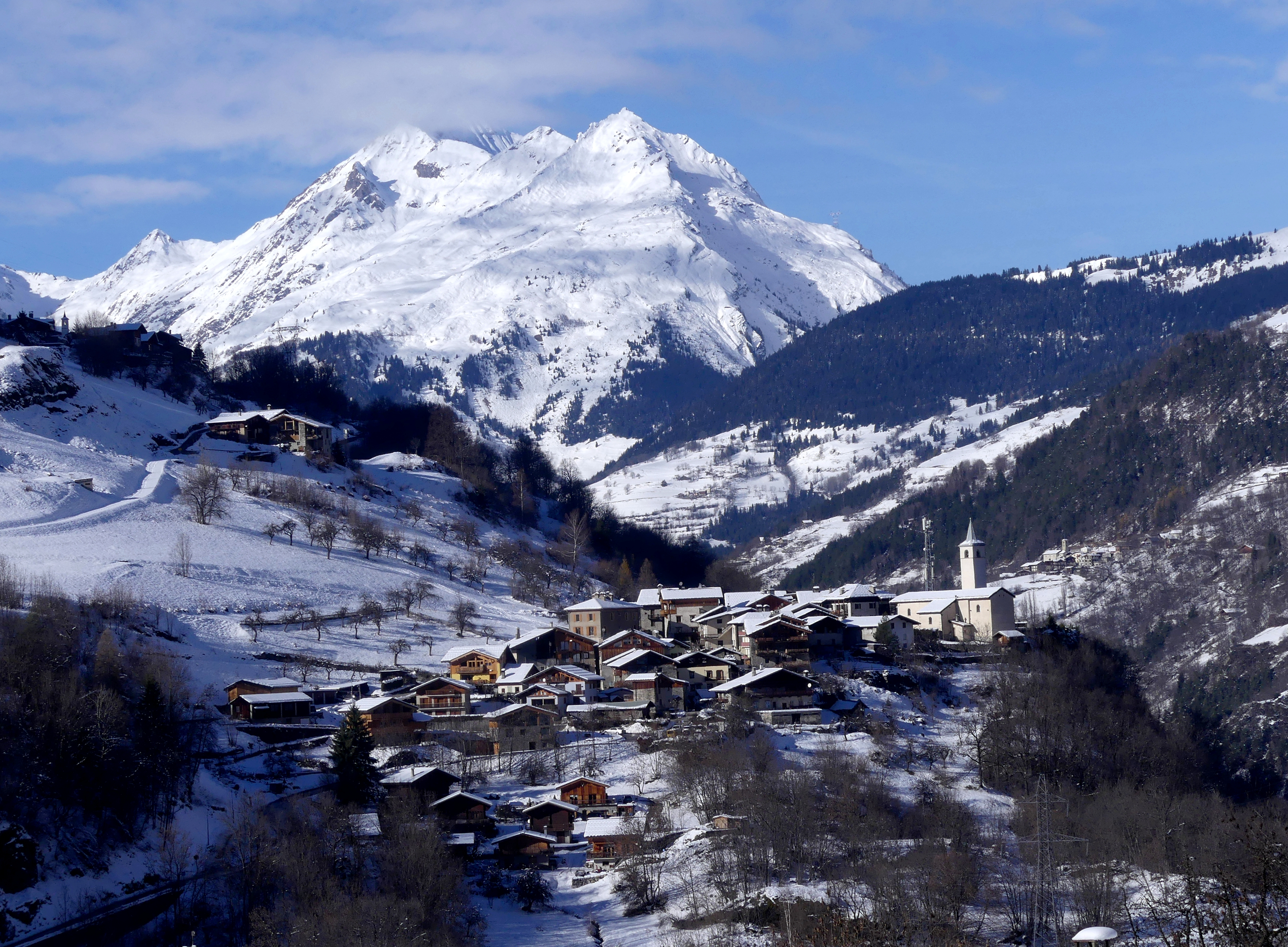
- Location of Villaroger
- Location within France Location within Auvergne-Rhône-Alpes
- Coordinates: 45°35′31″N 6°52′30″E
- Country: France
- Region: Auvergne-Rhône-Alpes
- Department: Savoie
- Arrondissement: Albertville
- Canton: Bourg-Saint-Maurice
- Intercommunality: Haute Tarentaise

Government
  - Mayor (2020–2026): Alain Emprin
- Area^{1}: 28.15 km^{2} (10.87 sq mi)
- Highest elevation: 3,779 m (12,398 ft)
- Lowest elevation: 859 m (2,818 ft)
- Population (2023): 355
  - Density: 12.6/km^{2} (32.7/sq mi)
- Time zone: UTC+01:00 (CET)
  - Summer (DST): UTC+02:00 (CEST)
- INSEE/Postal code: 73323 /73640
- ^{1} French Land Register data, which excludes lakes, ponds, glaciers > 1 km^{2} (0.386 sq mi or 247 acres) and river estuaries.

Villaroger is a commune in the Savoie department in the Auvergne-Rhône-Alpes region in south-eastern France. It is situated in the upper Tarentaise Valley, between Bourg-Saint-Maurice and Tignes.

The commune of Villaroger extends from 850m at the river Isère up to 3779m at the Mont Pourri. Villaroger is made up of several hamlets, the main village being at 1075m. The name Villaroger comes from “Villarium Ogerii” which indicates the existence of a villa during the Middle Ages, which belonged to a certain Oger or Ogier, a family name particularly common among the French during the 5th and the 6th centuries.

For years the main source of income has been farming and cheese production. In addition to these traditional ways of life, tourism now plays an important part. Villaroger has been linked to Les Arcs by a three man chairlift since 1982AD. Its geographical situation and landscape lends itself to numerous winter and summer activities.

== See also ==
- Communes of the Savoie department
