= La Plagne Tarentaise =

- Commune
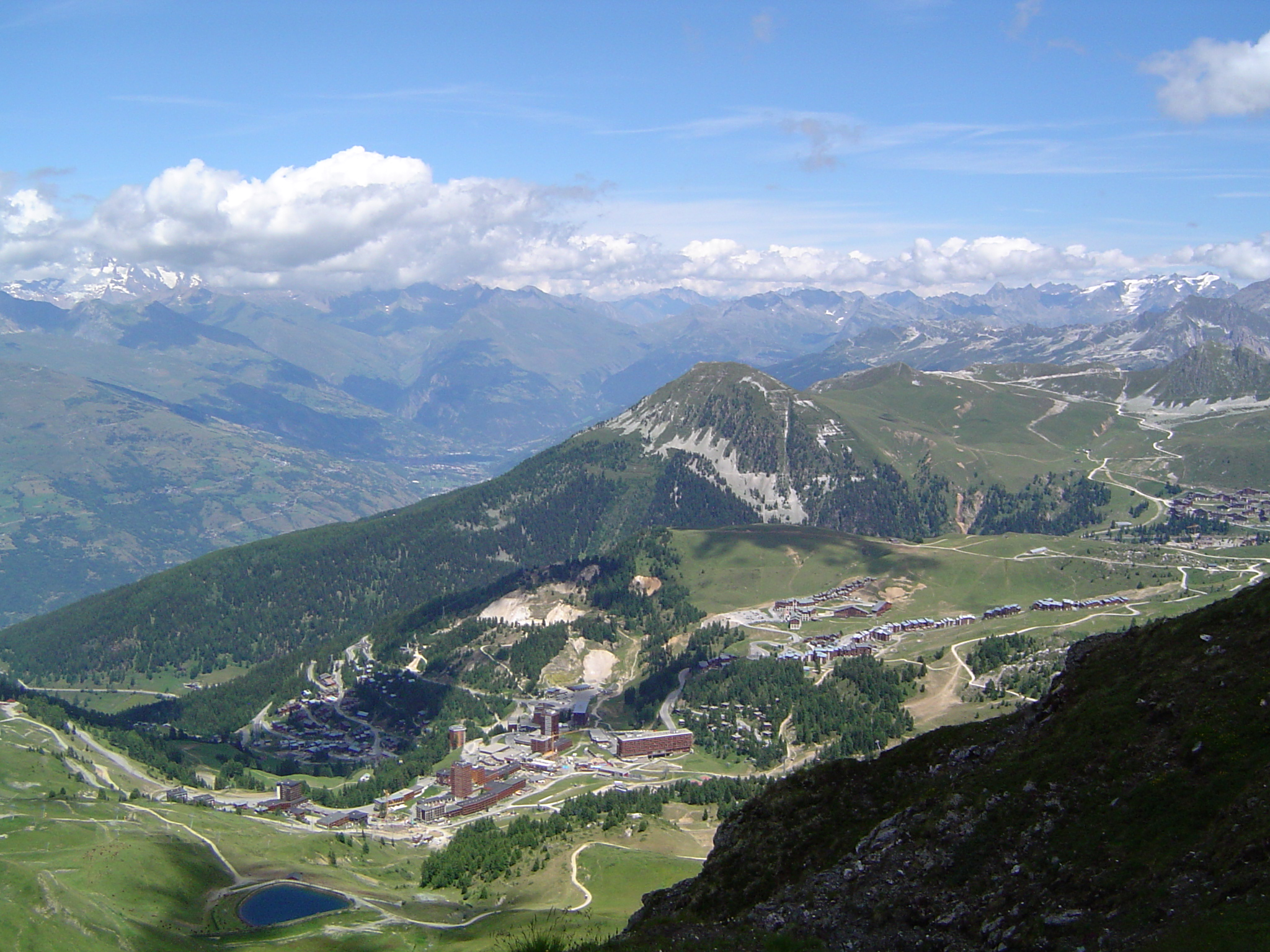
- A general view of La Plagne
- Location of La Plagne Tarentaise
- Location within France Location within Auvergne-Rhône-Alpes
- Coordinates: 45°33′11″N 6°40′19″E
- Country: France
- Region: Auvergne-Rhône-Alpes
- Department: Savoie
- Arrondissement: Albertville
- Canton: Bourg-Saint-Maurice

Government
  - Mayor (2020–2026): Jean-Luc Boch
- Area^{1}: 96.07 km^{2} (37.09 sq mi)
- Population (2023): 3,836
  - Density: 39.93/km^{2} (103.4/sq mi)
- Time zone: UTC+01:00 (CET)
  - Summer (DST): UTC+02:00 (CEST)
- INSEE/Postal code: 73150 /73210
- ^{1} French Land Register data, which excludes lakes, ponds, glaciers > 1 km^{2} (0.386 sq mi or 247 acres) and river estuaries.

La Plagne Tarentaise (French pronunciation: [la plaɲ taʁɑ̃tɛz]) is a commune in the Savoie department of southeastern France. The municipality was established on 1 January 2016 and consists of the former communes of Bellentre, La Côte-d'Aime, Mâcot-la-Plagne and Valezan.

== Population ==
Population data refer to the area corresponding with the commune as of January 2025.

Historical population
| Year | Pop. | ±% p.a. |
|---|---|---|
| 1968 | 2,483 | — |
| 1975 | 2,335 | −0.87% |
| 1982 | 2,522 | +1.11% |
| 1990 | 3,063 | +2.46% |
| 1999 | 3,189 | +0.45% |
| 2007 | 3,759 | +2.08% |
| 2012 | 3,859 | +0.53% |
| 2017 | 3,638 | −1.17% |
| 2023 | 3,836 | +0.89% |
Source: INSEE

== See also ==
- Communes of the Savoie department
