= Pierre Borrione =

French resistance fighter, doctor and archaeologist

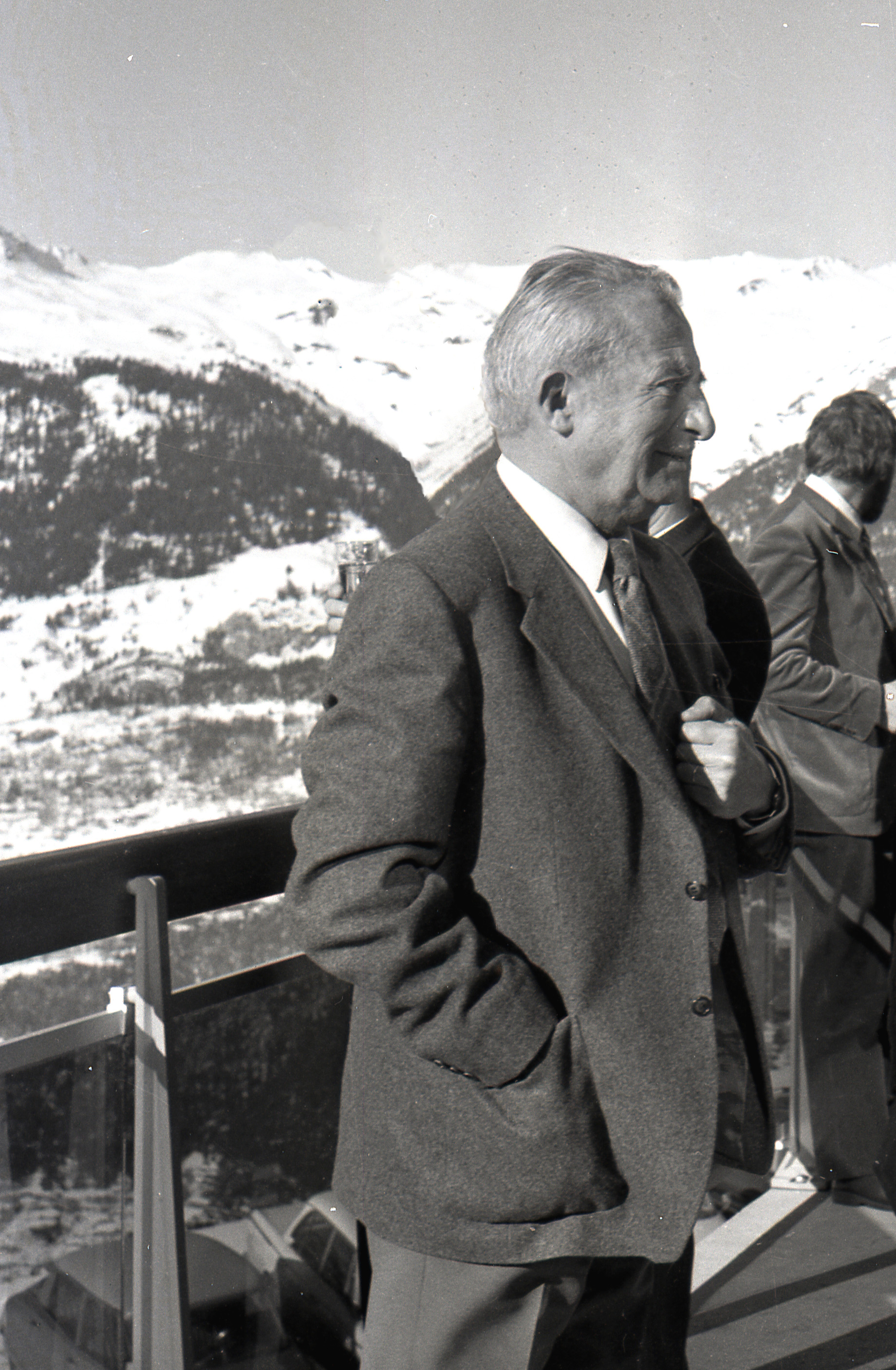
- Pierre Borrione in La Plagne (1970)
- Born: Francisque Pierre Joseph Borrione; 11 February 1913; Lyon, France
- Died: 2 May 1974 (aged 61); Aime, France
- Occupation: Doctor
- Known for: Creation of La Plagne

Pierre Borrione (11 February 1913 – 2 May 1974) was a French resistance fighter, medical doctor, archaeologist and local politician. He is known for creating the ski resort of La Plagne.

== Biography ==
During World War II, Pierre Borrione was active in the French Resistance in Aime, where he organized the local branch of the Marco Polo network. He cared for other resistance fighters and helped young people avoiding the Compulsory Labor Service, the so called STO. P. Borrione was awarded the French Resistance Medal

In 1953, Borrione was the first doctor in France to vaccinate the local population against polio with the new vaccine from the "Laboratoires Merieux".

Borrione was elected mayor of Aime in 1959. With the mining activity coming soon to an end, well aware of its impact on local employment, he launched the plan to turn the local alpine pastures into a large-scale winter sports area. To this end, he hired architect Michel Bezançon in 1960 and work relentlessly to convince the local and national authorities. Pierre Borrione is seen as the creator of La Plagne, which opened at the end of 1961 and expanded considerably in the decades that followed.

In his original plan, he imagined a connection to the nearby ski resort of Les Arcs. This became a reality in 2003 as the Vanoise Express joined the two ski resorts in what became Paradiski.

In 1968, Pierre Borrione conducted archeological excavations in Aime which led to the discovery of a significant number of Ancient Rome artifacts. He launched the local archeological society "Société d'Histoire et Archéologie d'Aime (SHAAIME)" which in turn, two years later, created the museum "Des Pierres et des Hommes" to make these artifacts available to the public.

== Bibliography ==
- Romain Guigon, Agnès Le Masson, "Une Histoire de La Plagne".Corlet Imprimeur, 2016. ISBN 978-2-37979-799-6
- Célestin Freppaz, "La Haute Tarentaise dans la tourmente: La guerre 1939-1945".Didier-Richard (Grenoble), 1979. ISBN 978-2-402-22780-3
