= Les Chapelles =

- Commune
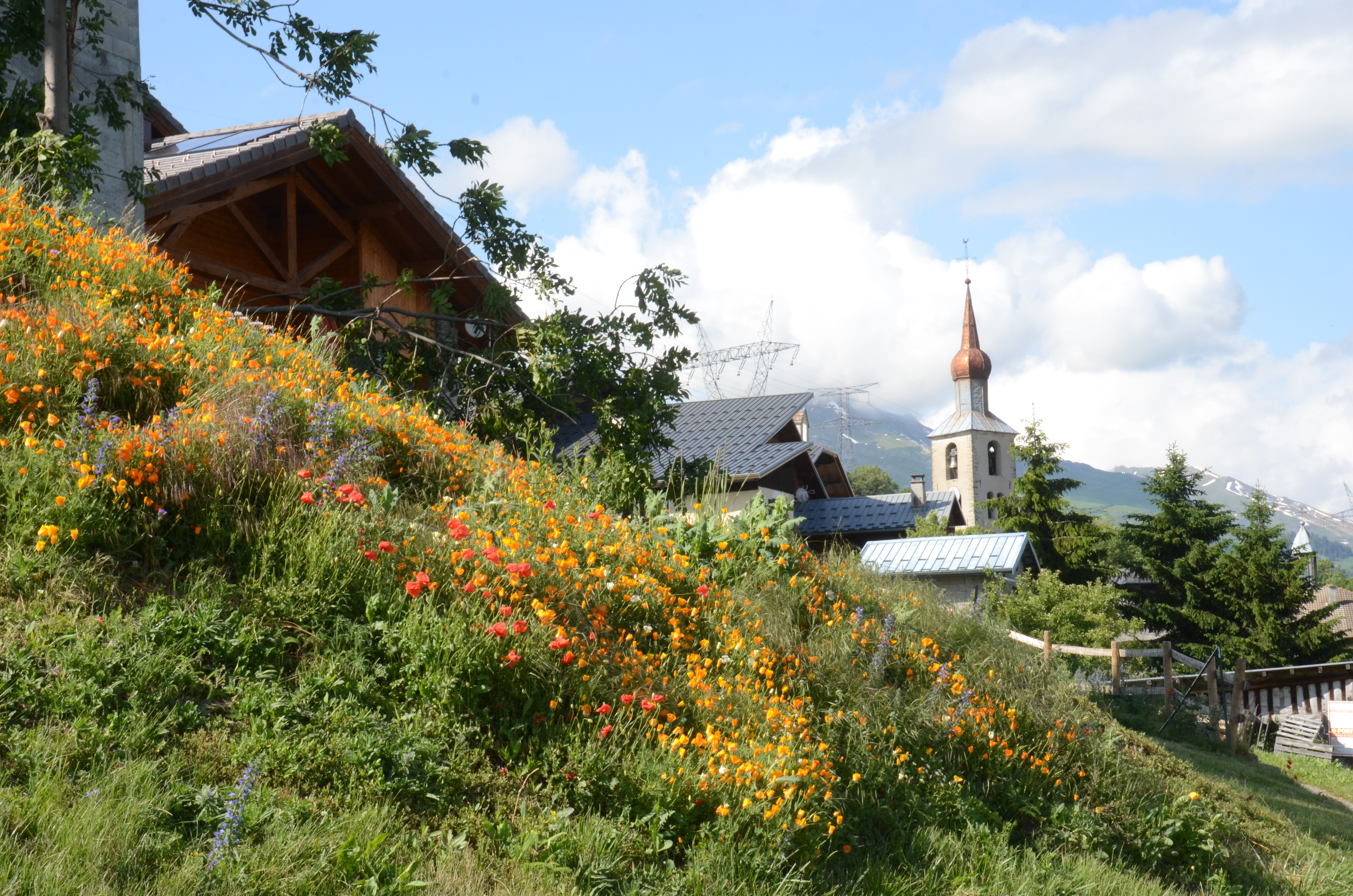
- Location of Les Chapelles
- Location within France Location within Auvergne-Rhône-Alpes
- Coordinates: 45°35′27″N 6°43′49″E
- Country: France
- Region: Auvergne-Rhône-Alpes
- Department: Savoie
- Arrondissement: Albertville
- Canton: Bourg-Saint-Maurice

Government
  - Mayor (2020–2026): Paul Pellecuer
- Area^{1}: 17.31 km^{2} (6.68 sq mi)
- Elevation: 1,280 m (4,200 ft)
- Highest elevation: 2,964 m (9,724 ft)
- Lowest elevation: 772 m (2,533 ft)
- Population (2023): 568
  - Density: 32.8/km^{2} (85.0/sq mi)
- Time zone: UTC+01:00 (CET)
  - Summer (DST): UTC+02:00 (CEST)
- INSEE/Postal code: 73077 /73700
- ^{1} French Land Register data, which excludes lakes, ponds, glaciers > 1 km^{2} (0.386 sq mi or 247 acres) and river estuaries.

Les Chapelles (French pronunciation: [le ʃapɛl]; Arpitan: Lé Tsapéle) is a commune in the Savoie department in the Auvergne-Rhône-Alpes region in south-eastern France.

== See also ==
- Communes of the Savoie department
