= Landry, Savoie =

Landry
- Commune
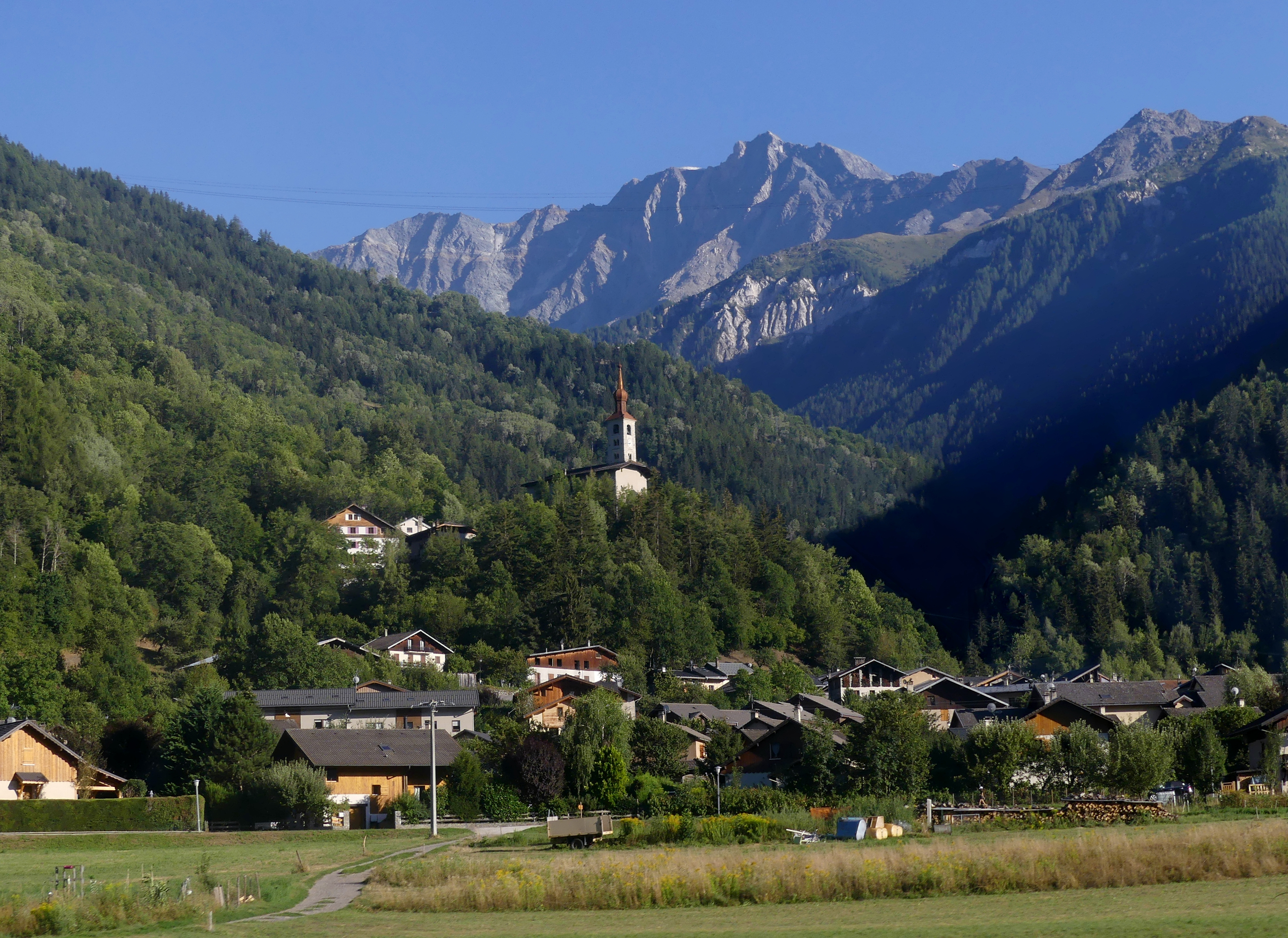
- Location of Landry
- Location within France Location within Auvergne-Rhône-Alpes
- Coordinates: 45°34′20″N 6°44′28″E
- Country: France
- Region: Auvergne-Rhône-Alpes
- Department: Savoie
- Arrondissement: Albertville
- Canton: Bourg-Saint-Maurice

Government
  - Mayor (2020–2026): Thierry Marchand-Maillet
- Area^{1}: 10.62 km^{2} (4.10 sq mi)
- Highest elevation: 2,680 m (8,790 ft)
- Lowest elevation: 724 m (2,375 ft)
- Population (2023): 813
  - Density: 76.6/km^{2} (198/sq mi)
- Time zone: UTC+01:00 (CET)
  - Summer (DST): UTC+02:00 (CEST)
- INSEE/Postal code: 73142 /73210
- Website: www.mairie-landry.com
- ^{1} French Land Register data, which excludes lakes, ponds, glaciers > 1 km^{2} (0.386 sq mi or 247 acres) and river estuaries.

Landry (French pronunciation: [lɑ̃dʁi]) is a commune in the Savoie department in the Auvergne-Rhône-Alpes region in south-eastern France. As of 2022, there are 810 inhabitants.

== Martorey ==
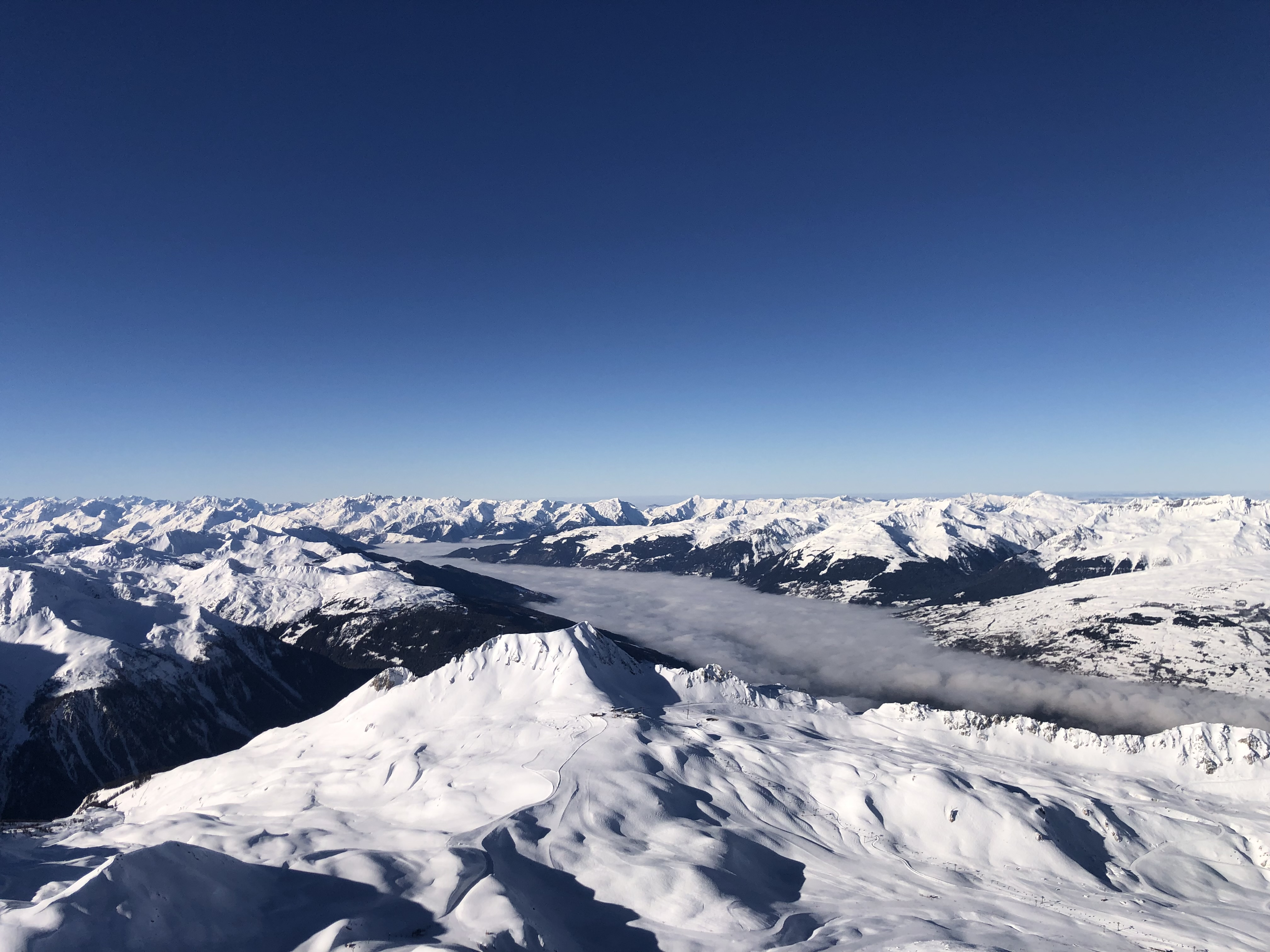
View of Landry valley (covered in clouds) from Aiguille Rouge

Martorey is a hamlet situated 1150 meters above the city of Landry. It features tourist accommodation built there in the 19th century as well as several chalets in stonework typical of the Savoy area.

== See also ==
- Communes of the Savoie department
