= Bessans =

Bessans Bèssanse (Savoyard)
- Commune
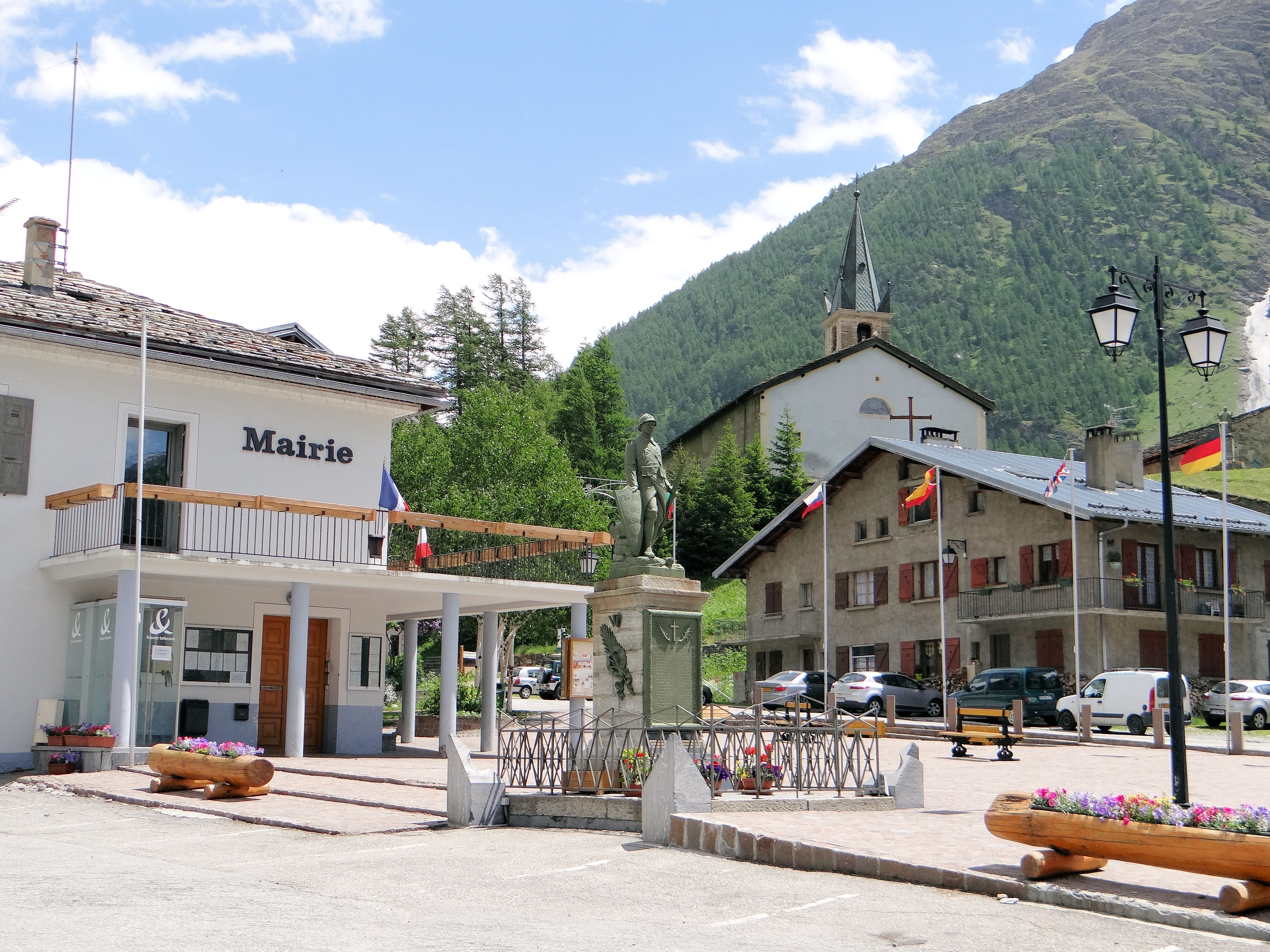
- The town hall, war memorial and church in Bessans

- Coat of arms
- Location of Bessans
- Location within France Location within Auvergne-Rhône-Alpes
- Coordinates: 45°19′N 7°00′E
- Country: France
- Region: Auvergne-Rhône-Alpes
- Department: Savoie
- Arrondissement: Saint-Jean-de-Maurienne
- Canton: Modane
- Intercommunality: Haute Maurienne-Vanoise

Government
  - Mayor (2020–2026): Jérémy Tracq
- Area^{1}: 154.01 km^{2} (59.46 sq mi)
- Elevation: 1,835 m (6,020 ft)
- Highest elevation: 3,752 m (12,310 ft)
- Lowest elevation: 1,673 m (5,489 ft)
- Population (2023): 341
  - Density: 2.21/km^{2} (5.73/sq mi)
- Time zone: UTC+01:00 (CET)
  - Summer (DST): UTC+02:00 (CEST)
- INSEE/Postal code: 73040 /73480
- ^{1} French Land Register data, which excludes lakes, ponds, glaciers > 1 km^{2} (0.386 sq mi or 247 acres) and river estuaries.

Bessans (Savoyard: Bèssanse) is a commune in the Savoie department in the Auvergne-Rhône-Alpes region in south-eastern France. It is located in the valley of Maurienne and crossed by the Arc river.

== Geography ==
Located on the Haute-Maurienne plateau, at an altitude of 1750 meters, the area is known for its sporting activities. Bessans is located in a valley, ideal for Nordic skiing. Following the collapse of the mountain downstream from Bessans (between 10000 and 3000 years BC), an ice-dammed lake formed. The successive sedimentary deposits have created the plateau on which Bessans is situated. The physical characteristics of the site are reinforced by an early and high-quality snow from November to April, and by sunny weather. These allow the team French Nordic skiing and Biathlon teams, as well as those of other nations to train in Bessans. There are numerous glaciers in the area (i.e. Albaron, Deep Sea, Large Pareis, Baounet), and nearby is the highest peak of the Maurienne (Charbonnel, 3752 m),

== Climate ==
Due to its altitude, Bessans features a subarctic climate (Dfc) under the Köppen system. Summers are short but surprisingly warm and sunny, including temperatures above 20 °C during the day while winters are severely cold and very snowy with almost no thawing conditions, even at the best of the day between December and February.

Climate data for Bessans (altitude 1731m, 1991–2020 normals, extremes 1984–present)
Month	Jan	Feb	Mar	Apr	May	Jun	Jul	Aug	Sep	Oct	Nov	Dec	Year
Record high °C (°F)	10.6 (51.1)	12.6 (54.7)	15.3 (59.5)	20.7 (69.3)	26.6 (79.9)	31.5 (88.7)	30.5 (86.9)	30.6 (87.1)	26.8 (80.2)	23.8 (74.8)	17.3 (63.1)	9.3 (48.7)	31.5 (88.7)
Mean daily maximum °C (°F)	−2.2 (28.0)	0.7 (33.3)	5.3 (41.5)	8.8 (47.8)	14.0 (57.2)	18.8 (65.8)	21.4 (70.5)	20.9 (69.6)	16.0 (60.8)	11.0 (51.8)	3.2 (37.8)	−1.7 (28.9)	9.7 (49.5)
Daily mean °C (°F)	−6.4 (20.5)	−5.0 (23.0)	−0.6 (30.9)	3.4 (38.1)	8.2 (46.8)	12.2 (54.0)	14.3 (57.7)	14.1 (57.4)	9.9 (49.8)	5.5 (41.9)	−0.9 (30.4)	−5.5 (22.1)	4.1 (39.4)
Mean daily minimum °C (°F)	−10.7 (12.7)	−10.6 (12.9)	−6.4 (20.5)	−2.0 (28.4)	2.4 (36.3)	5.6 (42.1)	7.3 (45.1)	7.3 (45.1)	3.8 (38.8)	0.0 (32.0)	−5.0 (23.0)	−9.2 (15.4)	−1.5 (29.3)
Record low °C (°F)	−31.0 (−23.8)	−29.0 (−20.2)	−25.8 (−14.4)	−16.0 (3.2)	−12.0 (10.4)	−3.5 (25.7)	−0.7 (30.7)	−2.9 (26.8)	−5.3 (22.5)	−14.4 (6.1)	−23.2 (−9.8)	−25.0 (−13.0)	−31.0 (−23.8)
Average precipitation mm (inches)	62.7 (2.47)	53.2 (2.09)	55.4 (2.18)	68.8 (2.71)	89.8 (3.54)	76.3 (3.00)	55.3 (2.18)	69.4 (2.73)	67.4 (2.65)	77.7 (3.06)	95.3 (3.75)	75.9 (2.99)	847.2 (33.35)
Average precipitation days (≥ 1 mm)	8.5	8.4	8.6	9.0	11.2	10.0	8.5	9.4	8.5	8.6	9.9	9.9	110.5
Source: Météo-France

== History ==
=== Neolithic era ===
The first traces of the human occupation are found in Haute-Maurienne. Close to Bessans, on the walls of the Rock of the Castle, one can see cave paintings representing a herd of stags, accompanied by other signs. Flint arrowheads and other evidence of early settlement were found at the foot of the rock at the time of recent excavations. It is also known that locally mined serpentinite was used to manufacture axes whose specimens were found with more than 200 km (120 mi) of the site.

=== Antiquity ===
The Celts occupied the area.

=== Middle Ages ===
574: the Merovingian King Gontran annexes Maurienne 10th century: Maurienne is subject to invasion. 11th century: Humbert I found the "House of Savoy". 1376: the church existed already has its current site.

=== Early modern ===
1532: the bishop of Maurienne sets up the parish of Bonneval, forming part of the commune of Bessans. 1576: restoration of the church of Bessans. 1578: Shroud of Turin is found in Bessans. 1600: the hamlet of Avérole is carried by an avalanche and is rebuilt with the current site. 1725: the priest of Bessans creates a public school. 1762: Bonneval separates from Bessans and becomes a commune with whole share. 1852: creation of the fair to the cattle which takes place in September. 1860: The annexation of Savoy by France is voted by plebiscite, as Savoy leaves the Kingdom of Sardinia: "Our hearts goes where our rivers go."

1869: building of a road between Lanslevillard and Bessans passing by the country cottages of the Madeleine and Chalp. End of the 19th century: 1110 inhabitants in Bessans, including 52 in Vincendières, 69 in Avérole, 30 in Goulaz and 73 in Villaron.

=== Twentieth century ===
1920: construction of the refuge of Avérole by the CIF. 1926: restoration of the church. 1937: inauguration of the road of the col de l'Iseran by the President of the Republic Albert Lebrun. 1940: On June 14, part of the population is evacuated. The Italian troops occupy Bessans and Avérole and plunder the village. Villaron, Goulaz and Bonneval are spared. 1944: the Germans set fire to Bessans, burning 150 houses, 1957: an enormous flood of the Arc River causes major damage in all the valley. The efforts of rebuilding after the war are partly destroyed. 1962: installation of a first ski-lift "Wire snows" on the initiative of the Ponce abbot 1963: creation of the National park of Vanoise. 1972: opening of the center of ski touring "Bessannaise". 1994: end of the restoration of the parish church.

== Administration ==
=== Mayors ===
- 1958-1971 Albert Cimaz
- 1971-1977 Maxime Gautier
- 1977-1983 Victor Personnaz
- 1983-1989 George Personnaz

== Architectural heritage ==
Prehistoric vestiges and ancient neolithic cave paintings with the "Rock of the Castle".

Civil Houses of the seventeenth and eighteenth centuries, with the roofs of roofing stones. Stones engraved on houses. This includes external murals from the seventeenth century on the "dead house" (after the novel of Henry Bordeaux carrying this title, and which describes in fictionalized form the life of Bessans in the nineteenth century). There is also a notable bridge on the Arc River.

=== The Saint-Anthony Vault ===
The Saint-Anthony vault forms part of a network of vaults, oratories and cross on the parochial territory of Bessans. It is a rectangular building built on the sandy spur which overhangs the village, parallel to the church. It dates from the beginning of fifteenth century. It was set up and decorated between 1503 and 1522. The principal frontage is protected by a hood which shelters external decoration, of the frescos representing the seven theological virtues followed from the dance from the defects connected by a chain drawn by two demons in direction from the hell. The bell-tower of the vault is assembled on the Western pinion and dominates a roof with double slope in roofing stones. This vault possessed a typical coffered ceiling of the Rebirth with polychrome paintings (1526). On the walls of the vault are forty panels representing the life of Jesus Christ, from the Nativity to Pentecost, in the same style as paintings of the Vault Saint-Sébastien de Lanslevillard. Painting is all done as frescos, painting with water on fresh mortar.

=== Saint-Jean-Baptist church ===
The Saint-Jean-Baptist Church is located near the vault Saint-Anthony, these two buildings being integrated in the "Ways of the Baroque". It is impossible to determine the date of its construction, but it is certain that it existed already in 1376; it underwent many changes over the centuries. Like all the churches High-Maurienne, it possessed a closed hall. The vault of this hall is decorated in plaster existing already in 1827 and representing the miracle with the Holy Host in Turin. At the interior of the church, eight arched windows introduce enough light to make it possible to contemplate the vault with medallions. The sight is first of all attracted by the high altar, whose marble is of a Carrara marble white, decorated of a Jean-Baptist Saint on the front, of fine facets and drawings. The steps are with notched edges and, on the gate vault, a slim dome is profiled on four elegant posts. This furnace bridge was carried out in 1858. Four other small furnace bridges are on both sides nave of the church. They are dedicated to Saint Antoine, Notre-Dame du Mont-Carmel, Notre-Dame du Rosaire, and Saint Joseph. Inside the church are murals and religious statues carved by local artists. The bell-tower is of an ancient date. Its structure is the same one as that of the towers known as "Sarrasines" that one still finds throughout the valley. It is decorated of four bells

== Art ==
In a country of sculptors, Bessans is rich in popular art as in religious art: wheels and stopper rods, hens with salt, wooden toys, statues, and crosses. The best known sculptor was Jean-Baptist Clappier, of the hamlet of Vincendières, one of the first local artists of the Baroque period. Among these sculptures is a representation of the devil, the emblem of Bessans, whose origin goes back only to 1857. This "devil" was created by Etienne Vincendet, known by the and of the 18th century as "of the Saints" because of his talent as an artist.

=== Devil of Bessans ===
In 1857, the cantors of Bessans were refused by the local priest their annual meals. By small revenge, Etienne Vincendet, cantor, carved in wood a statuette of a devil carrying a priest, and left it one evening in front of the door of the presbytery. The priest suspected the Etienne, and brings object back to place it in front of the house of Vincendet. The sculpture continued to be moved back and forth for a whole month, until the sculptor relents. A tourist sees work and bought it.

Etienne Vincendet also carved hundreds of statuettes of Saints and the Holy ones, from which came his nickname of "Etienne of the Saints". His son Pierre François continued the tradition. Today, the "devil" of Bessans is reproduced on the postal flame of the village and throne on the place of the town hall beside the fountain.

The work "ETIENNE OF the SAINTS, INVENTOR OF the" DEVILS OF BESSANS ", memory of Etienne Vincendet, wood-carver and cantor with the Church of Bessans", of Francis Tracq, éd. the Fountain of Siloé 2006, evokes this sculptor and his works.

== Economy ==
The economy of the area is supported by tourism, sheep farming, cooperative dairy and the manufacture of Tomme and Beaufort.

== Events ==
- Artisanal fair: third Sunday of September.
- Employers' festival: June 24; communal: August 15.
- Pilgrimages: with the vault of Third (3 000 m): July 16; at Notre-Dame-de-Rochemelon(the highest vault of Europe, 3 538 m) August:5.
- The Marathon of Bessans in January, competition of mass of ski touring, registered in Euroloppet since 2008
- Biathlon, in March
- The 2008 Biathlon Summer World Championship
- The living creche of Bessans, December 24, with the baby Jesus, the Three Wise Men, performed by more than 50 Bessanais accompanied by the ass, ox, and a goat, performing the oldest texts and songs of Noëls Bessanais (written around 1650). A cave is dug in snow to accommodate Mary, Joseph and the Jesus child.

== Tourism ==
=== Sport ===
Bessans's location has allowed the development of sport at all levels both in winter and summer: skiing, alpine skiing, hiking in the valleys of Avérole and Ribon, mountaineering and climbing, dog sledding.

The town appears particularly conducive to the practice of Nordic activities, with an ideal plan for cross country skiing reinforced by sustained investment of the municipality in this activity. Each year in January, to place on Bessans international marathon. Its preferred features and allow cross-country ski the France team and Biathlon teams from different nations to perform in Bessans training camps each season. The town of Bessans has an international biathlon stadium summer / winter.

Ski touring also benefits from particularly favorable natural conditions. The Avérole Valley is a common place for the practice of this activity. Races for all levels are organized.

The ascent of glaciers (Albaron, Grand Fond, Big Pareis, the Baounet ...), opportunities for loops, the discovery of the highest peak in the Maurienne (the Charbonnel, 3752 m), the Glacier Evettes or Ribon Valley offer multiple opportunities for sporting scenery.

- Rock climbing: rock of Barmette; rock school of Drailles White; Black cliff of Balme.

=== Ski resort ===
2 200 m at the top of the tracks; 3 km (1.9 mi) of alpine ski pistes; 80 km (50 mi) of ski touring.

=== Other activities ===
- Guided tours of the chapels and church
- Fishing, hunting
- Botany and fauna marked trail
- Nature walks
- Camping

== See also ==
- Communes of the Savoie department
