= Billième =

Billième Blyèma (Savoyard)
- Commune
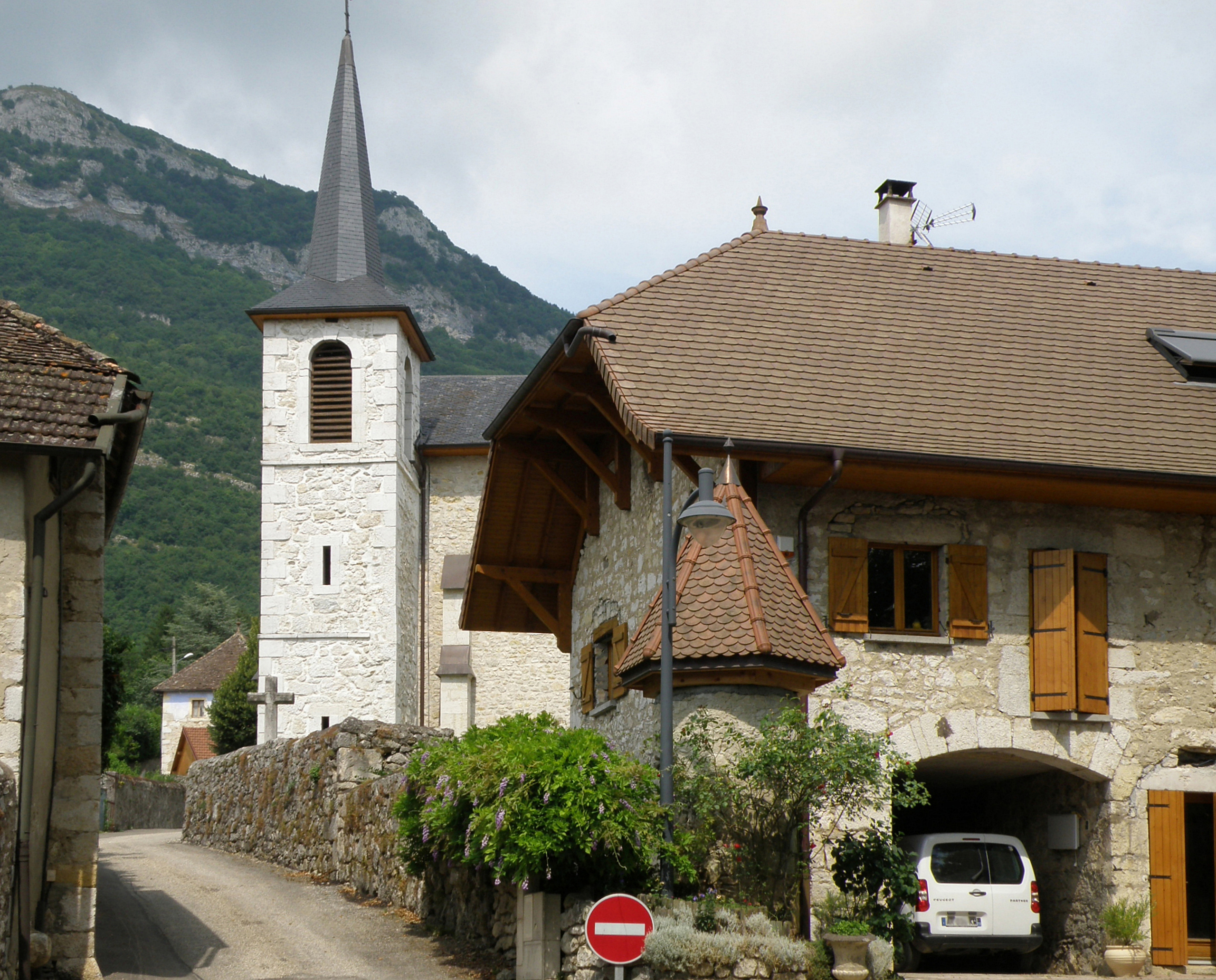
- The church in Billième

- Coat of arms
- Location of Billième
- Location within France Location within Auvergne-Rhône-Alpes
- Coordinates: 45°43′11″N 5°48′36″E
- Country: France
- Region: Auvergne-Rhône-Alpes
- Department: Savoie
- Arrondissement: Chambéry
- Canton: Bugey savoyard
- Intercommunality: Yenne

Government
  - Mayor (2020–2026): Jérôme Piquet
- Area^{1}: 5.98 km^{2} (2.31 sq mi)
- Highest elevation: 1,161 m (3,809 ft)
- Lowest elevation: 320 m (1,050 ft)
- Population (2023): 273
  - Density: 45.7/km^{2} (118/sq mi)
- Time zone: UTC+01:00 (CET)
  - Summer (DST): UTC+02:00 (CEST)
- INSEE/Postal code: 73042 /73170
- ^{1} French Land Register data, which excludes lakes, ponds, glaciers > 1 km^{2} (0.386 sq mi or 247 acres) and river estuaries.

Billième (Arpitan: Blyèma) is a commune in the Savoie department in the Auvergne-Rhône-Alpes region in south-eastern France.

== See also ==
- Communes of the Savoie department
