= Aime =

Commune in Auvergne-Rhône-Alpes, France

Aime Éma (Savoyard)
- Part of Aime-la-Plagne
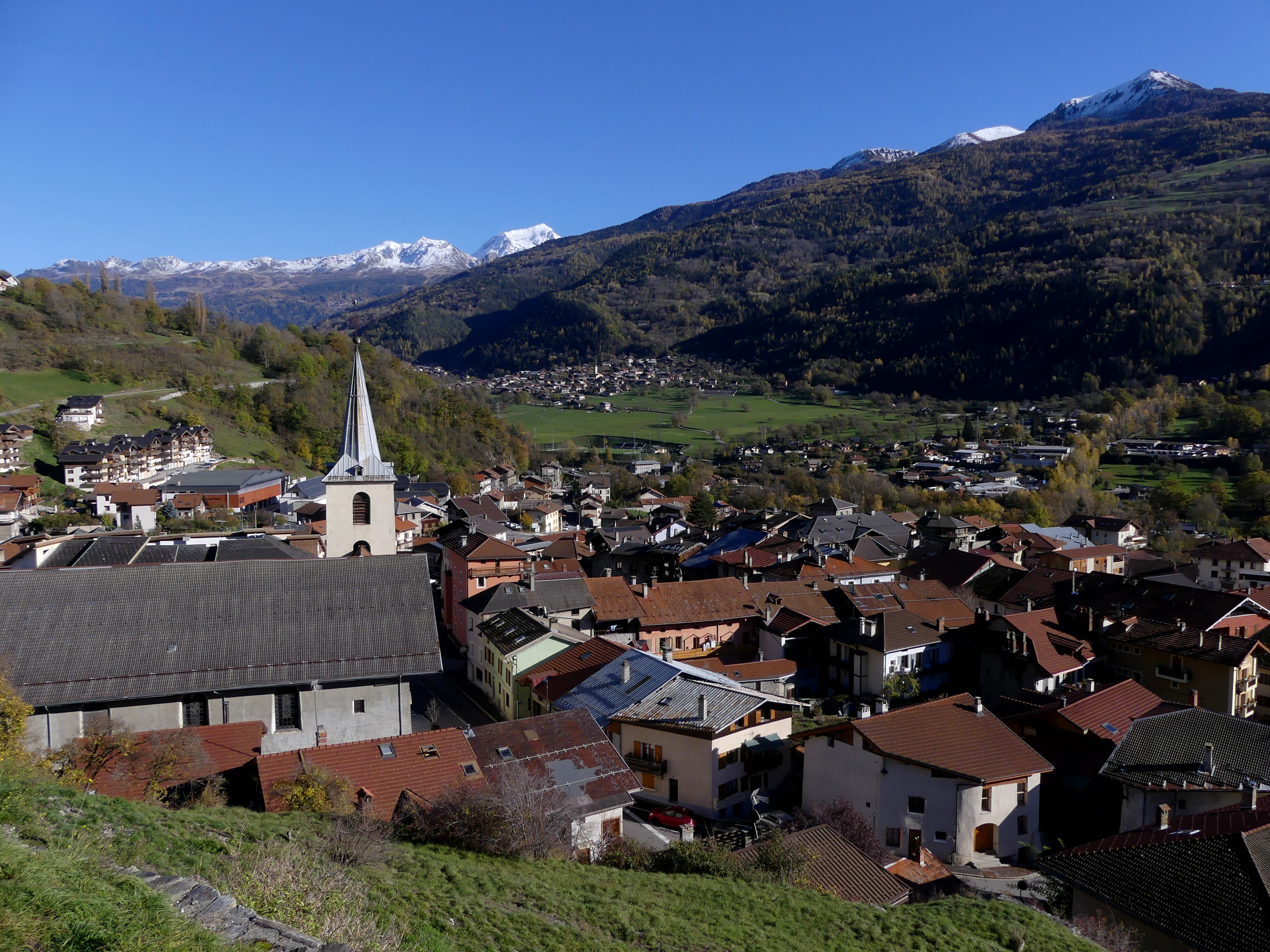
- A general view of Aime

- Coat of arms
- Location of Aime
- Location within France Location within Auvergne-Rhône-Alpes
- Coordinates: 45°33′22″N 6°38′58″E
- Country: France
- Region: Auvergne-Rhône-Alpes
- Department: Savoie
- Arrondissement: Albertville
- Canton: Bourg-Saint-Maurice
- Commune: Aime-la-Plagne
- Area^{1}: 50.74 km^{2} (19.59 sq mi)
- Elevation: 680 m (2,230 ft)
- Highest elevation: 2,589 m (8,494 ft)
- Lowest elevation: 596 m (1,955 ft)
- Population (2021): 3,596
  - Density: 70.87/km^{2} (183.6/sq mi)
- Time zone: UTC+01:00 (CET)
  - Summer (DST): UTC+02:00 (CEST)
- Postal code: 73210
- ^{1} French Land Register data, which excludes lakes, ponds, glaciers > 1 km^{2} (0.386 sq mi or 247 acres) and river estuaries.

Aime (French pronunciation: [ɛm]; Savoyard: Éma) is a former commune in the eastern French department of Savoie. Its most well known mayor was Pierre Borrione, who created the local ski resort and historical society.

On 1 January 2016, it was merged into the new commune of Aime-la-Plagne. In 1972 and 1973, the former communes of Longefoy, Tessens and Villette were merged with Aime.

== History ==
In ancient time, Aime was the capital city center of the gallic tribe called the Ceutrons. Conquered by Rome, probably around 20 BC, it became Axima, the capital city of the roman province of the Graian Alps (Latin:: Alpes Graiæ ; French: Alpes grées) which became later the Alpes Atrectianae et Poeninae.

Its main landmark is the Basilica of Saint Martin.

== Geography ==
The commune lies in the Tarentaise Valley, partly overlapping the ski resorts of La Plagne and Les Arcs.

== Population ==
Historical population
Year	Pop.	±% p.a.
1975	2,454	—
1982	2,615	+0.91%
1990	2,963	+1.57%
1999	3,229	+0.96%
2006	3,369	+0.61%
2011	3,541	+1.00%
2021	3,596	+0.15%
Source: EHESS and INSEE

== Transportation ==
The town is served by the Aime-La Plagne railway station, with rail connections to Bourg-Saint-Maurice, Albertville, Chambéry, Lyon and further.

== See also ==
- Communes of the Savoie department
- SHAA (Historical Society of Aime) - Official web site
