= Valezan =

Valezan Valzan (Savoyard)
- Part of La Plagne Tarentaise
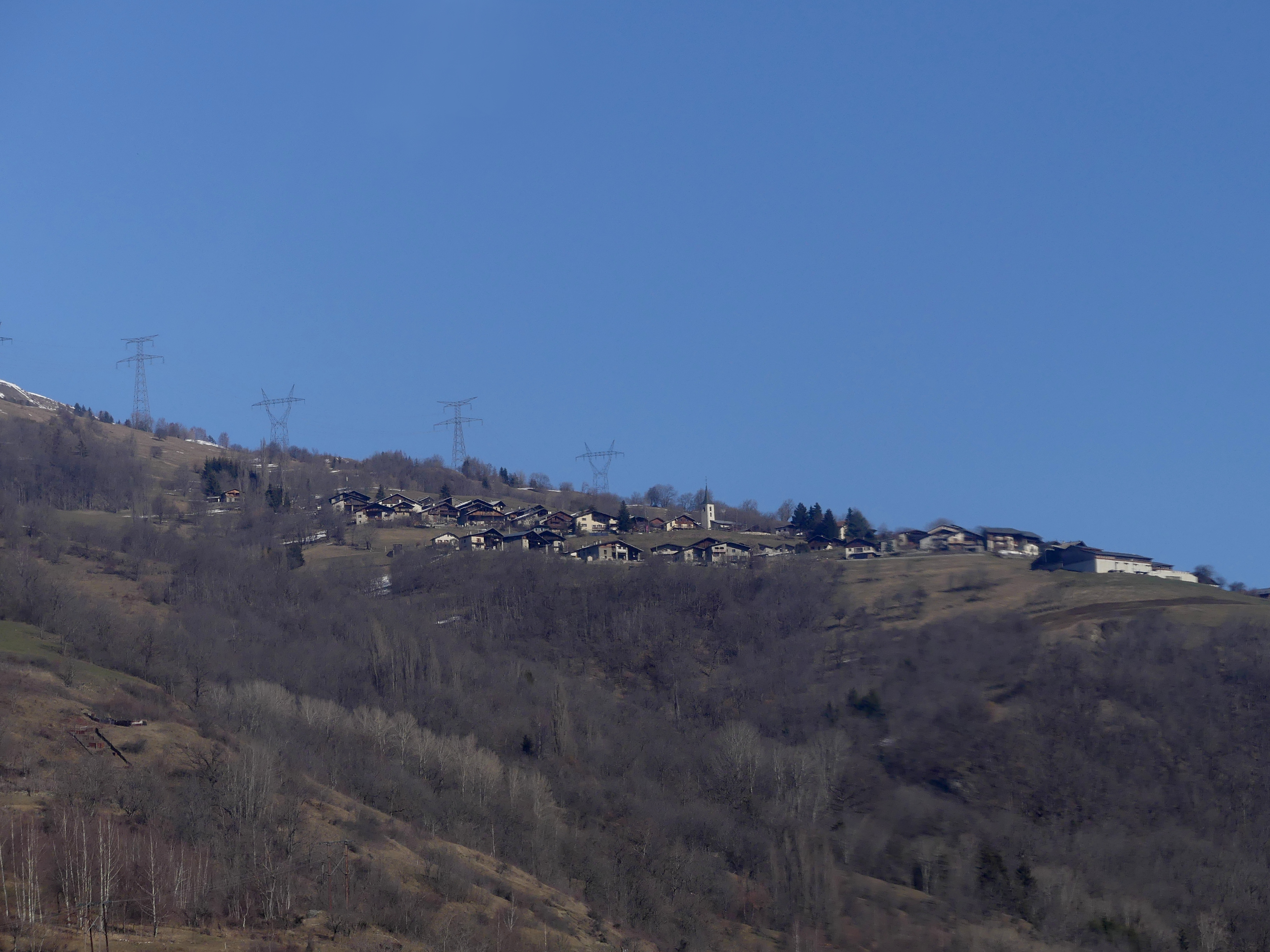
- The mountains and the ski station
- Location of Valezan
- Location within France Location within Auvergne-Rhône-Alpes
- Coordinates: 45°34′33″N 6°41′40″E
- Country: France
- Region: Auvergne-Rhône-Alpes
- Department: Savoie
- Arrondissement: Albertville
- Canton: Bourg-Saint-Maurice
- Commune: La Plagne Tarentaise
- Area^{1}: 8.01 km^{2} (3.09 sq mi)
- Highest elevation: 2,409 m (7,904 ft)
- Lowest elevation: 695 m (2,280 ft)
- Population (2022): 205
  - Density: 25.6/km^{2} (66.3/sq mi)
- Time zone: UTC+01:00 (CET)
  - Summer (DST): UTC+02:00 (CEST)
- Postal code: 73210
- ^{1} French Land Register data, which excludes lakes, ponds, glaciers > 1 km^{2} (0.386 sq mi or 247 acres) and river estuaries.

Valezan (French pronunciation: [valzɑ̃]; Savoyard: Valzan) is a former commune in the Savoie department in the Auvergne-Rhône-Alpes region in south-eastern France. On 1 January 2016, it was merged into the new commune of La Plagne Tarentaise.

== See also ==
- Communes of the Savoie department
