= Peisey-Nancroix =

- Commune
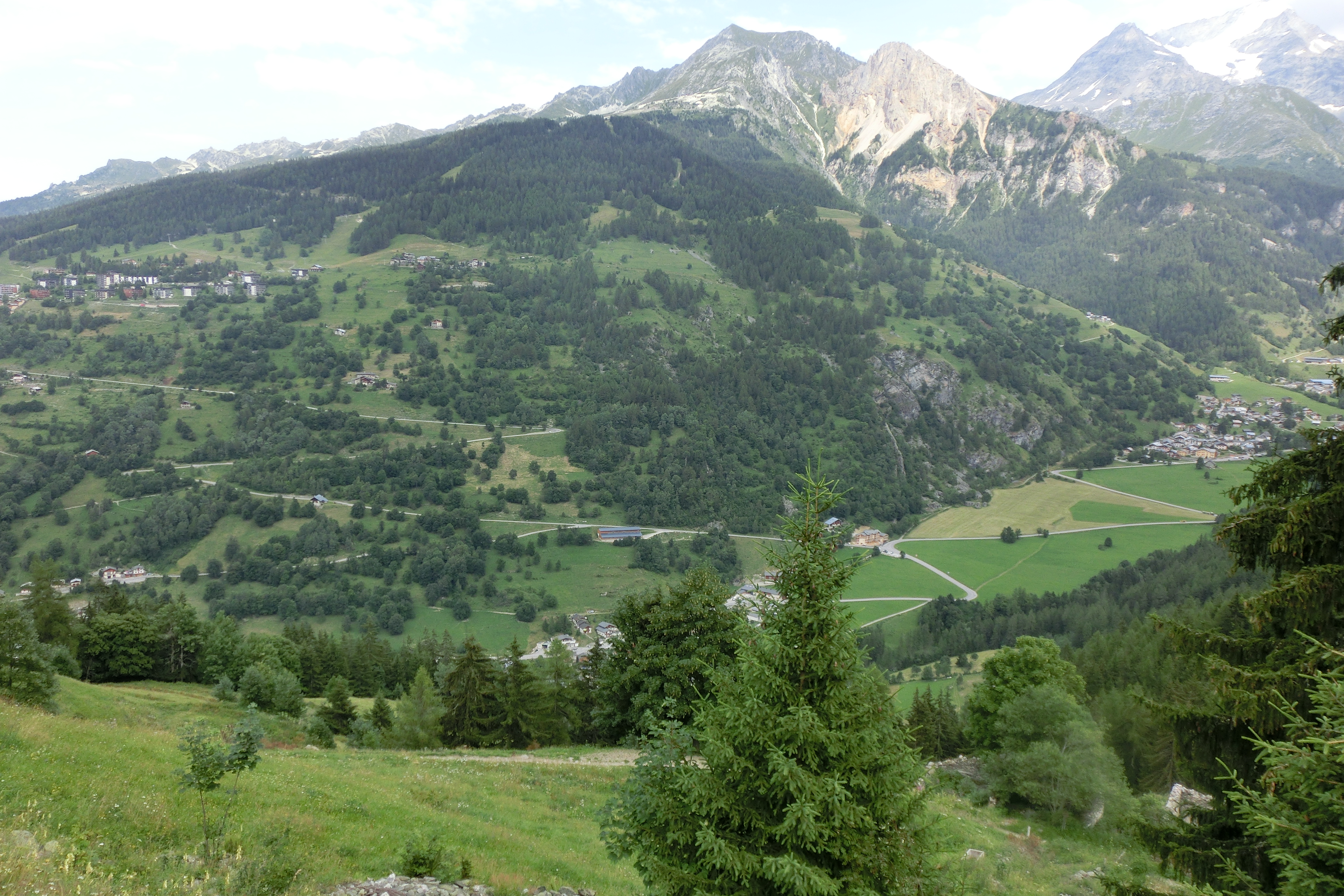
- A general view of Peisey-Nancroix

- Coat of arms
- Location of Peisey-Nancroix
- Location within France Location within Auvergne-Rhône-Alpes
- Coordinates: 45°32′50″N 6°45′25″E
- Country: France
- Region: Auvergne-Rhône-Alpes
- Department: Savoie
- Arrondissement: Albertville
- Canton: Bourg-Saint-Maurice

Government
  - Mayor (2020–2026): Guillaume Villibord
- Area^{1}: 70.64 km^{2} (27.27 sq mi)
- Highest elevation: 3,779 m (12,398 ft)
- Lowest elevation: 1,100 m (3,600 ft)
- Population (2023): 632
  - Density: 8.95/km^{2} (23.2/sq mi)
- Time zone: UTC+01:00 (CET)
  - Summer (DST): UTC+02:00 (CEST)
- INSEE/Postal code: 73197 /73210
- ^{1} French Land Register data, which excludes lakes, ponds, glaciers > 1 km^{2} (0.386 sq mi or 247 acres) and river estuaries.

Peisey-Nancroix (French pronunciation: [pɛzɛ nɑ̃kʁwa]; Arpitan: Péjèy) is a commune in the Savoie department in the Auvergne-Rhône-Alpes region in southeastern France.

== Geography ==
=== Climate ===
Peisey-Nancroix has a humid continental climate (Köppen climate classification Dfb) closely bordering on an oceanic climate (Cfb). The average annual temperature in Peisey-Nancroix is 8.2 °C (46.8 °F). The average annual rainfall is 946.9 mm (37.28 in) with December as the wettest month. The temperatures are highest on average in July, at around 17.2 °C (63.0 °F), and lowest in January, at around −0.2 °C (31.6 °F). The highest temperature ever recorded in Peisey-Nancroix was 35.3 °C (95.5 °F) on 27 June 2019; the coldest temperature ever recorded was −23.0 °C (−9.4 °F) on 11 February 1956.

Climate data for Peisey-Nancroix (1991−2020 normals, extremes 1950−present)
Month	Jan	Feb	Mar	Apr	May	Jun	Jul	Aug	Sep	Oct	Nov	Dec	Year
Record high °C (°F)	15.5 (59.9)	17.5 (63.5)	21.1 (70.0)	25.0 (77.0)	28.8 (83.8)	35.3 (95.5)	33.6 (92.5)	33.9 (93.0)	30.5 (86.9)	25.4 (77.7)	21.0 (69.8)	14.0 (57.2)	35.3 (95.5)
Mean daily maximum °C (°F)	3.3 (37.9)	4.5 (40.1)	8.9 (48.0)	12.4 (54.3)	16.7 (62.1)	20.8 (69.4)	23.0 (73.4)	22.7 (72.9)	18.2 (64.8)	13.5 (56.3)	7.5 (45.5)	3.2 (37.8)	12.9 (55.2)
Daily mean °C (°F)	−0.2 (31.6)	0.4 (32.7)	4.1 (39.4)	7.3 (45.1)	11.4 (52.5)	15.2 (59.4)	17.2 (63.0)	17.1 (62.8)	13.1 (55.6)	9.2 (48.6)	3.9 (39.0)	0.2 (32.4)	8.2 (46.8)
Mean daily minimum °C (°F)	−3.8 (25.2)	−3.8 (25.2)	−0.8 (30.6)	2.3 (36.1)	6.1 (43.0)	9.7 (49.5)	11.3 (52.3)	11.4 (52.5)	8.0 (46.4)	4.9 (40.8)	0.2 (32.4)	−2.9 (26.8)	3.6 (38.5)
Record low °C (°F)	−22.0 (−7.6)	−23.0 (−9.4)	−20.5 (−4.9)	−10.5 (13.1)	−5.5 (22.1)	−1.3 (29.7)	0.0 (32.0)	1.5 (34.7)	−2.0 (28.4)	−7.5 (18.5)	−13.0 (8.6)	−17.0 (1.4)	−23.0 (−9.4)
Average precipitation mm (inches)	86.8 (3.42)	63.8 (2.51)	65.6 (2.58)	61.6 (2.43)	89.3 (3.52)	88.6 (3.49)	88.9 (3.50)	78.2 (3.08)	69.9 (2.75)	76.2 (3.00)	79.8 (3.14)	98.2 (3.87)	946.9 (37.28)
Average precipitation days (≥ 1.0 mm)	9.0	8.3	8.4	8.5	11.7	10.6	10.1	9.3	8.7	9.0	9.2	10.2	112.9
Source: Météo-France

== See also ==
- Communes of the Savoie department
