= Canton of Bourg-Saint-Maurice =

Coordinates: 45.62°N 6.77°E

The canton of Bourg-Saint-Maurice is an administrative division of the Savoie department, southeastern France. Its borders were modified at the French canton reorganisation which came into effect in March 2015. Its seat is in Bourg-Saint-Maurice.

It consists of the following communes:

1. Aime-la-Plagne
2. Bourg-Saint-Maurice
3. Les Chapelles
4. Landry
5. Montvalezan
6. Peisey-Nancroix
7. La Plagne-Tarentaise
8. Sainte-Foy-Tarentaise
9. Séez
10. Tignes
11. Val-d'Isère
12. Villaroger
