= Mouxy =

Mouxy Meûssi (Savoyard)
- Commune
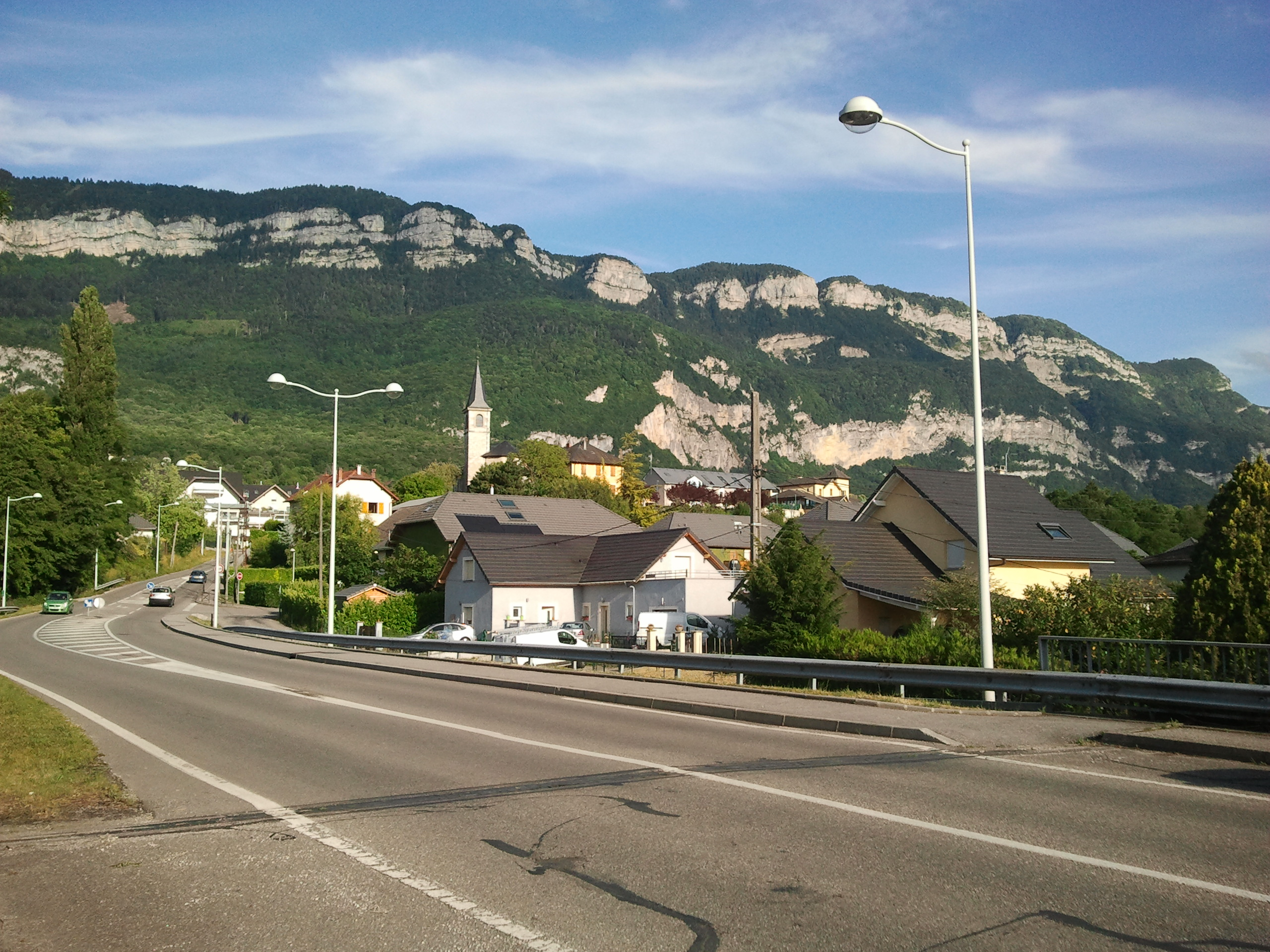
- The D913 road in Mouxy

- Coat of arms
- Location of Mouxy
- Location within France Location within Auvergne-Rhône-Alpes
- Coordinates: 45°40′58″N 5°56′07″E
- Country: France
- Region: Auvergne-Rhône-Alpes
- Department: Savoie
- Arrondissement: Chambéry
- Canton: Aix-les-Bains-2
- Intercommunality: CA Grand Lac

Government
  - Mayor (2024–2026): Armelle Person
- Area^{1}: 6.28 km^{2} (2.42 sq mi)
- Highest elevation: 1,530 m (5,020 ft)
- Lowest elevation: 349 m (1,145 ft)
- Population (2023): 2,311
  - Density: 368/km^{2} (953/sq mi)
- Time zone: UTC+01:00 (CET)
  - Summer (DST): UTC+02:00 (CEST)
- INSEE/Postal code: 73182 /73100
- Website: www.mairie-mouxy.fr
- ^{1} French Land Register data, which excludes lakes, ponds, glaciers > 1 km^{2} (0.386 sq mi or 247 acres) and river estuaries.

Mouxy (French pronunciation: [muksi]; Savoyard: Meûssi) is a commune in the Savoie department in the Auvergne-Rhône-Alpes region in south-eastern France.

== Geography ==
Dominated by Mount Revard, the Town of Mouxy is located on the heights above Aix-les-Bains, to which it is adjacent. It is part of the urban area of Chambéry, and of the agglomeration community of Grand Lac.

The important nearby towns of Annecy to the north, and Chambéry to the south, are located at distances as the crow flies of 28.9 km [18.0 mi] and 12.5 km [7¾ miles], respectively.

The town is 6.28 km^{2} (2.42 sq mi) in area; the elevations range from 349 to 1,530 meters [1,145 to 5,020 ft]. The lowest point lies at the edge of Aix-les-Bains to the south of the town, the high point is the top of Mount Revard. Downtown is located at an elevation of about 405 m [1,329 ft]. the municipality overlooks Lake Bourget, the largest natural lake in France, and offers a view of the surrounding peaks including the croix du Nivolet, the Chartreuse Massif, Mount Granier and the Cat's Tooth. It extends from the Aix-les-Bains plain to the Massif of Bauges. The population density decreases as you approach Mount Revard. Indeed, some places are absolutely vertical, without access, and unbuildable.

== Neighboring towns ==
Mouxy is bordered by four municipalities: Pugny-Chatenod on the north, Drumettaz-Clarafond on the south, Aix-les-Bains on the east, and Les Déserts on the west.

Many localities make up the collective community such as Chenoz, Montecovie, La Croix Balmont, Le Crêt, Le Faubourg, Le Biollay, and Le Mentens.

== Geology ==
The particular geology of the area surrounding Aix-Les-Bains, including Mouxy, was the subject of a study published in December 2009. This study focuses on the geological evolution of the scene surrounding Aix-Les-Bains to explain the peculiarity of the local thermal system and is entitled: the Influence of paleoclimatic events on the functioning of an alpine thermal system (France): contribution of modeling thermal-hydrodynamique.

Terrain of the municipality consists of glacial alluvium with the Urgonian Limestone Formation in the locality. Climbing up the slopes of the Bauges Massif, there are several types of rocks and limestone-marl but above all, the Urgonian Limestone Formation is largely found near the Revard and in almost all of the massif.

== History ==
The evolution of the commune is marked by the history of Aix-les-Bains, and in particular the importance of Lake Bourget and the hot springs of the city of Aix that always made Aix-les-Bains a showplace of therapeutic mineral bathing. One can also say, more generally, that the history of Mouxy is closely linked to that of the Department of Savoie.

=== Neolithic and antiquity ===
The site was inhabited since the Neolithic Era. Indeed, some sedentary farming communities settled in the Plains and the great valleys of average altitude. The first real phase of occupation by people was observed from deposits at organic geological levels preserved at Saint-Pierre-de-Curtille (Lake Bourget).

The area was then occupied by the people of the Allobroges. The [area of the Allobroges was occupied by the Roman legions following their victory in 121 B.C.E.

By 443, the Roman General Aëtius had ceded Sapaudia the Latin name of present-day Savoy to a Germanic people, the Burgundians.

=== Middle Ages ===
Mouxy was a parish - Mauseu ecclesia - which depended on the Priory of Clarafont according to an act of 1344. During this period, a new church dedicated to Saint-John-the-Greater was built. Previously, the Mouxy area depended on either the Priory of Saint-Pol or Saint-Hippolyte in Aix. The parish was subsequently attached to the Priory of Aix in the 16th century. We learn that the priest of the Church, in 1340, offered to the Bishop during his pastoral visit a stipend of 9 florins. In 1494, the income of the parish priest was estimated to be 50 guilders. The Church did not originally have an image of its patron saint, or other object of worship. By 1678 it had relics of Saint James, Saint Alexis and the true cross.

The village of Mouxy had about 30 households in 1494 and 1497. In the following century, proceeds to 42 households and 440 communicants. They were 420 communicants in 1667. The number subsequently continued to reach approximately 300 inhabitants of whom there were 220 communicants in 1729.

=== Contemporary ===
In 1860, the period of the unification of Italy led to the question of the future of the Duchy of Savoy. The latter was part of a transaction between the King of Piedmont-Sardinia, Victor Emmanuel I of Sardinia, and the Emperor of the French, Napoleon III. Following the Treaty of Turin which saw the annexation of Savoy by France, Mouxy became as throughout the territory of the Duchy henceforth now French.

=== World War II ===
On June 10, 1940, Mussolini declared war on France; Savoie was caught in a vise. The fighting with Italy began in the Alps. The Italian army of 22 divisions and 321,000 men commanded by Crown Prince Umberto of Savoy and General Alfredo Guzzoni occupied the Petit-Saint-Bernard and the Mont-Cenis sectors. Against this force, 185,000 men of French General René Olry managed to resist. In the Valley, the Germans crossed the Rhône in Culoz and entered Aix and its surrounding towns and villages, Chambéry had not yet fallen. The signing of the 22 June 1940 armistice ended fighting.

A second armistice, with Italy, was signed on 24 June, which provided for Italy's occupation of Haute-Tarentaise and the demilitarization of the border. This situation was to become explosive for the entire department.

=== Important dates ===
January 1, 1943: the Italians occupied all of Savoy. They controlled the Franco-Swiss border.

April 16, 1943: complete closure of the Franco-Swiss border from April 16 to May 3, 1943; September 1943: a roundup of Jews by the Gestapo occurred in Chambéry; German troops invaded Savoy.

=== The end of the war ===
August 21, 1944, Aix and its surroundings were liberated. The occupiers surrendered to the encircling forces beginning at 23:30. A departmental Committee of Liberation and Resistance movements, was established, and Lucien Rose became prefect. In the aftermath of the Second World War, the territory was disrupted.

Many territorial changes occurred in the 1950s and mainly during the [30 years of postwar prosperity known in France as the] Trente Glorieuses [(Glorious Thirty, the 30-years immediately following World War II)]. These changes resulted in the construction of new housing, and as a result, development of urban life in still-rural areas.

Later, in the context of sustainable development, in 1995 the Rhône-Alpes region developed regional natural parks enhanced by the Massif des Bauges (regional natural park of the Bauges).

=== Mont Revard and its influence in the 20th century ===
Mouxy connects the Valley of Aix-les-Bains to the mountain. The Revard ski station in 1908, was the first ski resort in France, which participated actively in the construction of infrastructure of transport through Mouxy (rack and cable car) to carry skiers to the Summit, and this until [the system was improved] in 1969. Mouxy thus had two stations.

== Population ==
Historical population
Year	Pop.	±% p.a.
1968	746	—
1975	822	+1.40%
1982	910	+1.46%
1990	1,308	+4.64%
1999	1,523	+1.71%
2007	1,888	+2.72%
2012	2,207	+3.17%
2017	2,234	+0.24%
2023	2,311	+0.57%
Source: INSEE

Like its peripheral communes, Mouxy has had (and is still having) a strong increase in population since the 1930s, particularly in the 1980s. At the departmental level, the rural exodus has been pronounced.

The main points at the departmental level are the increase in the size of the cities, a location in the heart of important communication routes and the creations of universities such as Technolac (important high-tech research and development facility about ten kilometers from Mouxy).

== See also ==
- Communes of the Savoie department
