= Trévignin =

Trévignin Trèvnyin (Savoyard)
- Commune
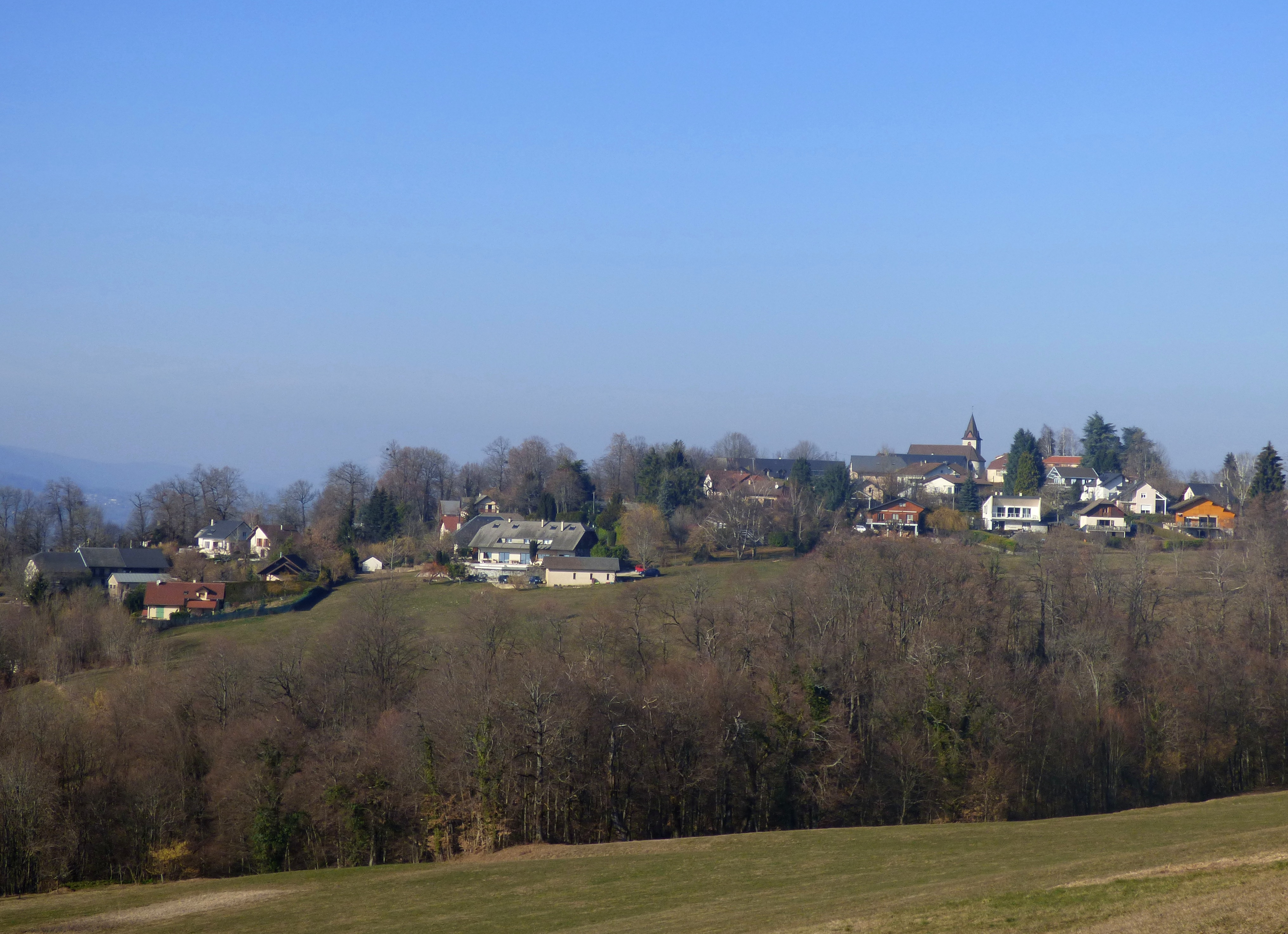
- View of Trévignin from Pugny-Chatenod
- Location of Trévignin
- Location within France Location within Auvergne-Rhône-Alpes
- Coordinates: 45°42′30″N 5°57′25″E
- Country: France
- Region: Auvergne-Rhône-Alpes
- Department: Savoie
- Arrondissement: Chambéry
- Canton: Aix-les-Bains-1
- Intercommunality: CA Grand Lac

Government
  - Mayor (2023–2026): Nicolas Chapuis
- Area^{1}: 6.89 km^{2} (2.66 sq mi)
- Highest elevation: 1,563 m (5,128 ft)
- Lowest elevation: 433 m (1,421 ft)
- Population (2023): 870
  - Density: 130/km^{2} (330/sq mi)
- Time zone: UTC+01:00 (CET)
  - Summer (DST): UTC+02:00 (CEST)
- INSEE/Postal code: 73301 /73100
- Website: www.trevignin.fr
- ^{1} French Land Register data, which excludes lakes, ponds, glaciers > 1 km^{2} (0.386 sq mi or 247 acres) and river estuaries.

Trévignin (French pronunciation: [tʁeviɲɛ̃]; Savoyard: Trèvnyin) is a commune in the Savoie department in the Auvergne-Rhône-Alpes region in south-eastern France. It is part of the urban area of Chambéry.

== Geography ==
=== Climate ===
Trévignin has an oceanic climate (Köppen climate classification Cfb). The average annual temperature in Trévignin is 9.8 °C (49.6 °F). The average annual rainfall is 1,517.3 mm (59.74 in) with October as the wettest month. The temperatures are highest on average in July, at around 19.0 °C (66.2 °F), and lowest in January, at around 1.0 °C (33.8 °F). The highest temperature ever recorded in Trévignin was 36.2 °C (97.2 °F) on 13 August 2003; the coldest temperature ever recorded was −17.8 °C (0.0 °F) on 5 February 2012.

Climate data for Trévignin (1991−2020 normals, extremes 1989−2020)
| Month | Jan | Feb | Mar | Apr | May | Jun | Jul | Aug | Sep | Oct | Nov | Dec | Year |
|---|---|---|---|---|---|---|---|---|---|---|---|---|---|
| Record high °C (°F) | 15.2 (59.4) | 18.1 (64.6) | 23.2 (73.8) | 25.4 (77.7) | 29.8 (85.6) | 33.6 (92.5) | 34.5 (94.1) | 36.2 (97.2) | 28.2 (82.8) | 24.0 (75.2) | 19.8 (67.6) | 21.5 (70.7) | 36.2 (97.2) |
| Mean daily maximum °C (°F) | 3.8 (38.8) | 5.4 (41.7) | 10.0 (50.0) | 13.7 (56.7) | 17.8 (64.0) | 21.9 (71.4) | 24.2 (75.6) | 23.7 (74.7) | 18.8 (65.8) | 13.9 (57.0) | 8.1 (46.6) | 4.6 (40.3) | 13.8 (56.8) |
| Daily mean °C (°F) | 1.0 (33.8) | 2.0 (35.6) | 5.7 (42.3) | 9.0 (48.2) | 13.0 (55.4) | 16.9 (62.4) | 19.0 (66.2) | 18.7 (65.7) | 14.5 (58.1) | 10.3 (50.5) | 5.1 (41.2) | 1.8 (35.2) | 9.8 (49.6) |
| Mean daily minimum °C (°F) | −1.7 (28.9) | −1.5 (29.3) | 1.5 (34.7) | 4.3 (39.7) | 8.2 (46.8) | 11.9 (53.4) | 13.9 (57.0) | 13.7 (56.7) | 10.2 (50.4) | 6.8 (44.2) | 2.1 (35.8) | −0.9 (30.4) | 5.7 (42.3) |
| Record low °C (°F) | −12.9 (8.8) | −17.8 (0.0) | −15.0 (5.0) | −7.0 (19.4) | −1.1 (30.0) | 2.5 (36.5) | 5.5 (41.9) | 4.9 (40.8) | 0.9 (33.6) | −4.8 (23.4) | −9.2 (15.4) | −15.3 (4.5) | −17.8 (0.0) |
| Average precipitation mm (inches) | 114.7 (4.52) | 99.7 (3.93) | 113.5 (4.47) | 123.3 (4.85) | 138.5 (5.45) | 125.7 (4.95) | 126.7 (4.99) | 127.7 (5.03) | 133.4 (5.25) | 138.9 (5.47) | 137.1 (5.40) | 138.1 (5.44) | 1,517.3 (59.74) |
| Average precipitation days (≥ 1.0 mm) | 11.1 | 10.0 | 10.9 | 10.9 | 12.5 | 11.1 | 9.7 | 9.4 | 9.4 | 11.1 | 11.8 | 12.2 | 129.9 |
Source: Météo-France

== See also ==
- Communes of the Savoie department
