= Saint-Offenge-Dessous =

Saint-Offenge-Dessous Sant-Ofinzho-dzo (Savoyard)
- Part of Saint-Offenge
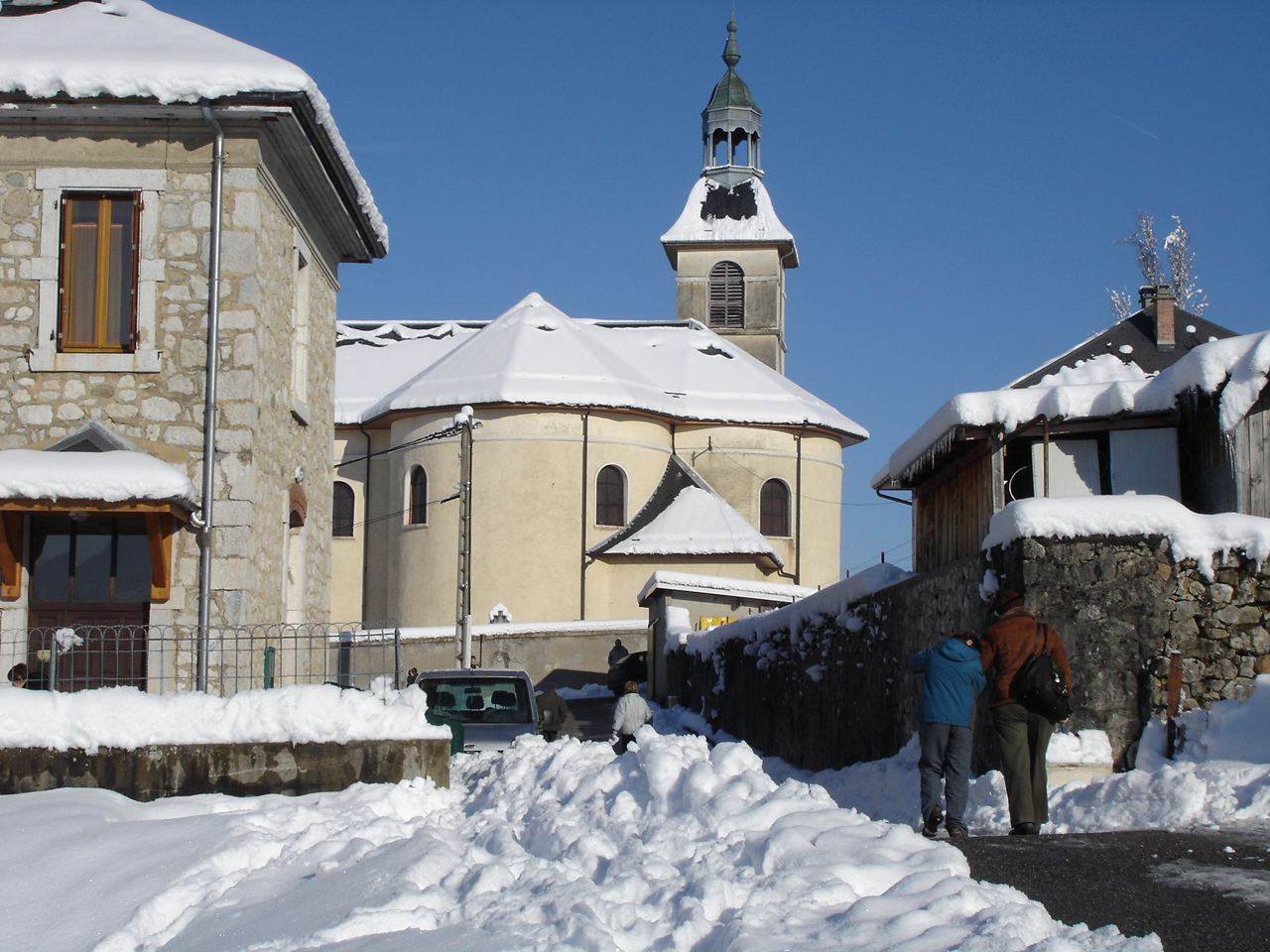
- Location of Saint-Offenge-Dessous
- Location within France Location within Auvergne-Rhône-Alpes
- Coordinates: 45°44′10″N 6°00′10″E
- Country: France
- Region: Auvergne-Rhône-Alpes
- Department: Savoie
- Arrondissement: Chambéry
- Canton: Aix-les-Bains-1
- Commune: Saint-Offenge
- Area^{1}: 7.92 km^{2} (3.06 sq mi)
- Highest elevation: 1,410 m (4,630 ft)
- Lowest elevation: 404 m (1,325 ft)
- Population (2019): 803
  - Density: 101/km^{2} (263/sq mi)
- Time zone: UTC+01:00 (CET)
  - Summer (DST): UTC+02:00 (CEST)
- Postal code: 73100
- Website: Official site
- ^{1} French Land Register data, which excludes lakes, ponds, glaciers > 1 km^{2} (0.386 sq mi or 247 acres) and river estuaries.

Saint-Offenge-Dessous (French pronunciation: [sɛ̃t‿ɔfɑ̃ʒ dəsu], "Lower Saint-Offenge"; Savoyard: Sant-Ofinzho-dzo) is a former commune in the Savoie department in the Rhône-Alpes region in south-eastern France. On 1 January 2015, Saint-Offenge-Dessous and Saint-Offenge-Dessus merged becoming one commune called Saint-Offenge.

== See also ==
- Communes of the Savoie department
