= Saint-Offenge-Dessus =

Saint-Offenge-Dessus Sant-Ofinzho-dsu (Savoyard)
- Part of Saint-Offenge
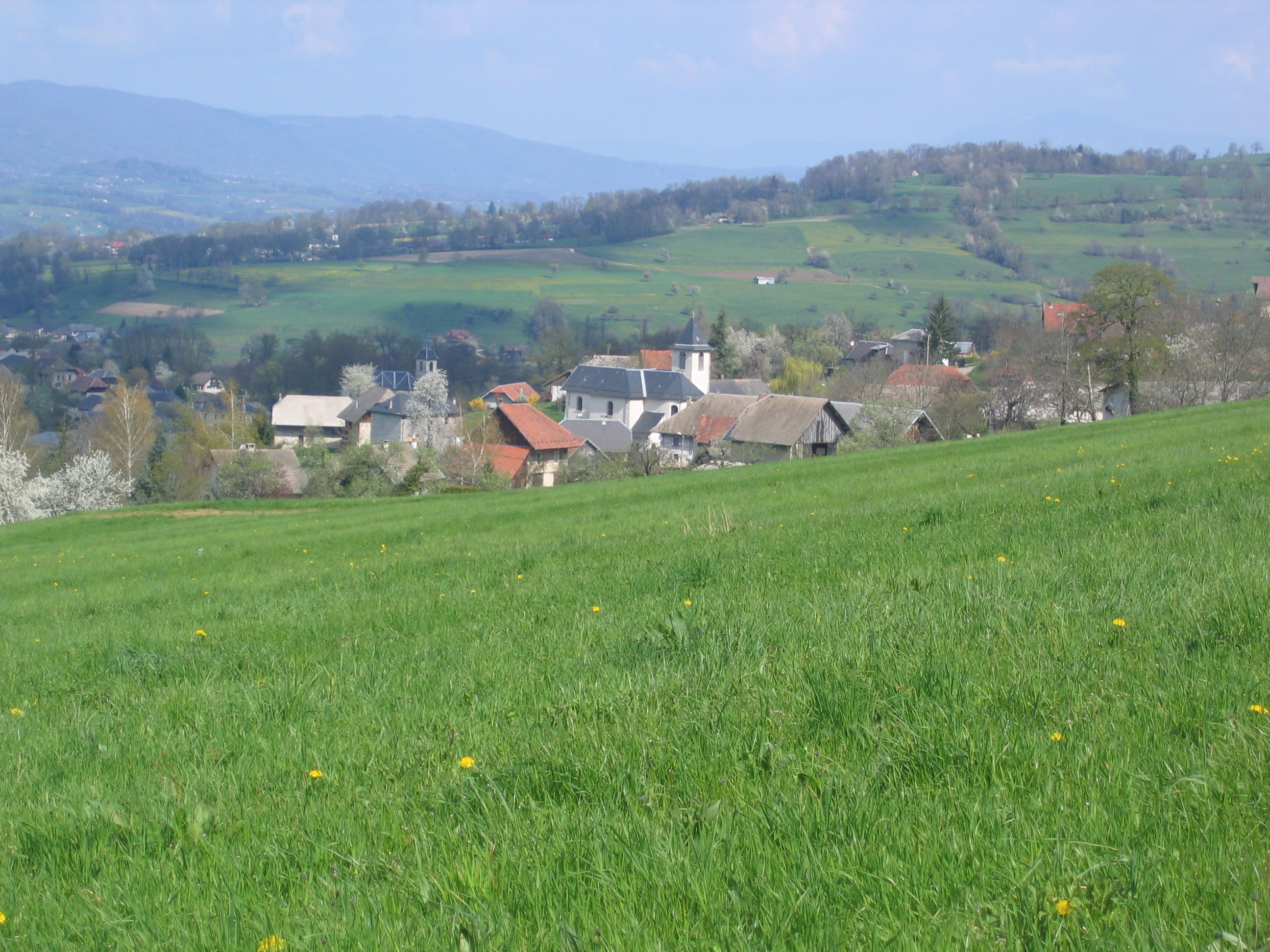
- A general view of Saint-Offenge-Dessus
- Location of Saint-Offenge-Dessus
- Location within France Location within Auvergne-Rhône-Alpes
- Coordinates: 45°43′39″N 6°00′23″E
- Country: France
- Region: Auvergne-Rhône-Alpes
- Department: Savoie
- Arrondissement: Chambéry
- Canton: Aix-les-Bains-1
- Commune: Saint-Offenge
- Area^{1}: 7.71 km^{2} (2.98 sq mi)
- Highest elevation: 1,449 m (4,754 ft)
- Lowest elevation: 556 m (1,824 ft)
- Population (2019): 342
  - Density: 44.4/km^{2} (115/sq mi)
- Time zone: UTC+01:00 (CET)
  - Summer (DST): UTC+02:00 (CEST)
- Postal code: 73100
- ^{1} French Land Register data, which excludes lakes, ponds, glaciers > 1 km^{2} (0.386 sq mi or 247 acres) and river estuaries.

Saint-Offenge-Dessus (French pronunciation: [sɛ̃t‿ɔfɑ̃ʒ dəsy], "Upper Saint-Offenge"; Savoyard: Sant-Ofinzho-dsu) is a former commune in the Savoie department in the Rhône-Alpes region in south-eastern France. On 1 January 2015, Saint-Offenge-Dessus and Saint-Offenge-Dessous merged becoming one commune called Saint-Offenge.

== See also ==
- Communes of the Savoie department
