= Ruffieux =

Ruffieux Rfyo (Savoyard)
- Commune
- Coat of arms
- Location of Ruffieux
- Location within France Location within Auvergne-Rhône-Alpes
- Coordinates: 45°51′00″N 5°50′39″E
- Country: France
- Region: Auvergne-Rhône-Alpes
- Department: Savoie
- Arrondissement: Chambéry
- Canton: Bugey savoyard
- Intercommunality: CA Grand Lac

Government
  - Mayor (2020–2026): Olivier Rognard
- Area^{1}: 13.21 km^{2} (5.10 sq mi)
- Highest elevation: 1,021 m (3,350 ft)
- Lowest elevation: 233 m (764 ft)
- Population (2023): 819
  - Density: 62.0/km^{2} (161/sq mi)
- Time zone: UTC+01:00 (CET)
  - Summer (DST): UTC+02:00 (CEST)
- INSEE/Postal code: 73218 /73310
- ^{1} French Land Register data, which excludes lakes, ponds, glaciers > 1 km^{2} (0.386 sq mi or 247 acres) and river estuaries.

Ruffieux (French pronunciation: [ʁyfjø]; Savoyard: Rfyo) is a commune in the Savoie department in the Auvergne-Rhône-Alpes region in south-eastern France.

== See also ==
- Communes of the Savoie department
