= Tresserve =

Tresserve Trèssarve (Savoyard)
- Commune
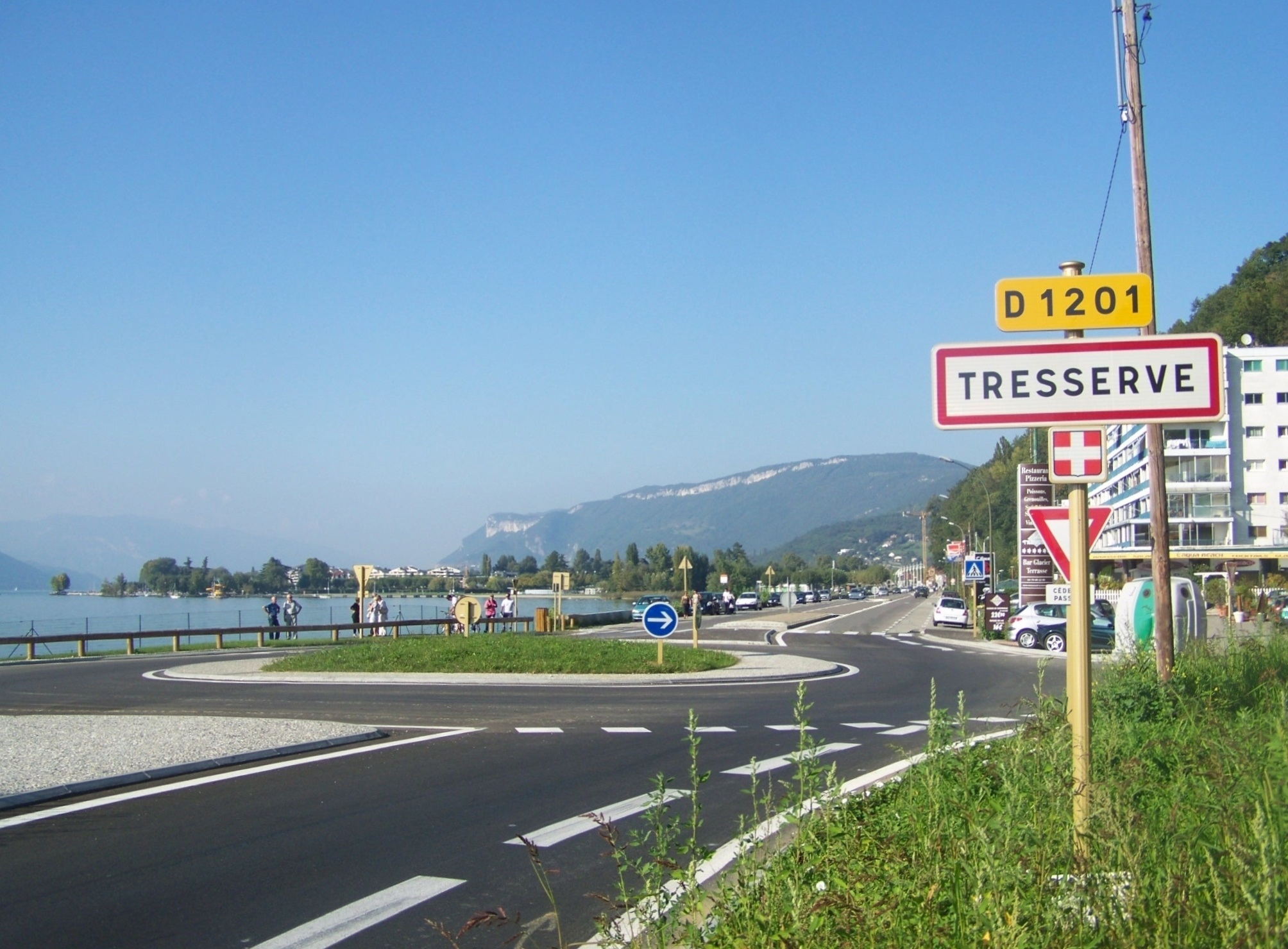
- The road into Tresserve, alongside the Bourget lake

- Coat of arms
- Location of Tresserve
- Location within France Location within Auvergne-Rhône-Alpes
- Coordinates: 45°40′27″N 5°54′00″E
- Country: France
- Region: Auvergne-Rhône-Alpes
- Department: Savoie
- Arrondissement: Chambéry
- Canton: Aix-les-Bains-2
- Intercommunality: CA Grand Lac

Government
  - Mayor (2020–2026): Jean-Claude Loiseau
- Area^{1}: 2.77 km^{2} (1.07 sq mi)
- Highest elevation: 331 m (1,086 ft)
- Lowest elevation: 228 m (748 ft)
- Population (2023): 2,909
  - Density: 1,050/km^{2} (2,720/sq mi)
- Time zone: UTC+01:00 (CET)
  - Summer (DST): UTC+02:00 (CEST)
- INSEE/Postal code: 73300 /73100
- ^{1} French Land Register data, which excludes lakes, ponds, glaciers > 1 km^{2} (0.386 sq mi or 247 acres) and river estuaries.

Tresserve (French pronunciation: [tʁesɛʁv]; Savoyard: Trèssarve) is a commune in the Savoie department in the Auvergne-Rhône-Alpes region in south-eastern France. It is part of the urban area of Chambéry.

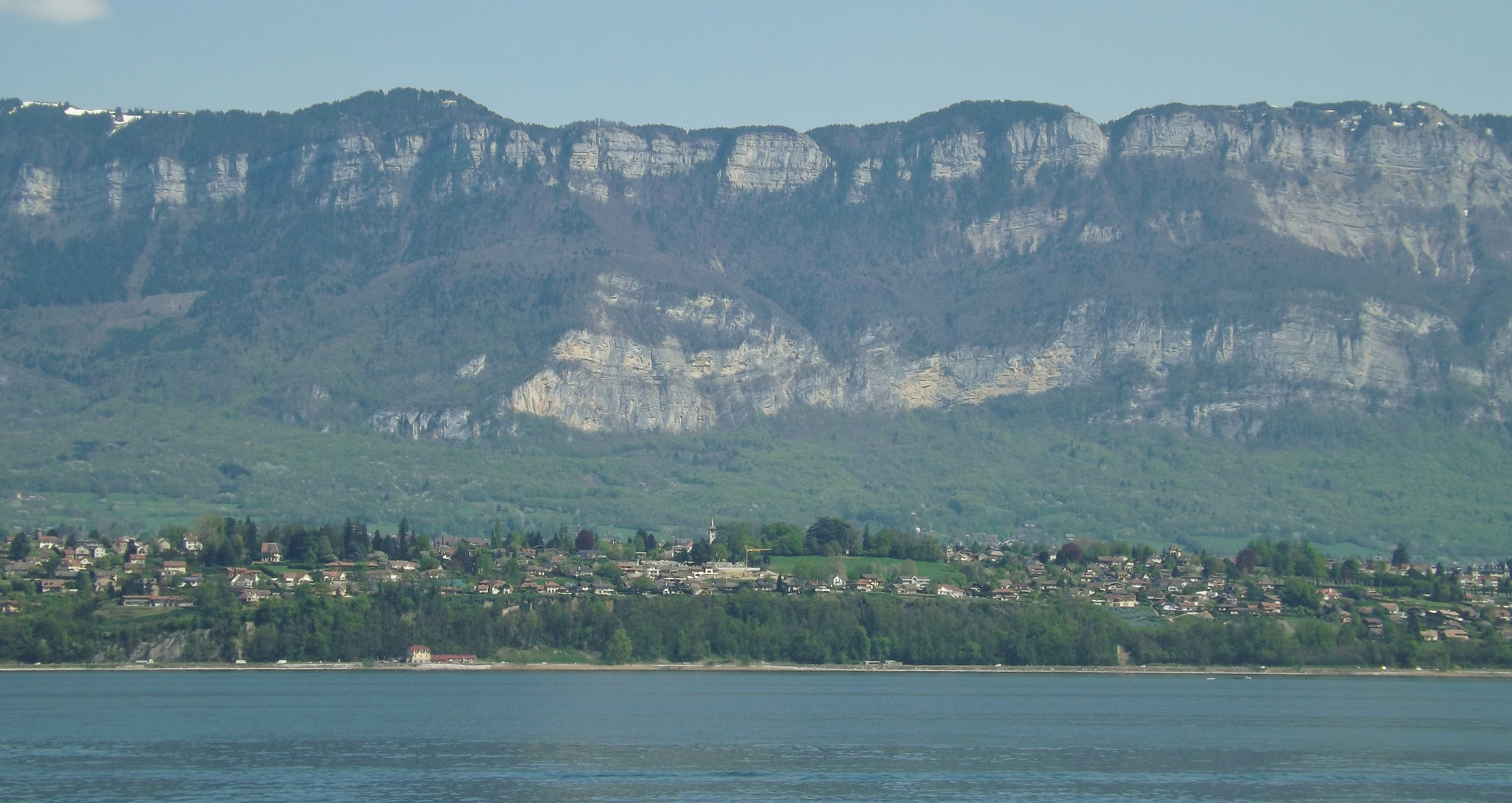
View of Tresserve

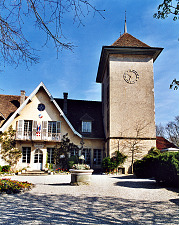
Tresserve town hall

== Population ==
Historical population
Year	Pop.	±% p.a.
1968	1,124	—
1975	1,457	+3.78%
1982	1,781	+2.91%
1990	2,806	+5.85%
1999	2,987	+0.70%
2007	3,161	+0.71%
2012	3,131	−0.19%
2017	3,014	−0.76%
2023	2,909	−0.59%
Source: INSEE

== Twin towns ==
Tresserve is twinned with:

- Avigliana, Italy

== See also ==
- Communes of the Savoie department

== World Heritage Site ==
Home to one or more prehistoric pile-dwelling (or stilt house) settlements that are part of the Prehistoric Pile dwellings around the Alps UNESCO World Heritage Site.
