= Ontex =

Ontex Nonté (Savoyard)
- Commune
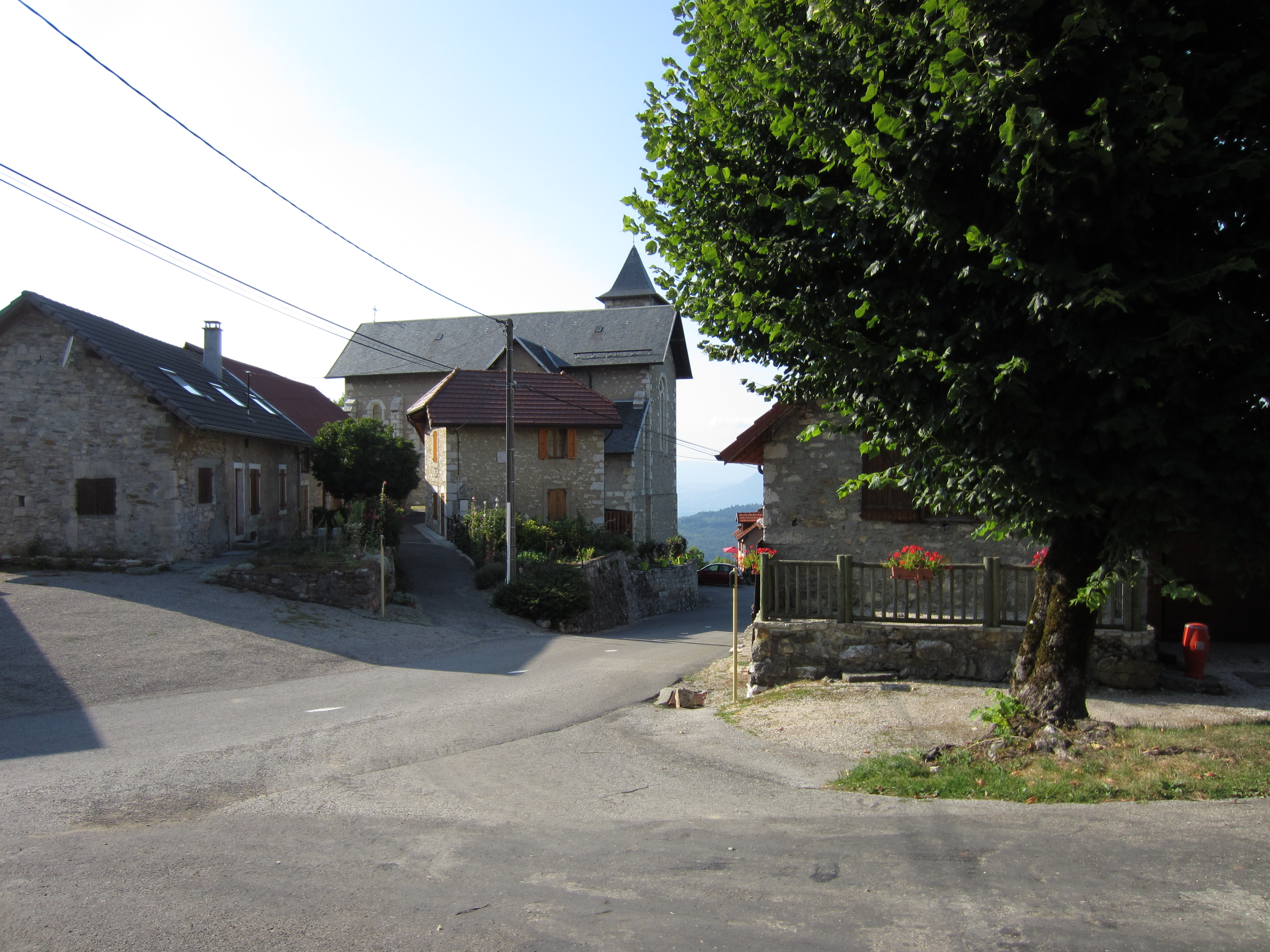
- A view in the centre of Ontex
- Location of Ontex
- Location within France Location within Auvergne-Rhône-Alpes
- Coordinates: 45°45′20″N 5°49′19″E
- Country: France
- Region: Auvergne-Rhône-Alpes
- Department: Savoie
- Arrondissement: Chambéry
- Canton: Bugey savoyard
- Intercommunality: CA Grand Lac

Government
  - Mayor (2023–2026): Christiane Carrier
- Area^{1}: 4.62 km^{2} (1.78 sq mi)
- Highest elevation: 1,161 m (3,809 ft)
- Lowest elevation: 452 m (1,483 ft)
- Population (2023): 84
  - Density: 18/km^{2} (47/sq mi)
- Time zone: UTC+01:00 (CET)
  - Summer (DST): UTC+02:00 (CEST)
- INSEE/Postal code: 73193 /73310
- ^{1} French Land Register data, which excludes lakes, ponds, glaciers > 1 km^{2} (0.386 sq mi or 247 acres) and river estuaries.

Ontex (Savoyard: Nonté) is a commune in the Savoie department in the Auvergne-Rhône-Alpes region in south-eastern France.

== Toponymy ==
As with many polysyllabic Arpitan toponyms or anthroponyms, the final -x marks oxytonic stress (on the last syllable), whereas the final -z indicates paroxytonic stress (on the penultimate syllable) and should not be pronounced, although in French it is often mispronounced due to hypercorrection.

== See also ==
- Communes of the Savoie department
