= Brison-Saint-Innocent =

Brison-Saint-Innocent Brizon (Savoyard)
- Commune
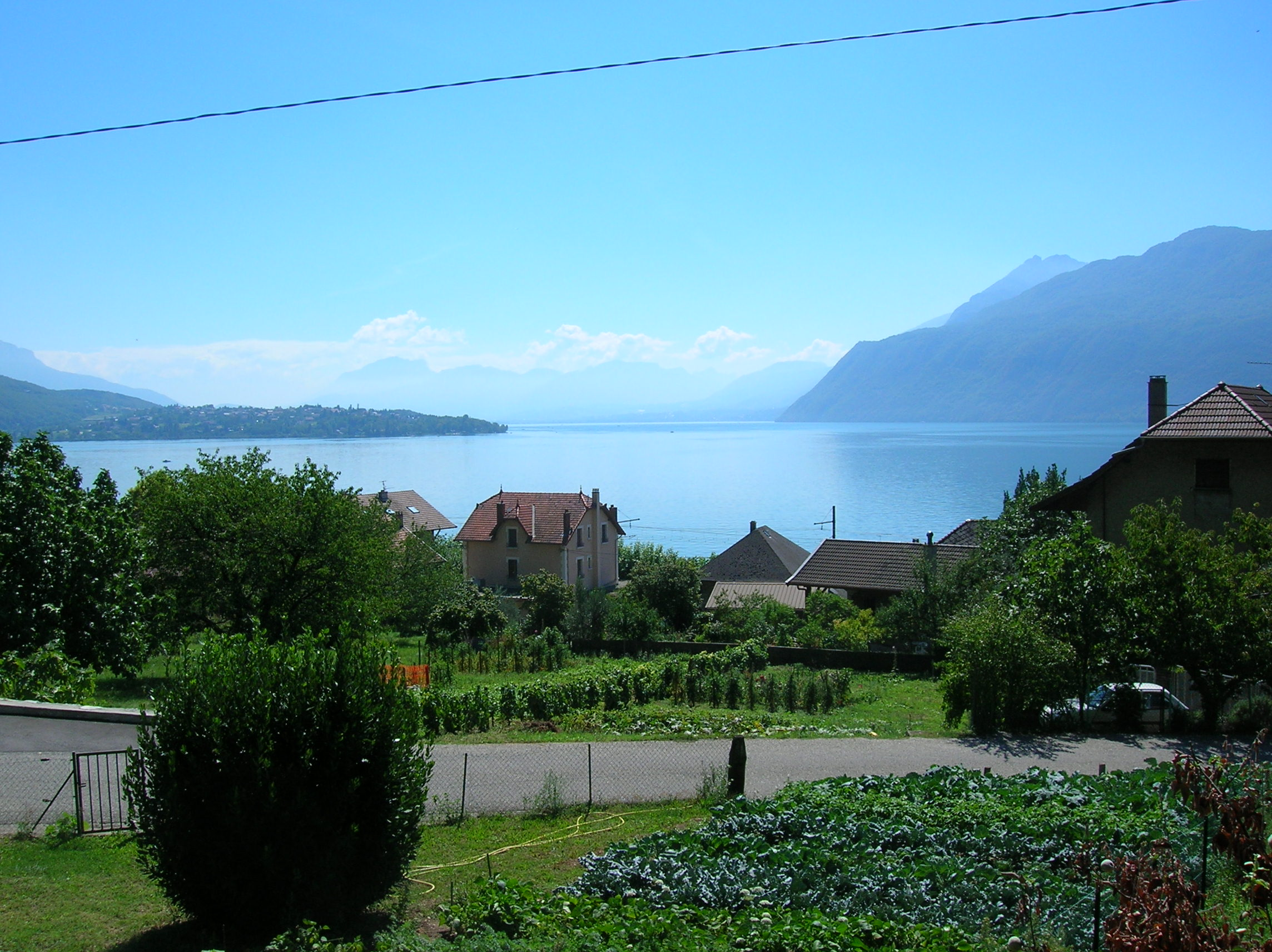
- Lac de Bourget

- Coat of arms
- Location of Brison-Saint-Innocent
- Location within France Location within Auvergne-Rhône-Alpes
- Coordinates: 45°43′25″N 5°53′29″E
- Country: France
- Region: Auvergne-Rhône-Alpes
- Department: Savoie
- Arrondissement: Chambéry
- Canton: Aix-les-Bains-1
- Intercommunality: CA Grand Lac

Government
  - Mayor (2020–2026): Jean-Claude Croze
- Area^{1}: 8.75 km^{2} (3.38 sq mi)
- Highest elevation: 840 m (2,760 ft)
- Lowest elevation: 228 m (748 ft)
- Population (2023): 2,445
  - Density: 279/km^{2} (724/sq mi)
- Time zone: UTC+01:00 (CET)
  - Summer (DST): UTC+02:00 (CEST)
- INSEE/Postal code: 73059 /73100
- Website: www.brison-st-innocent.fr
- ^{1} French Land Register data, which excludes lakes, ponds, glaciers > 1 km^{2} (0.386 sq mi or 247 acres) and river estuaries.

Brison-Saint-Innocent (Arpitan: Brizon) is a commune in the Savoie department in the Auvergne-Rhône-Alpes region in south-eastern France. It is part of the urban area of Chambéry.

== Population ==
Historical population
| Year | Pop. | ±% p.a. |
|---|---|---|
| 1968 | 1,056 | — |
| 1975 | 1,125 | +0.91% |
| 1982 | 1,223 | +1.20% |
| 1990 | 1,445 | +2.11% |
| 1999 | 1,864 | +2.87% |
| 2007 | 2,116 | +1.60% |
| 2012 | 2,175 | +0.55% |
| 2017 | 2,131 | −0.41% |
| 2023 | 2,445 | +2.32% |
Source: INSEE

== World Heritage Site ==
It is home to one or more prehistoric pile-dwelling (or stilt house) settlements that are part of the Prehistoric Pile dwellings around the Alps UNESCO World Heritage Site.

== See also ==
- Communes of the Savoie department
