= Motz =

Motz Môtz (Arpitan)
- Commune
- View of the commune from Grand Colombier
- Location of Motz
- Location within France Location within Auvergne-Rhône-Alpes
- Coordinates: 45°55′14″N 5°50′54″E
- Country: France
- Region: Auvergne-Rhône-Alpes
- Department: Savoie
- Arrondissement: Chambéry
- Canton: Bugey savoyard
- Intercommunality: CA Grand Lac

Government
  - Mayor (2020–2026): Daniel Clerc
- Area^{1}: 9.04 km^{2} (3.49 sq mi)
- Highest elevation: 1,044 m (3,425 ft)
- Lowest elevation: 240 m (790 ft)
- Population (2023): 482
  - Density: 53.3/km^{2} (138/sq mi)
- Time zone: UTC+01:00 (CET)
  - Summer (DST): UTC+02:00 (CEST)
- INSEE/Postal code: 73180 /73310
- ^{1} French Land Register data, which excludes lakes, ponds, glaciers > 1 km^{2} (0.386 sq mi or 247 acres) and river estuaries.

Motz (French pronunciation: [mo]; Arpitan: Môtz) is a commune in the Savoie department in the Auvergne-Rhône-Alpes region in south-eastern France.

== Geography ==
The Fier river forms most of the commune's northern border. The Rhône forms the commune's western border.

== See also ==
- Communes of the Savoie department
