= Saint-Offenge =

- Commune
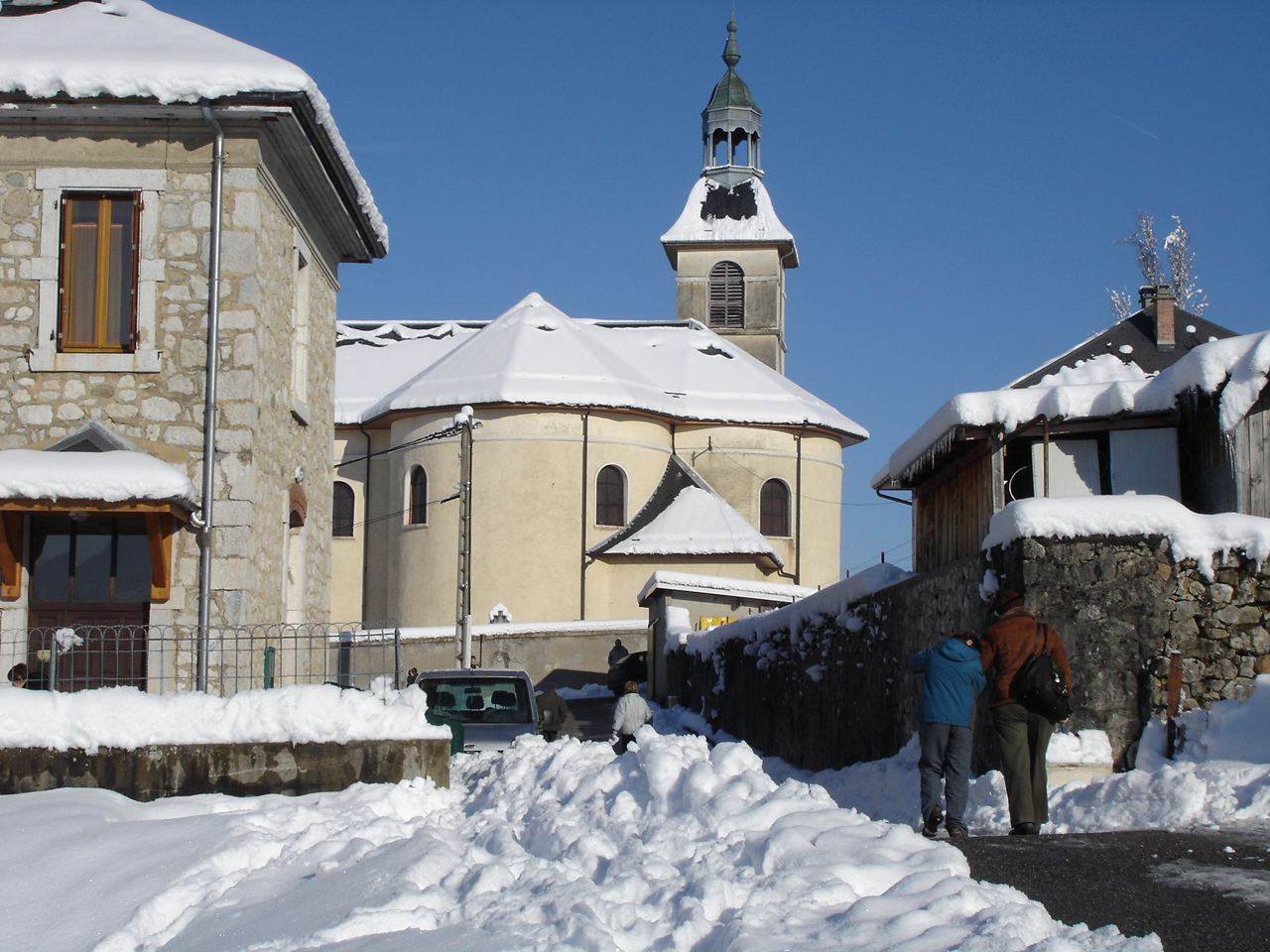
- The church in Saint-Offenge-Dessous
- Location of Saint-Offenge
- Location within France Location within Auvergne-Rhône-Alpes
- Coordinates: 45°43′39″N 6°00′23″E
- Country: France
- Region: Auvergne-Rhône-Alpes
- Department: Savoie
- Arrondissement: Chambéry
- Canton: Aix-les-Bains-1
- Intercommunality: CA Grand Lac

Government
  - Mayor (2020–2026): Bernard Gelloz
- Area^{1}: 15.63 km^{2} (6.03 sq mi)
- Highest elevation: 1,449 m (4,754 ft)
- Lowest elevation: 404 m (1,325 ft)
- Population (2023): 1,179
  - Density: 75.43/km^{2} (195.4/sq mi)
- Time zone: UTC+01:00 (CET)
  - Summer (DST): UTC+02:00 (CEST)
- INSEE/Postal code: 73263 /73100
- ^{1} French Land Register data, which excludes lakes, ponds, glaciers > 1 km^{2} (0.386 sq mi or 247 acres) and river estuaries.

Saint-Offenge (French pronunciation: [sɛ̃t‿ɔfɑ̃ʒ]) is a commune in the Savoie department in the Auvergne-Rhône-Alpes region in south-eastern France. It is the result of the merger, on 1 January 2015, of the communes of Saint-Offenge-Dessous and Saint-Offenge-Dessus.

== Population ==
Populations of the area corresponding with the commune of Saint-Offenge at 1 January 2025.

Historical population
Year	Pop.	±% p.a.
1968	389	—
1975	349	−1.54%
1982	449	+3.66%
1990	621	+4.14%
1999	707	+1.45%
2007	828	+1.99%
2012	970	+3.22%
2017	1,104	+2.62%
2023	1,179	+1.10%
Source: INSEE

== See also ==
- Communes of the Savoie department
