= Montcel, Savoie =

Montcel Moncél (Savoyard)
- Commune
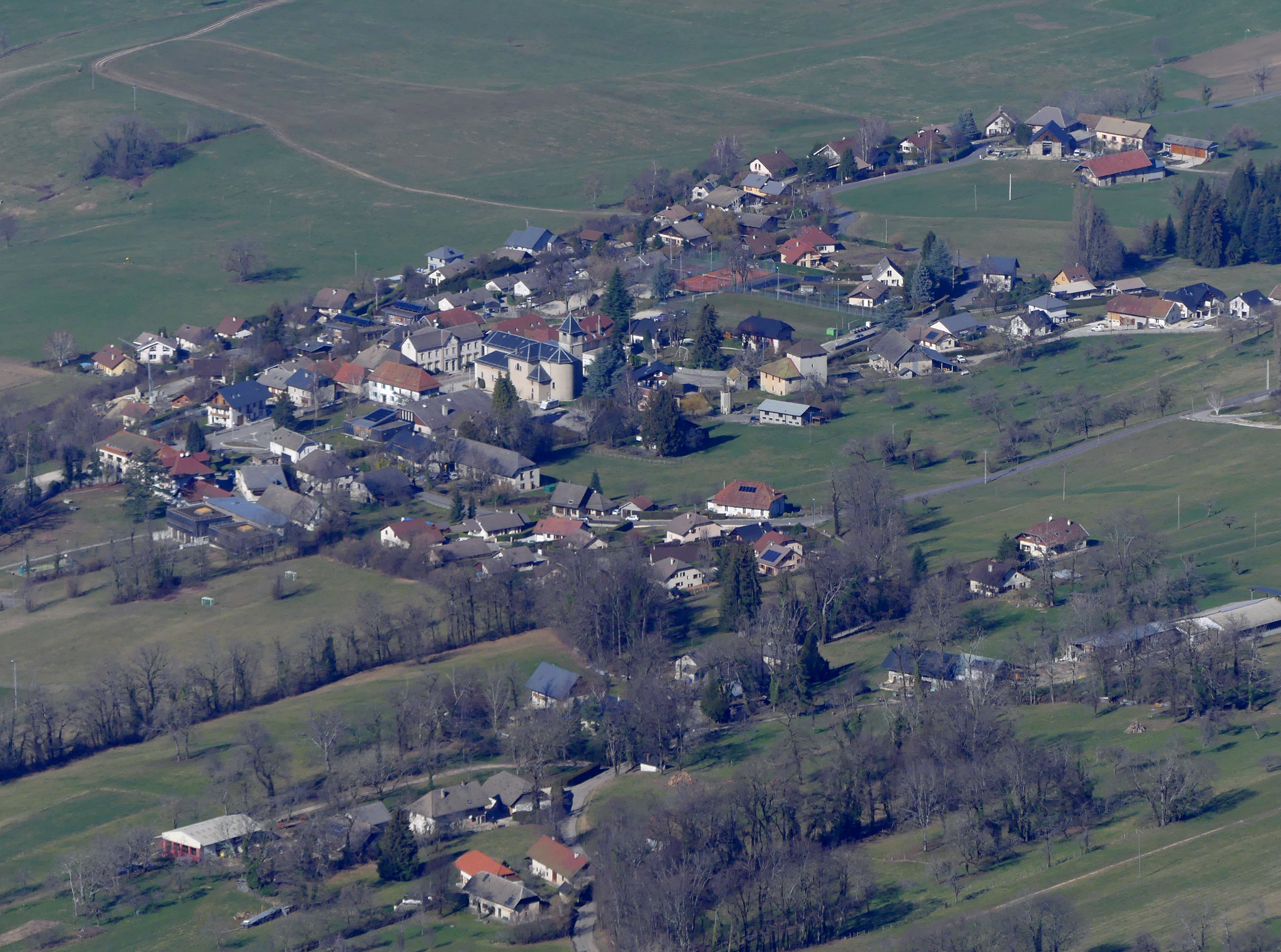
- Location of Montcel
- Location within France Location within Auvergne-Rhône-Alpes
- Coordinates: 45°43′26″N 5°59′02″E
- Country: France
- Region: Auvergne-Rhône-Alpes
- Department: Savoie
- Arrondissement: Chambéry
- Canton: Aix-les-Bains-1
- Intercommunality: CA Grand Lac

Government
  - Mayor (2020–2026): Antoine Huynh
- Area^{1}: 15.23 km^{2} (5.88 sq mi)
- Highest elevation: 1,563 m (5,128 ft)
- Lowest elevation: 371 m (1,217 ft)
- Population (2023): 1,111
  - Density: 72.95/km^{2} (188.9/sq mi)
- Time zone: UTC+01:00 (CET)
  - Summer (DST): UTC+02:00 (CEST)
- INSEE/Postal code: 73164 /73100
- ^{1} French Land Register data, which excludes lakes, ponds, glaciers > 1 km^{2} (0.386 sq mi or 247 acres) and river estuaries.

Montcel (French pronunciation: [mɔ̃sɛl]; Savoyard: Moncél) is a commune in the Savoie department in the Auvergne-Rhône-Alpes region in south-eastern France.

== See also ==
- Communes of the Savoie department
