= Mont Revard =

Mountain in France

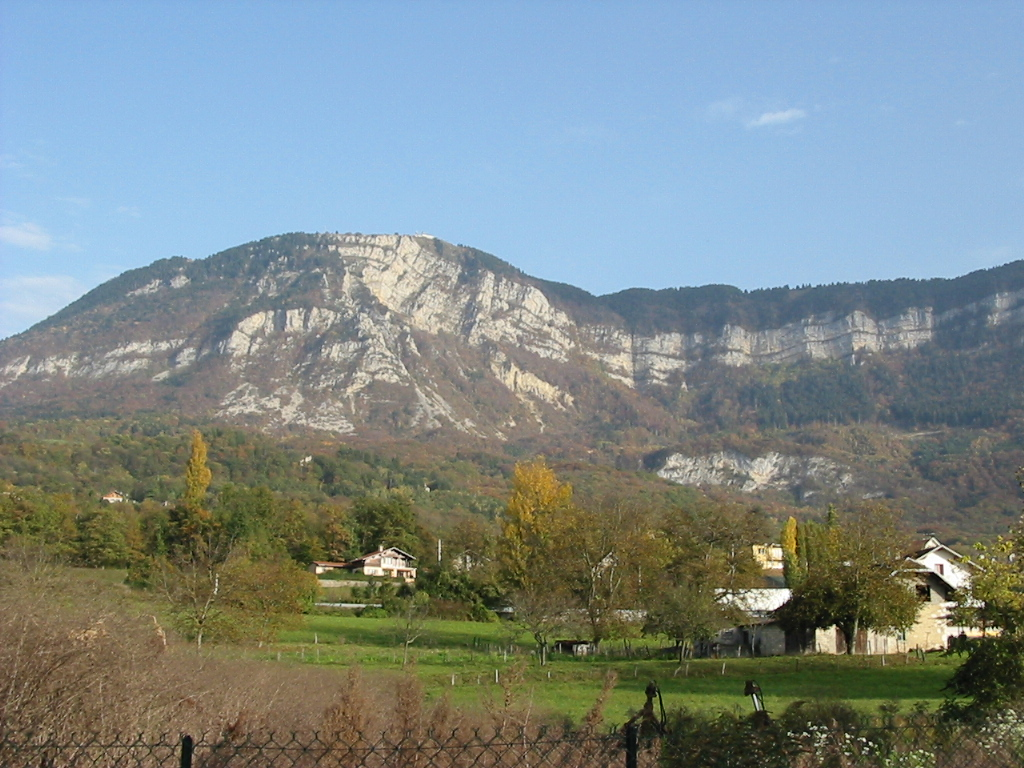

Highest point
- Elevation: 1,562 m (5,125 ft)
- Coordinates: 45°40′55″N 05°58′32″E

Geography
- Location within France
- Location: Savoie, France
- Parent range: Bauges

Mont Revard (French pronunciation: [mɔ̃ ʁəvaʁ]) is a mountain in the Bauges Massif near Aix-les-Bains in Savoie, France with an elevation of 1,562 m (5,125 ft). The mountain is crossed by the D913 road between the villages of Saint-Jean-d'Arvey and Pugny-Chatenod near Aix-les-Bains. The ski resort of Le Revard is situated on the northern edge of the mountain at an elevation of 1,537 m (5,043 ft).

The summit of D913 has an elevation of 1,463 m (4,800 ft) and was crossed on the penultimate stage of the 2013 Tour de France (Stage 20). The Tour de France has crossed the pass twice previously and has had a stage finish twice on the summit.

== Climate ==
Mont Revard features a warm-summer humid continental climate (Köppen: Dfb) due to its altitude and far inland position.

Located at the western end of the French Alps, Mont Revard receives a lot of precipitation over the year and significant accumulations of snow - up to 8 m (26 ft 3 in) during the winter of 2012–2013. Summers are quite warm and sunny and thunderstorms are not uncommon. Winters are very cold and snowy.

Climate data for (1994–2014 averages)
Month	Jan	Feb	Mar	Apr	May	Jun	Jul	Aug	Sep	Oct	Nov	Dec	Year
Mean daily maximum °C (°F)	0.3 (32.5)	1.4 (34.5)	5.6 (42.1)	9.0 (48.2)	13.3 (55.9)	17.1 (62.8)	19.8 (67.6)	19.2 (66.6)	16.0 (60.8)	10.5 (50.9)	4.6 (40.3)	1.0 (33.8)	9.8 (49.7)
Daily mean °C (°F)	−3.3 (26.1)	−2.4 (27.7)	1.1 (34.0)	4.4 (39.9)	8.3 (46.9)	11.8 (53.2)	14.2 (57.6)	13.6 (56.5)	11.1 (52.0)	6.4 (43.5)	1.5 (34.7)	−2.2 (28.0)	5.4 (41.7)
Mean daily minimum °C (°F)	−6.8 (19.8)	−6.2 (20.8)	−3.3 (26.1)	−0.2 (31.6)	3.4 (38.1)	6.6 (43.9)	8.7 (47.7)	8.4 (47.1)	6.4 (43.5)	2.4 (36.3)	−2.0 (28.4)	−5.3 (22.5)	1.0 (33.8)
Average precipitation mm (inches)	89 (3.5)	59 (2.3)	77 (3.0)	95 (3.7)	117 (4.6)	86 (3.4)	65 (2.6)	87 (3.4)	142 (5.6)	125 (4.9)	91 (3.6)	80 (3.1)	1,113 (43.7)
Average precipitation days	13	11	12	14	14	12	9	10	12	13	12	12	144
Source: Weather, forecasts, history, risks in Le Mont Revard, Rhône-Alpes, France

== Details of the climb ==
In 2013, the climb used by the Tour de France commenced at Saint-Jean-d'Arvey and climbs 866 m (2,841 ft) in 15.9 km (9.9 mi) at an average gradient of 5.6%, and was ranked a Category 1 climb.

From Aix-les-Bains, the climb to the ski resort at Le Revard via the D913 is 21.4 km (13.3 mi) long, climbing 1,277 m (4,190 ft) at an average gradient of 6%. From Chambery, the climb via the D912/D913 is 25.0 km (15.5 mi) long with 1,267 m (4,157 ft) height gained at an average of 5.1%.

== Caving ==
The limestone plateau is conducive to karst formations. Some pit caves (called 'tannes') are connected to underground networks such as the Garde-Cavale network, accessible from the Trou du Garde and the Creux de la Cavale. More than 50 km of this network has been explored. The waters, whose flow varies from 14 to 7,000 litres per second, come out at the Doria cave, which is visible from Chambéry.

== Tour de France ==
The mountain was included in the route of the 1991 Tour de France and again in 1998, however the latter stage was cancelled in the wake of the 1998 Festina affair.

In 1965 and 1972, the ski resort of Le Revard was used as a stage finish, with the finishing line being situated at 1,500 m (4,921 ft). The 1965 stage was a mountain time trial won by Felice Gimondi.

=== Appearances in Tour de France ===
Year	Stage	Category	Start	Finish	Leader at the summit
2013	20	1	Annecy	Annecy Semnoz	Jens Voigt (GER)
1998	17	1	Albertville	Aix-les-Bains	Stage neutralized
1991	19	2	Morzine	Aix-les-Bains	Pascal Richard (SUI)

=== Tour de France stage finishes ===
Year	Stage	Start of stage	Distance (km)	Category	Stage winner	Yellow jersey
1972	15	Aix-les-Bains	28	1	Cyrille Guimard (FRA)	Eddy Merckx (BEL)
1965	18	Aix-les-Bains	26.9	1 (ITT)	Felice Gimondi (ITA)	Felice Gimondi (ITA)
