= Canton of Aix-les-Bains-2 =

Coordinates: 45.69°N 5.91°E

The canton of Aix-les-Bains-2 is an administrative division of the Savoie department, southeastern France. It was created at the French canton reorganisation which came into effect in March 2015. Its seat is in Aix-les-Bains.

It consists of the following communes:

1. Aix-les-Bains (partly)
2. Mouxy
3. Tresserve
