= La Biolle =

- Commune
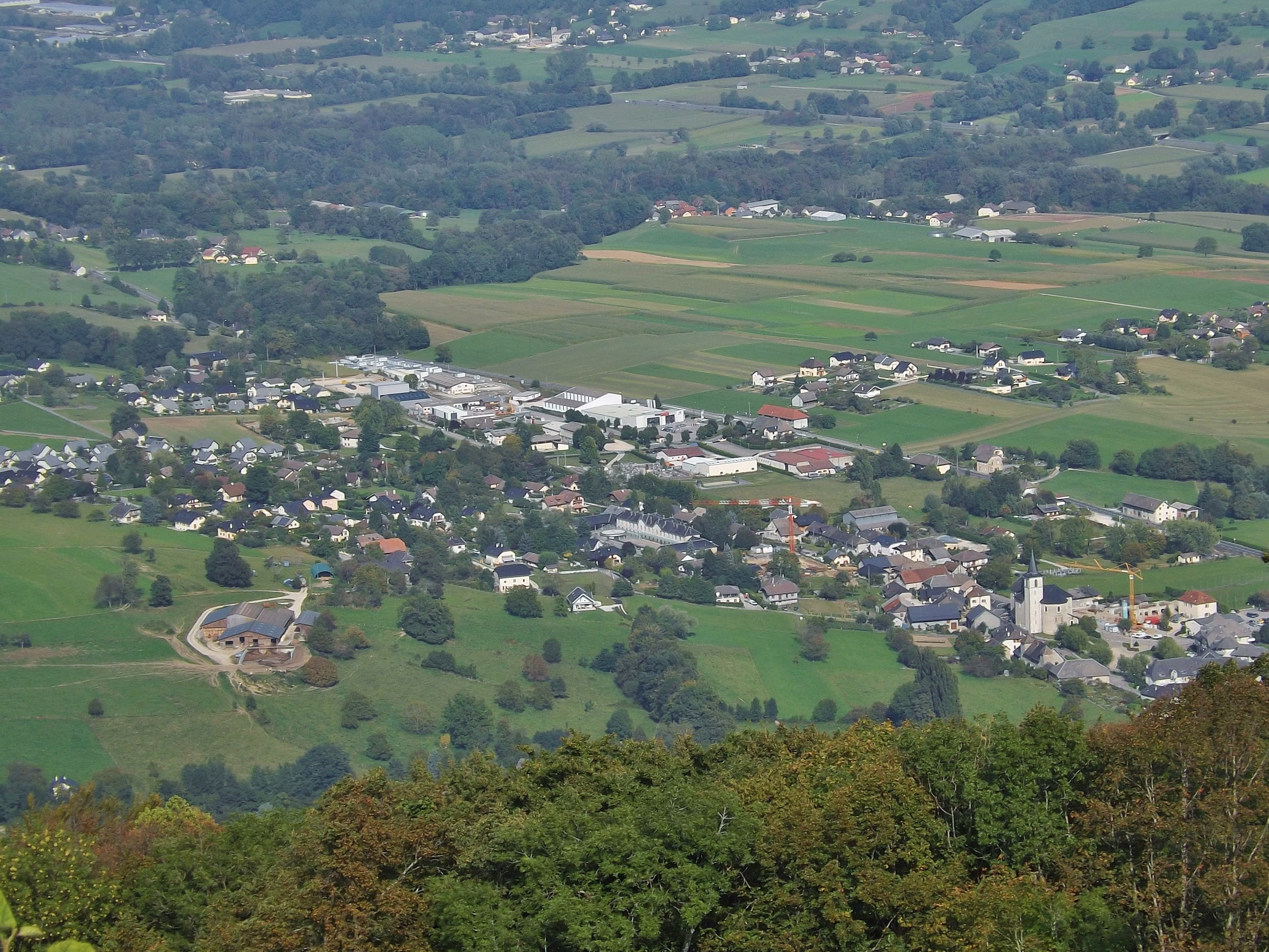
- A general view of La Biolle

- Coat of arms
- Location of La Biolle
- Location within France Location within Auvergne-Rhône-Alpes
- Coordinates: 45°45′24″N 5°55′47″E
- Country: France
- Region: Auvergne-Rhône-Alpes
- Department: Savoie
- Arrondissement: Chambéry
- Canton: Aix-les-Bains-1
- Intercommunality: CA Grand Lac

Government
  - Mayor (2020–2026): Julie Novelli
- Area^{1}: 13.04 km^{2} (5.03 sq mi)
- Highest elevation: 849 m (2,785 ft)
- Lowest elevation: 300 m (980 ft)
- Population (2023): 2,948
  - Density: 226.1/km^{2} (585.5/sq mi)
- Demonym: Biollans
- Time zone: UTC+01:00 (CET)
  - Summer (DST): UTC+02:00 (CEST)
- INSEE/Postal code: 73043 /73410
- Website: www.la-biolle.fr
- ^{1} French Land Register data, which excludes lakes, ponds, glaciers > 1 km^{2} (0.386 sq mi or 247 acres) and river estuaries.

La Biolle (French pronunciation: [la bjɔl]; Arpitan: La Byôla) is a commune in the Savoie department in the Auvergne-Rhône-Alpes region in south-eastern France.

== Population ==
Historical population
| Year | Pop. | ±% p.a. |
|---|---|---|
| 1968 | 812 | — |
| 1975 | 861 | +0.84% |
| 1982 | 1,074 | +3.21% |
| 1990 | 1,353 | +2.93% |
| 1999 | 1,760 | +2.97% |
| 2007 | 2,143 | +2.49% |
| 2012 | 2,201 | +0.54% |
| 2017 | 2,578 | +3.21% |
| 2023 | 2,948 | +2.26% |
Source: INSEE

== See also ==
- Communes of the Savoie department
