= Communauté d'agglomération Grand Lac =

Grand Lac
- Communauté d'agglomération
- Interactive map of Grand Lac
- Coordinates: 45°45′N 05°54′E
- Country: France
- Region: Auvergne-Rhône-Alpes
- Department: Savoie
- No. of communes: {{{nbcomm}}}
- Established: 2017
- Area: 300.0 km^{2} (115.8 sq mi)
- Population (2019): 76,759
  - Density: 255.9/km^{2} (662.7/sq mi)
- Website: grand-lac.fr

Communauté d'agglomération Grand Lac is the communauté d'agglomération, an intercommunal structure, centred on the town of Aix-les-Bains. It is located in the Savoie department, in the Auvergne-Rhône-Alpes region, southeastern France. Created in 2017, its seat is in Aix-les-Bains. The name Grand Lac refers to the Lac du Bourget. Its area is 300.0 km^{2}. Its population was 76,759 in 2019, of which 30,463 in Aix-les-Bains proper.

== Composition ==
The communauté d'agglomération consists of the following 28 communes:

1. Aix-les-Bains
2. La Biolle
3. Bourdeau
4. Le Bourget-du-Lac
5. Brison-Saint-Innocent
6. Chanaz
7. La Chapelle-du-Mont-du-Chat
8. Chindrieux
9. Conjux
10. Drumettaz-Clarafond
11. Entrelacs
12. Grésy-sur-Aix
13. Méry
14. Montcel
15. Motz
16. Mouxy
17. Ontex
18. Pugny-Chatenod
19. Ruffieux
20. Saint-Offenge
21. Saint-Ours
22. Saint-Pierre-de-Curtille
23. Serrières-en-Chautagne
24. Tresserve
25. Trévignin
26. Vions
27. Viviers-du-Lac
28. Voglans
