= Saint-Ours, Savoie =

Saint-Ours Sant-O (Savoyard)
- Commune
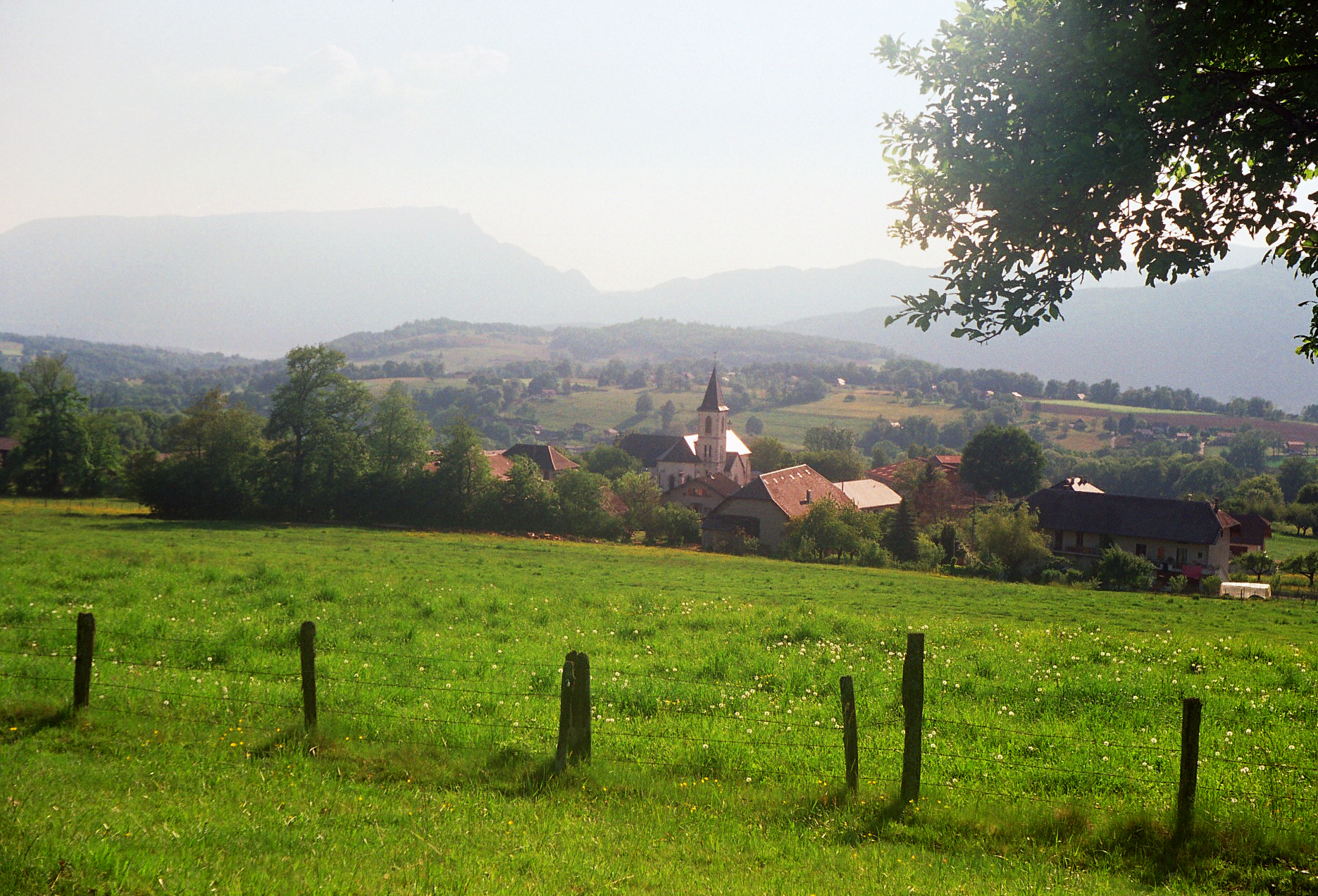
- A general view of Saint-Ours
- Location of Saint-Ours
- Location within France Location within Auvergne-Rhône-Alpes
- Coordinates: 45°45′30″N 5°59′21″E
- Country: France
- Region: Auvergne-Rhône-Alpes
- Department: Savoie
- Arrondissement: Chambéry
- Canton: Aix-les-Bains-1
- Intercommunality: CA Grand Lac

Government
  - Mayor (2020–2026): Louis Allard
- Area^{1}: 4.59 km^{2} (1.77 sq mi)
- Highest elevation: 690 m (2,260 ft)
- Lowest elevation: 432 m (1,417 ft)
- Population (2023): 775
  - Density: 169/km^{2} (437/sq mi)
- Time zone: UTC+01:00 (CET)
  - Summer (DST): UTC+02:00 (CEST)
- INSEE/Postal code: 73265 /73410
- ^{1} French Land Register data, which excludes lakes, ponds, glaciers > 1 km^{2} (0.386 sq mi or 247 acres) and river estuaries.

Saint-Ours (French pronunciation: [sɛ̃.t‿uʁs]; Savoyard: Sant-O) is a commune in the Savoie department in the Auvergne-Rhône-Alpes region in south-eastern France.

The commune hosts the festival La fête de la bâteuse.

== See also ==
- Communes of the Savoie department
