= Drumettaz-Clarafond =

Drumettaz-Clarafond Dremèta (Arpitan)
- Commune
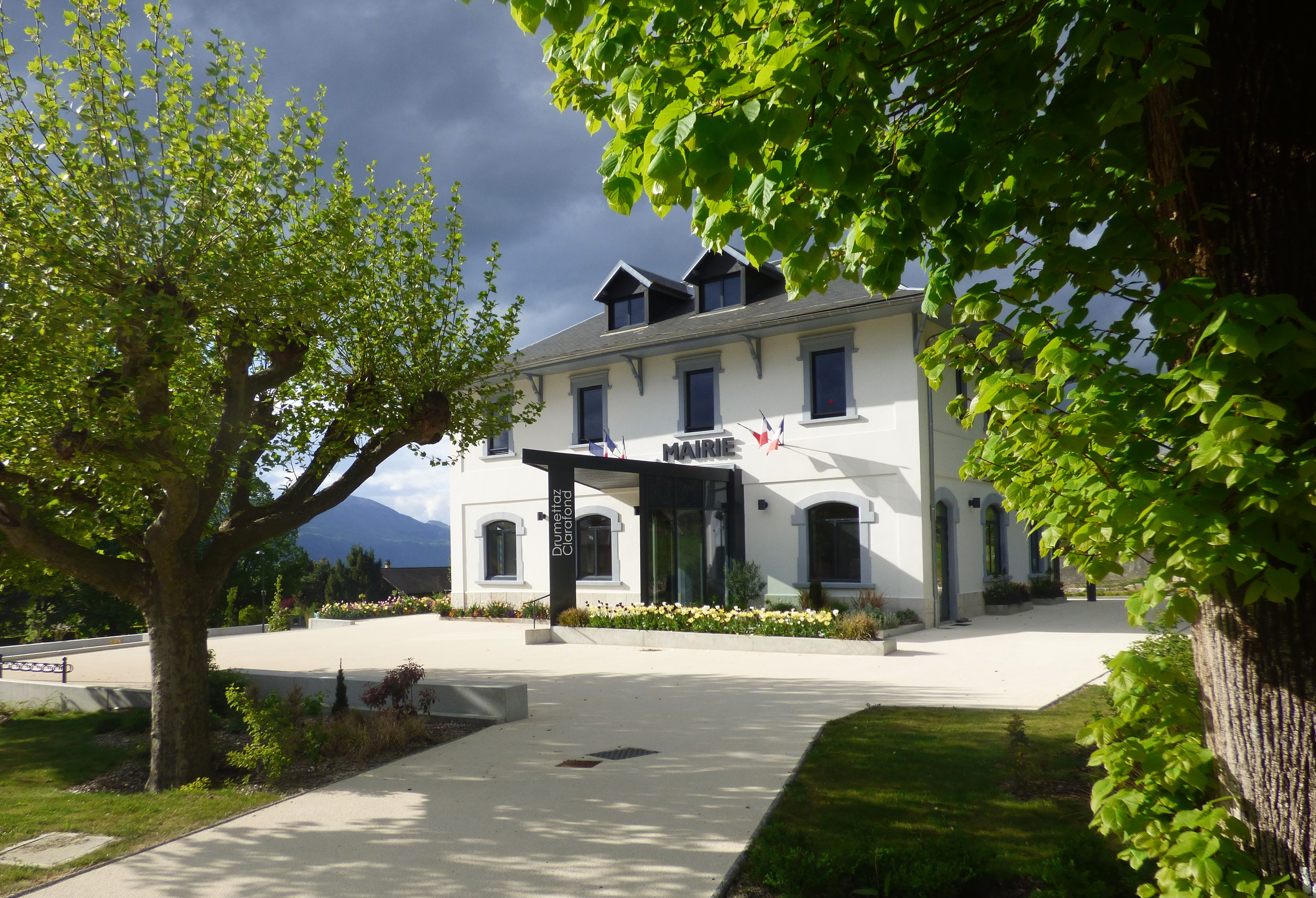
- Town hall
- Location of Drumettaz-Clarafond
- Location within France Location within Auvergne-Rhône-Alpes
- Coordinates: 45°39′35″N 5°56′16″E
- Country: France
- Region: Auvergne-Rhône-Alpes
- Department: Savoie
- Arrondissement: Chambéry
- Canton: La Motte-Servolex
- Intercommunality: CA Grand Lac

Government
  - Mayor (2020–2026): Nicolas Jacquier
- Area^{1}: 11.38 km^{2} (4.39 sq mi)
- Highest elevation: 1,513 m (4,964 ft)
- Lowest elevation: 257 m (843 ft)
- Population (2023): 3,012
  - Density: 264.7/km^{2} (685.5/sq mi)
- Time zone: UTC+01:00 (CET)
  - Summer (DST): UTC+02:00 (CEST)
- INSEE/Postal code: 73103 /73420
- Website: www.drumettaz-clarafond.com
- ^{1} French Land Register data, which excludes lakes, ponds, glaciers > 1 km^{2} (0.386 sq mi or 247 acres) and river estuaries.

Drumettaz-Clarafond (French pronunciation: [dʁymɛta klaʁafɔ̃]; Arpitan: Dremèta) is a commune in the Savoie department in the Auvergne-Rhône-Alpes region in south-eastern France.

== Toponymy ==
As with many polysyllabic Arpitan toponyms or anthroponyms, the final -x marks oxytonic stress (on the last syllable), whereas the final -z indicates paroxytonic stress (on the penultimate syllable) and should not be pronounced, although in French it is often mispronounced due to hypercorrection.

== Population ==
Historical population
Year	Pop.	±% p.a.
1968	1,182	—
1975	1,234	+0.62%
1982	1,410	+1.92%
1990	1,712	+2.46%
1999	1,966	+1.55%
2007	2,315	+2.06%
2012	2,503	+1.57%
2017	2,807	+2.32%
2023	3,012	+1.18%
Source: INSEE

== See also ==
- Communes of the Savoie department
