= Saint-Pierre-de-Curtille =

- Commune
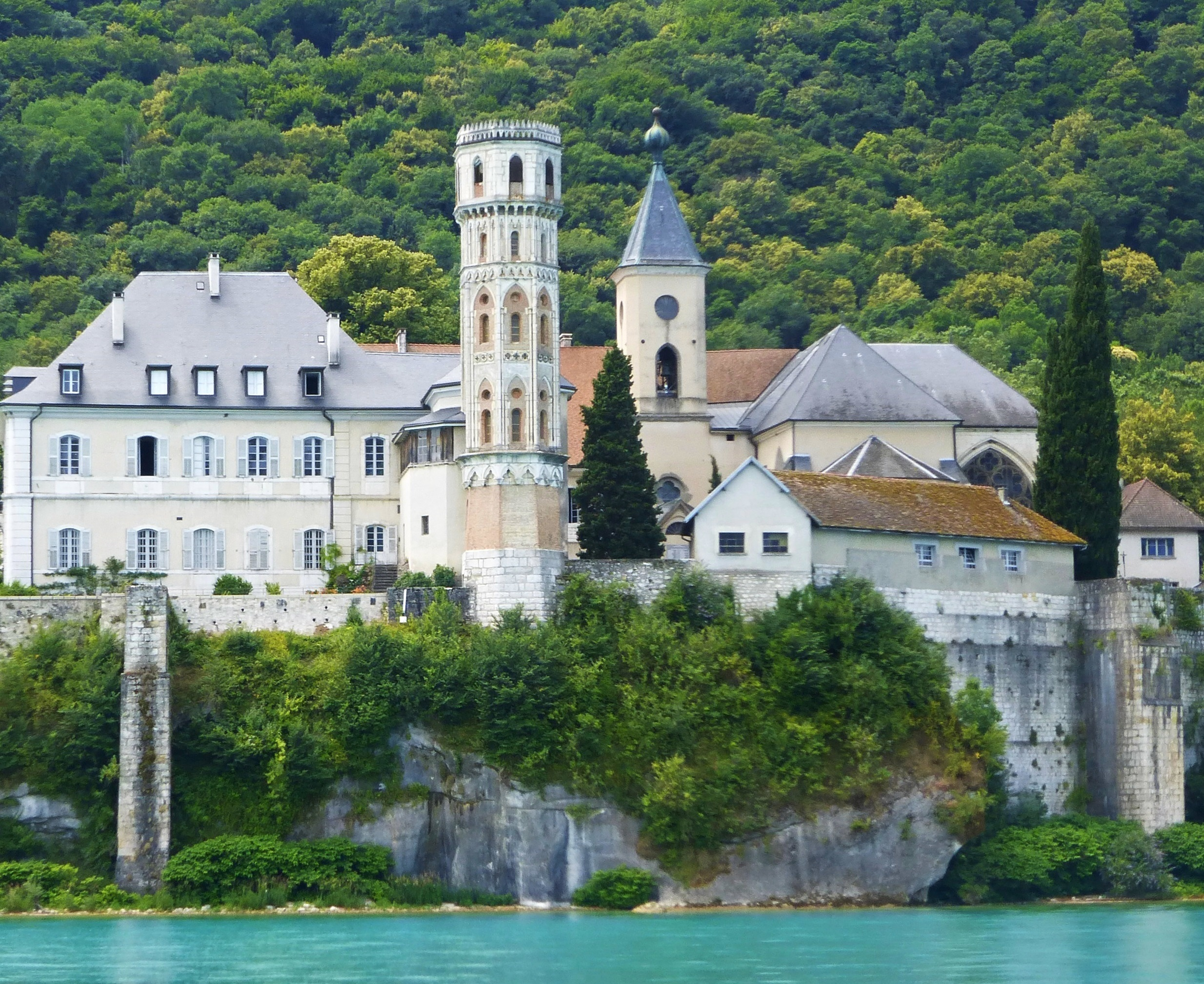
- Hautecombe Abbey
- Location of Saint-Pierre-de-Curtille
- Location within France Location within Auvergne-Rhône-Alpes
- Coordinates: 45°46′35″N 5°48′43″E
- Country: France
- Region: Auvergne-Rhône-Alpes
- Department: Savoie
- Arrondissement: Chambéry
- Canton: Bugey savoyard
- Intercommunality: CA Grand Lac

Government
  - Mayor (2020–2026): Gérard Dillenschneider
- Area^{1}: 9.75 km^{2} (3.76 sq mi)
- Highest elevation: 621 m (2,037 ft)
- Lowest elevation: 229 m (751 ft)
- Population (2023): 472
  - Density: 48.4/km^{2} (125/sq mi)
- Time zone: UTC+01:00 (CET)
  - Summer (DST): UTC+02:00 (CEST)
- INSEE/Postal code: 73273 /73310
- ^{1} French Land Register data, which excludes lakes, ponds, glaciers > 1 km^{2} (0.386 sq mi or 247 acres) and river estuaries.

Saint-Pierre-de-Curtille is a commune in the Savoie department in the Auvergne-Rhône-Alpes region in south-eastern France. It is situated near the northwestern shore of Lac du Bourget.

== Heritage sites ==
It is home to a prehistoric pile-dwelling (or stilt house) settlement that is part of the Prehistoric Pile dwellings around the Alps UNESCO World Heritage Site. These dwellings, now submerged in the Lac du Bourget, date from the 4th millennium BCE.

The Hautecombe Abbey, situated on the lake shore, has been a classified monument since 1875.

== See also ==
- Communes of the Savoie department
