= Canton of Aix-les-Bains-1 =

Coordinates: 45.70°N 5.90°E

The canton of Aix-les-Bains-1 is an administrative division of the Savoie department, southeastern France. It was created at the French canton reorganisation which came into effect in March 2015. Its seat is in Aix-les-Bains.

It consists of the following communes:

1. Aix-les-Bains (partly)
2. La Biolle
3. Brison-Saint-Innocent
4. Entrelacs
5. Grésy-sur-Aix
6. Montcel
7. Pugny-Chatenod
8. Saint-Offenge
9. Saint-Ours
10. Trévignin
