= Pugny-Chatenod =

Pugny-Chatenod Pounyi (Savoyard)
- Commune
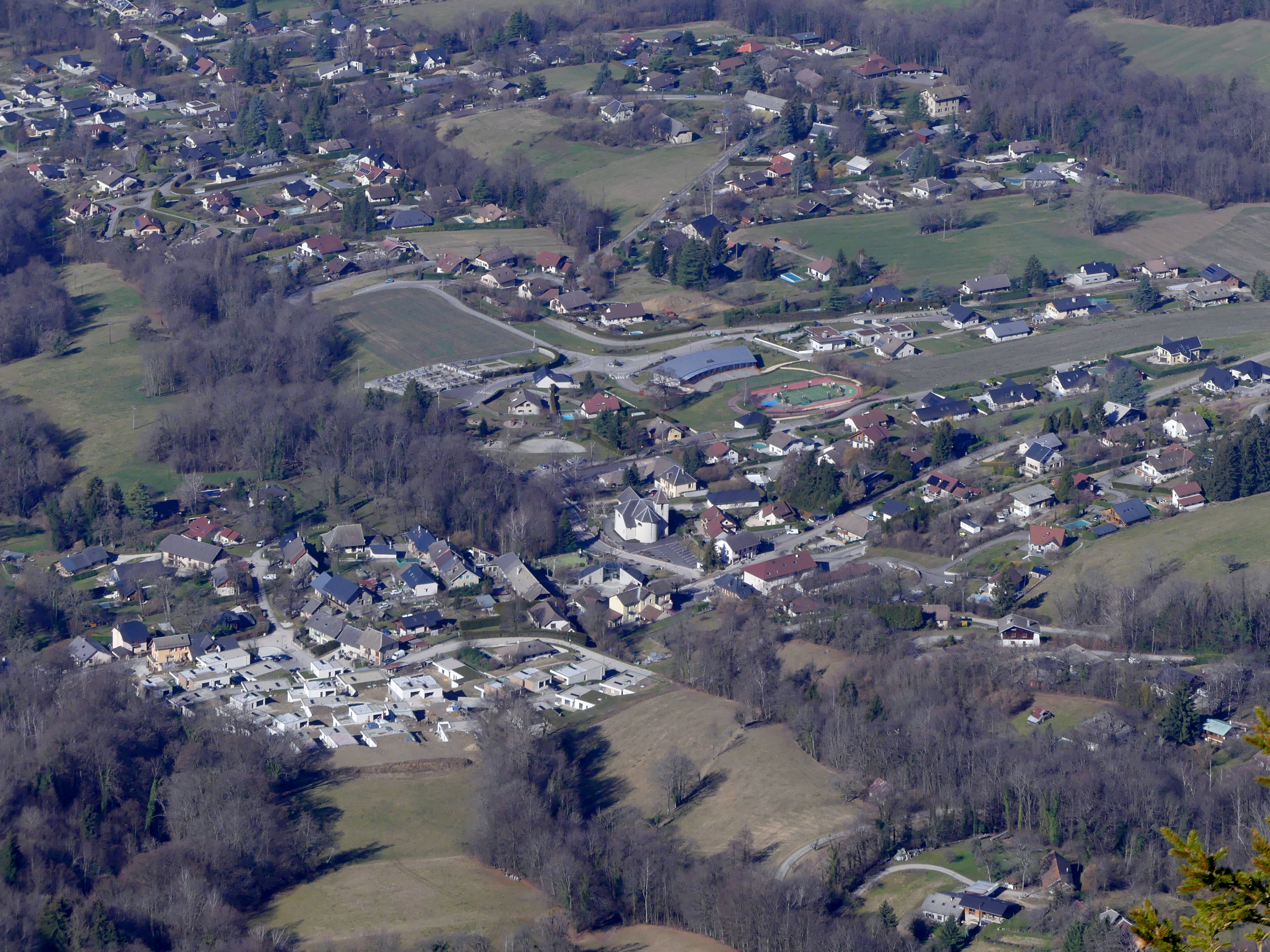
- Location of Pugny-Chatenod
- Location within France Location within Auvergne-Rhône-Alpes
- Coordinates: 45°41′46″N 5°57′18″E
- Country: France
- Region: Auvergne-Rhône-Alpes
- Department: Savoie
- Arrondissement: Chambéry
- Canton: Aix-les-Bains-1
- Intercommunality: CA Grand Lac

Government
  - Mayor (2022–2026): Bruno Crouzevialle
- Area^{1}: 5.36 km^{2} (2.07 sq mi)
- Highest elevation: 1,539 m (5,049 ft)
- Lowest elevation: 380 m (1,250 ft)
- Population (2023): 1,071
  - Density: 200/km^{2} (518/sq mi)
- Time zone: UTC+01:00 (CET)
  - Summer (DST): UTC+02:00 (CEST)
- INSEE/Postal code: 73208 /73100
- Website: www.pugny-chatenod.fr
- ^{1} French Land Register data, which excludes lakes, ponds, glaciers > 1 km^{2} (0.386 sq mi or 247 acres) and river estuaries.

Pugny-Chatenod (French pronunciation: [pyɲi ʃatno]; Savoyard: Pounyi) is a commune in the Savoie department in the Auvergne-Rhône-Alpes region in south-eastern France. It is part of the urban area of Chambéry.

== See also ==
- Communes of the Savoie department
