= Savoie Propre =

Historical and natural region in Savoie, France

Savoie Propre is a natural and historical region of Savoie, France. Historically, it was a pagus in the Burgundian Kingdom (pagus Savogensis), later a bailliage, and subsequently an administrative province (from 1723 to 1860) within the territorial organization of the County of Savoy and the Duchy of Savoy.

The region is sometimes referred to as Savoie Ducale due to the presence of Chambéry, the capital of the Duchy of Savoy from 1295 to 1563, or as Lower Savoie (French: Savoie basse).

== Geography ==
The province of Savoie Propre roughly corresponds to the modern Arrondissement of Chambéry. It encompasses regions such as Beaufortain with Beaufort-sur-Doron, the Bauges with Le Châtelard, the Combe de Savoie with Montmélian, the Bourget Valley with Chambéry and Aix-les-Bains, the Avant-pays savoyard, and the Albanais with Rumilly (partially shared with modern Haute-Savoie).

It is bordered to the west by the former pagus Bellicensis (Bugey), to the east by Tarentaise, to the south by Dauphiné and Viennois, and to the north by the pagus minor albanensis, the Pays de l'Albanais, and the Genevois.

== History ==
The history of Savoie Propre is largely covered in the History of Savoy article. This section focuses on aspects specific to this province.

=== Burgundian origins ===
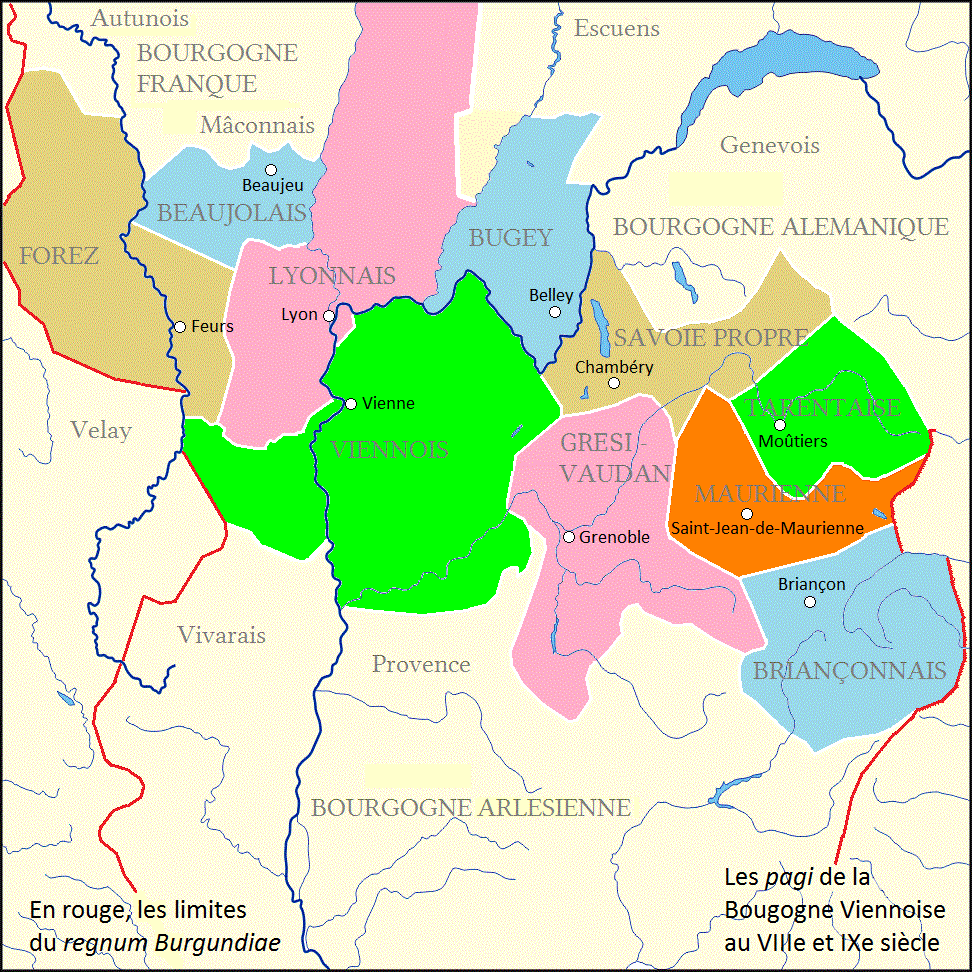
Pagi of the Viennoise Burgundy during the Carolingian era.

Savoie Propre, known as the pagus Savogensis, first appeared in the 9th century within the Kingdom of Burgundy, specifically in the cisjurane Burgundy. As the heart of the Humbertian state, it later merged with the County of Savoy, though the title and territorial scope eventually extended beyond the current region.

The region is mentioned in six documents between the late 10th century and 1036 under forms such as ager Savogensis, pagus Savogensis, or comitatus Savogensis. Its origins trace back to the 8th century, mentioned in the will of patrician Abbon (739) and in Charlemagne’s Divisio regnorum or Divisio imperii (806). In these documents, the broader Carolingian Saboia aligns with the smaller 11th-century pagus.

In 866, Lothair II of Lotharingia granted the cities of Chavord, Lémenc, and Aix to his wife Ermengarde, suggesting control by Emperor Louis. The ancient Savoie Propre comprised the mandements of Aix, Chambéry, Montmélian, and La Rochette. As a secondary territory, it was not organized as a county but as a deanery under the Bishopric of Grenoble in the neighboring Dauphiné. It later became part of the Kingdom of Provence in 855 and the Kingdom of Arles in 933.

=== State within the County of Savoy ===
In 1003, Humbert is mentioned as a count, though without specific reference to the County of Savoy, a title first recorded in 1143.

From the 13th to 14th centuries, Savoie Propre was one of the thirteen key bailliages of the Savoyard States, with Montmélian as its administrative center, described as the "key to the Alps" due to its strategic fortress controlling the Combe de Savoie, the gateway to Tarentaise and Maurienne, and a bridge over the Isère. In 1324, the County of Savoy was divided into eight bailliages, including Savoie Propre, which comprised 17 châtellenies out of a total of 77. Later, this was reduced to fourteen châtellenies.

The châtelain of Montmélian often served as the bailli of Savoie, acting as the count’s representative in financial, judicial, and military matters.

=== Province of the Duchy of Savoy (1723–1860) ===
In the 18th century, Victor Amadeus II of Savoy reorganized the Duchy of Savoy, establishing a general intendancy and five provincial intendancies. In 1723, the duchy was divided into six provinces and two bailliages, including Savoie Propre, Genevois, Faucigny, Chablais, Maurienne, Tarentaise, and the bailliages of Ternier and Gaillard. Savoie Propre comprised 204 parishes in 1723, expanding by ten parishes per the edict of 3 September 1749.

Following the entry of General Montesquiou on 22 September 1792, the province was incorporated into the French Republic under the decree of 27 November 1792, becoming part of the Mont-Blanc Department. The district of Chambéry was divided into 22 cantons, encompassing 183 communes.

By the law of 28 Pluviôse Year VIII (17 February 1800), the department was reorganized, with parts ceded to the Léman Department in 1798. Savoie Propre became the arrondissement of Chambéry, with 15 cantons and 175 communes. It reverted to Savoyard control in 1815, and by the edict of 16 December 1816, Victor Emmanuel restored nine provinces, including Savoie Propre, with 13 mandements and 142 communes.

Despite minor changes in 1818, 1835, and 1837, the provincial structure persisted until the Annexation of 1860, when Savoie Propre became part of the arrondissement of Chambéry in the Savoie Department, alongside Tarentaise and Maurienne.

=== Contemporary period ===
Today, Savoie Propre corresponds closely to the arrondissement of Chambéry within the Savoie Department in the Auvergne-Rhône-Alpes region of France. The region retains its historical significance, with Chambéry serving as the departmental prefecture and a cultural hub. Its economy is driven by tourism, agriculture, and small-scale industries, leveraging its Alpine landscapes and historical sites such as the Château de Chambéry.

== Administrative organization ==
This section outlines the administrative organization of Savoie Propre across different periods, including its time under the Duchy of Savoy, the French occupation (1792–1814), and post-1860 within France.

=== A Bailliage of the County of Savoy ===
In the latter half of the 13th century, the County of Savoy organized its châtellenies into bailliages. The bailliage of Savoie (Bailivia Sabaudie), sometimes called Savoie Propre, was centered at the Château de Montmélian. The baillis were typically also châtelains of Montmélian, though exceptions occurred. It included Savoie Propre, Tarentaise, and Maurienne.

In 1324, the bailliage comprised 17 châtellenies, including Chambéry, Le Bourget, Montfalcon, Cusy, Châtelard, Faverges, Entremont, Les Marches, Montmélian, Tournon, Ugine, Conflans, Tarentaise, Maurienne, Aiguebelle, La Rochette, and Les Mollettes. Later, this was reduced to fourteen châtellenies.

Baillis of Savoie from the 13th to 18th Centuries
- * 24 June 1264 – 24 June 1268: Jeoffrey/Soffred/Joffred/Geoffroy d'Ameysin (d'Amasino), bailli-châtelain
- * November 1269 – January 1272: Guillaume d'Ivens
- * January 1272 – January 1275: Albert de Bagnol, bailli-châtelain and receiver
- * January 1275 – January 1276: Pierre (de) Colombier, bailli-châtelain
- * May 1276 – March 1280: Pierre de Langes, bailli-châtelain
- * 30 November 1285 – April 1287: Guichard de Montagny, bailli-châtelain
- * March 1292 – May 1295: Guichard de Laya, bailli-châtelain
- * (1298?)/1301 – 1302: Hugues de Chandée, bailli-châtelain
- * 1302 – May 1305: Aymon de Varembon, bailli-châtelain
- * 1305 – 1306: Jacques de Quart, bailli-châtelain
- * (1306?)/1307 – March 1313: Guillaume de Châtillon, bailli-châtelain, and Humbert de Luyrieux, bailli-châtelain
- * c. 1316 – 1319/1323: Antoine de(s) Barge(s), knight and jurist
- * 1323 – 1327: Oddon/Odon de Chandieu/Chandyeu/de Chandée (Chandey)
- * March 1329 – July 1335/(1340?): Guy Provana (Provanis, Provane, Provains, Provayns), lord of Sainte-Hélène-du-Lac, bailli-châtelain
- * March 1340 – March 1341/(1342?): Jean de Saint-Amour, bailli-châtelain
- * December 1341 – November 1343: Girin de Saint-Symphorien, bailli-châtelain
- * May 1349 – September 1351: Pierre, coseigneur de Duin, bailli-châtelain
- * September 1351 – August 1352: Humbert (VI) de Villette, bailli-châtelain
- * February 1353 – April 1356: Hugues de Grandmont
- * May 1357 – March 1373: Humbert, dit le « Bâtard de Savoie », bailli-châtelain, lord of Arvillard
- * 1373/1374 – 1375: Humbert (II) dit d'Arvillard, son of Humbert, dit le « Bâtard de Savoie », bailli-châtelain
- * September 1375 – June 1385: François (de) Bouczan (Bausan, Bonzan), bailli-châtelain, bailli of Vaud (1375–1385)
- * June 1385 – January 1390: Aymon de Poypon (Pompon), bailli-châtelain
- * January 1391 – October 1392: Pierre/Perret Bouczan (Bausan, Bonezan, Bausani), bailli-châtelain
- * October 1392 – March 1398: Jacques de Villette, bailli-châtelain
- * 1398 – 1403/1404: Jean, bâtard de La Chambre, dit d'Aiguebelle, bailli-châtelain, châtelain of Tarentaise (1394–1415)
- * 1405 – 1449: Pierre Amblard de Chignin, damoiseau, knight, bailli-châtelain, châtelain of Maurienne (1417–1439)
- * 1456 – 1457: Jacques de Montbel, bailli-châtelain, also châtelain of Maurienne
- * (1457?)/1460 – 1463: Lancelot de Luyrieu(x)
- * 1 October 1463 – 1466 (?): Baron Antelme/Anthelme de Miolans, bailli-châtelain, future maréchal de Savoie (c. 1482–1485)
- * September 1471 – January 1477: Count François de Gruyère, bailli-châtelain, former maréchal de Savoie (1465–1468)
- * January 1493 – January 1496: Baron Jacques de Miolans, grand bailli-châtelain
- * February 1496 – January 1499: Hugues (Hugonin) de La Palu (Palud, Pallud), count of Varax, bailli-châtelain, maréchal de Savoie (c. 1492)
- * 1504 – 1531: Jean (IV) de La Ravoire]], lord, bailli-châtelain, former bailli of Montmayeur, ducal counselor and squire
- * ?: Antoine de Leschaux (L'Eschaulx), bailli-châtelain, later bailli of Aoste, captain of the château de Nice

From 1454, the bailli of Savoie, châtelain of Montmélian, was also titled captain of the Château de Montmélian.

=== Duchy of Savoy ===
==== 1723 to 1792 ====
Under Victor Amadeus II of Savoy, the Duchy of Savoy underwent significant administrative reforms. From 1723, Savoie Propre was one of six provinces, with Chambéry as its administrative center. The province was governed by an intendant who oversaw financial, judicial, and military affairs, supported by a network of local officials. The period saw economic development, including improvements in agriculture and infrastructure, such as roads connecting Chambéry to other provinces.

==== 1792 to 1814 ====
The French occupation of 1792 integrated Savoie Propre into the Mont-Blanc Department, with Chambéry as a district capital. The French administration introduced revolutionary reforms, including the abolition of feudal privileges and the establishment of cantons. In 1798, parts of Savoie Propre were ceded to the Léman Department. The region returned to Savoyard control in 1814 following the defeat of Napoleon.

==== 1816 to 1837 ====
In 1816, the Duchy of Savoy was reorganized, with Savoie Propre, centered in Chambéry, divided into thirteen mandements. A mandement was a territory encompassing communes and parishes under a châtellenie. Some mandements were adjusted in 1814:

1. Mandement de Chambéry
2. Mandement d'Aix
3. Mandement de Chamoux
4. Mandement du Châtelard
5. Mandement des Échelles
6. Mandement de Montmélian
7. Mandement de La Motte-Servolex
8. Mandement du Pont-de-Beauvoisin
9. Mandement de La Rochette
10. Mandement de Ruffieux
11. Mandement de Saint-Genix
12. Mandement de Saint-Pierre-d'Albigny
13. Mandement de Yenne

Each mandement was centered on a chief town (in italics) and comprised the following communes (as organized in 1814):

===== Mandement de Chambéry =====
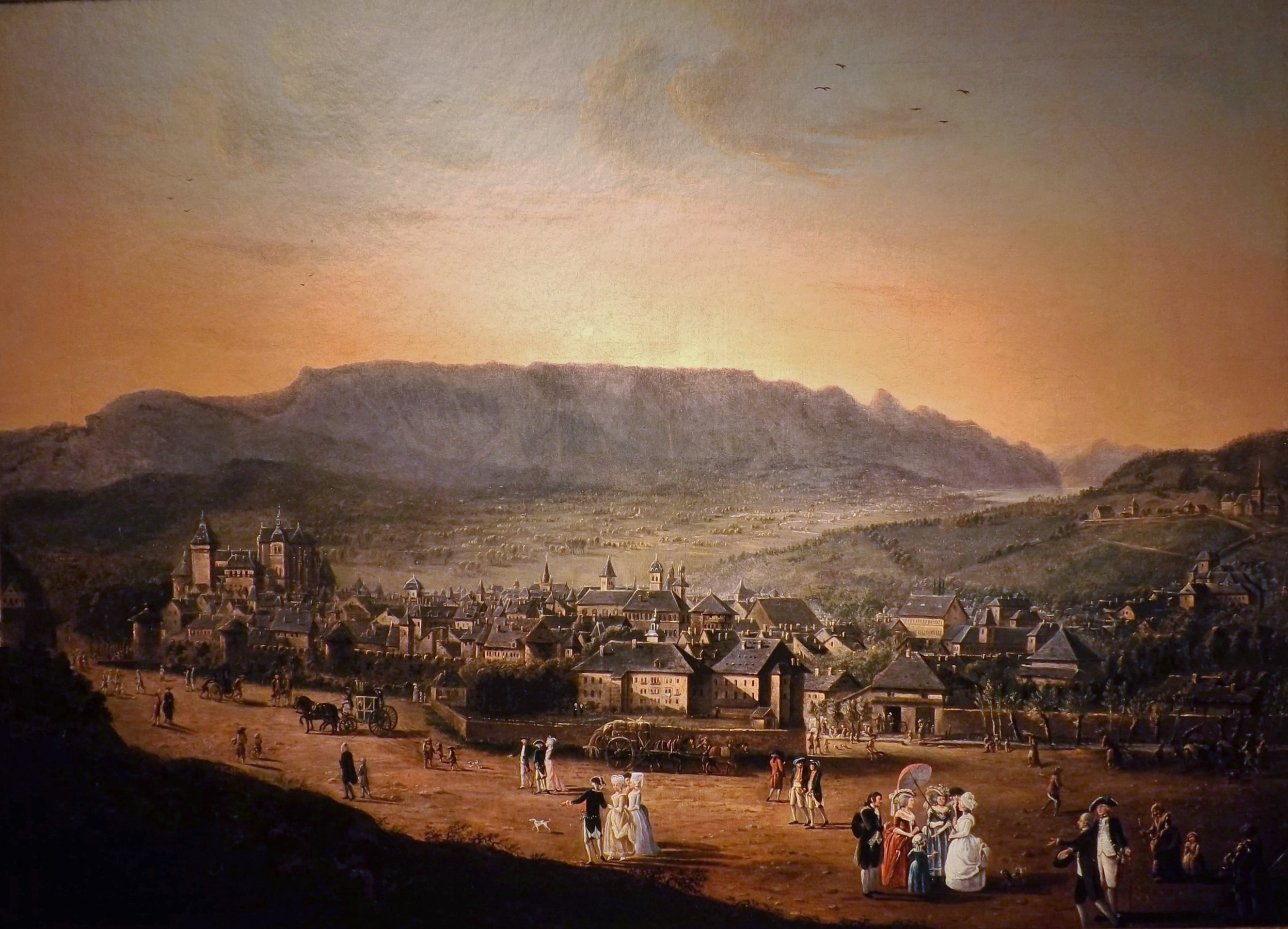
Chambéry around 1780.

Communes of the mandement:

1. Barberaz
2. Barby
3. Bassens
4. Chambéry
5. Curienne
6. Jacob-Bellecombette
7. La Ravoire
8. Les Déserts
9. Montagnole
10. Puygros
11. Saint-Alban
12. Saint-Baldoph
13. Saint-Cassin
14. Saint-Jean-d'Arvey
15. Saint-Jeoire en Savoie
16. Sonnaz
17. Thoiry
18. Triviers (Note: The commune of Triviers was renamed Challes-les-Eaux in 1872.)
19. Verel-Pragondran

===== Mandement d'Aix =====
Communes or parishes of the mandement:

1. Aix
2. Brison-Saint-Innocent
3. Drumettaz-Clarafond
4. Grésy-sur-Aix
5. Méry
6. Montcel
7. Mouxy
8. Pugny-Chatenod
9. Saint-Offenge-Dessous
10. Saint-Offenge-Dessus
11. Tresserve
12. Trévignin
13. Viviers
14. Voglans

===== Mandement de Chamoux =====
Communes or parishes of the mandement:

1. Betton-Bettonet
2. Bourget-en-Huile
3. Chamoux
4. Champ-Laurent
5. Châteauneuf
6. Coise-Saint-Jean-Pied-Gauthier
7. Hauteville
8. Le Pontet
9. Montendry
10. Villard-Léger

===== Mandement du Châtelard =====
Communes or parishes of the mandement:

1. Aillon
2. Arith
3. Bellecombe
4. Doucy (Note: The commune of Doucy merged with La Léchère in 1972.)
5. École
6. Jarsy
7. La Compôte
8. La Motte-en-Bauges
9. Le Châtelard
10. Le Noyer
11. Lescheraines
12. Sainte-Reine
13. Saint-François-de-Sales

===== Mandement des Échelles =====
Communes or parishes of the mandement:

1. Attignat-Oncin
2. Corbel
3. Entremont-le-Vieux
4. La Bauche
5. Les Échelles
6. Saint-Christophe
7. Saint-Franc
8. Saint-Jean-de-Couz
9. Saint-Pierre-d'Entremont
10. Saint-Pierre-de-Genebroz
11. Saint-Thibaud-de-Couz

===== Mandement de Montmélian =====
Communes or parishes of the mandement:

1. Apremont
2. Arbin
3. Chignin
4. Francin
5. La Chavanne
6. Laissaud
7. Les Marches
8. Les Mollettes
9. Montmélian
10. Planaise
11. Sainte-Hélène-du-Lac
12. Saint-Pierre-de-Soucy
13. Villard-d'Héry
14. Villaroux

===== Mandement de La Motte-Servolex =====
Communes or parishes of the mandement:

1. Bissy
2. Bourdeau
3. Le Bourget-du-Lac
4. La Chapelle-du-Mont-du-Chat
5. Chambéry-le-Vieux
6. Cognin
7. La Motte-Servolex
8. Saint-Sulpice
9. Vimines

===== Mandement du Pont-de-Beauvoisin =====
Communes or parishes of the mandement:

1. Aiguebelette
2. Ayn
3. Belmont-Tramonet
4. Domessin
5. Dullin
6. La Bridoire
7. Lépin
8. Nances
9. La Motte-Servolex
10. Saint-Alban-de-Montbel
11. Saint-Béron
12. Verel-de-Montbel

===== Mandement de La Rochette =====
Communes or parishes of the mandement:

1. Arvillard
2. La Chapelle-Blanche
3. La Croix-de-la-Rochette
4. Détrier
5. Étable
6. Presle
7. La Rochette
8. Rotherens
9. La Table
10. La Trinité
11. Le Verneil
12. Villard-Sallet

===== Mandement de Ruffieux =====
Communes or parishes of the mandement:

1. Chanaz
2. Chindrieux
3. Conjux
4. Motz
5. Ruffieux
6. Saint-Pierre-de-Curtille
7. Serrières
8. Vions

===== Mandement de Saint-Genix =====
Communes or parishes of the mandement:

1. Avressieux
2. Champagneux
3. Gerbaix
4. Gressin-Lepin-et-Molasses
5. Marcieux
6. Novalaise
7. Rochefort
8. Saint-Genix
9. Sainte-Marie-d'Alvey
10. Saint-Maurice-de-Rotherens

===== Mandement de Saint-Pierre-d'Albigny =====
Communes or parishes of the mandement:

1. Cruet
2. Fréterive
3. La Thuile
4. Saint-Jean-de-la-Porte
5. Saint-Pierre-d'Albigny

===== Mandement de Yenne =====
Communes or parishes of the mandement:

1. Billième
2. Jongieux
3. La Balme
4. La Chapelle-Saint-Martin
5. Loisieux
6. Lucey
7. Mérieux-Trévouet
8. Ontex
9. Saint-Jean-de-Chevelu
10. Saint-Paul en Savoie Propre
11. Saint-Pierre-d'Alvey
12. Traize
13. Verthemex
14. Yenne

==== 1838 to 1860 ====
By letters patent of 2 September 1837, effective 1 January 1838, King Charles Albert detached the mandement of Chamoux from Savoie Propre to join Maurienne and incorporated the mandement of Albens from Genevois into Savoie Propre.

=== Department of Savoie (1860 to Present) ===
Following the Annexation of 1860, Savoie Propre was integrated into the Savoie Department as the arrondissement of Chambéry. The arrondissement today includes 22 cantons and 147 communes, with Chambéry as the prefecture. The region is part of the Auvergne-Rhône-Alpes administrative region, established in 2016, and continues to play a central role in the cultural and economic life of Savoie.

== Heraldry ==
Savoie Propre
- Coat of arms of Savoie Propre

== See also ==
- History of Savoy
- Duchy of Savoy
- County of Savoy
- Chambéry
- Arrondissement of Chambéry
- Tarentaise Valley
- Maurienne

== Bibliography ==
- Abry, Christian; Cuisenier, Jean; Devos, Roger; Raulin, Henri (1979). Les sources régionales de la Savoie. Une approche ethnologique, alimentation, habitat, élevage [Regional Sources of Savoie: An Ethnological Approach, Food, Housing, Livestock] (in French). Paris: Fayard. ISBN 978-2-213-00787-8.
- Demotz, Bernard (2000). Le comté de Savoie du XIe au XVe siècle [The County of Savoy from the 11th to the 15th Century] (in French). Geneva: Slatkine. ISBN 2-05-101676-3.
- Dessaix, Joseph; Melin, Gérard (1994) [1854]. La Savoie historique, pittoresque, statistique et biographique [Historical, Picturesque, Statistical, and Biographical Savoie] (in French). Paris and Geneva: Slatkine. ISBN 2-05-101334-9.
- Ménabréa, Léon (1847). Histoire municipale et politique de Chambéry [Municipal and Political History of Chambéry] (in French). Chambéry: Perrin fils.
- Ménabréa, Léon (1841). Les Alpes historiques. Première étude Montmélian et les Alpes, étude historique accompagnée de documents inédits [The Historical Alps. First Study: Montmélian and the Alps, a Historical Study with Unpublished Documents] (in French). Chambéry: Puthod.
- Victor-Emmanuel Ier de Sardaigne; Bianco, Vincent (1819). Recueil des édits, lettres-patentes, manifestes et ordonnances : publiés dans le duché de Savoie dès le 10 septembre 1814 où sont insérés les règlemens (sic), instructions et circulaires concernant le service du roi et l'administration de la justice [Collection of Edicts, Letters Patent, Manifestos, and Ordinances: Published in the Duchy of Savoy from 10 September 1814, Including Regulations, Instructions, and Circulars Concerning the King's Service and the Administration of Justice] (in French). Vol. 7. Chambéry: Vincent Bianco.
- Vernier, Jules-Joseph (1993). Département de la Savoie: étude historique et géographique [Department of Savoie: historical and geographical study] (in French). Res Universis. ISBN 978-2-7428-0039-1.
