= Villard =

Villard may refer to:

== People ==
- Villard (surname)

== Places ==
=== France ===
- Villard, Creuse
- Villard, Haute-Savoie
- Villard-Bonnot, in the Isère department
- Villard-de-Lans, in the Isère department
- Villard-d'Héry, in the Savoie department
- Villard-Léger, in the Savoie department
- Villard-Notre-Dame, in the Isère department
- Villard-Reculas, in the Isère department
- Villard-Reymond, in the Isère department
- Villard-Saint-Christophe, in the Isère department
- Villard-Saint-Sauveur, in the Jura department
- Villard-Sallet, in the Savoie department
- Villard-sur-Bienne, in the Jura department
- Villard-sur-Doron, in the Savoie department

=== United States ===
- Villard, Minnesota
- Villard Township, Todd County, Minnesota
- Villard Township, McHenry County, North Dakota, former county seat of McHenry County, North Dakota
- Villard Hall, a building on the University of Oregon campus

== Other uses ==
- Villard grapes, French wine hybrid grapes including the Villard noir and the Villard blanc
- Villard (imprint), an imprint of Random House
- Villard (automaker), an interwar French manufacturer of cyclecars
