= Arbin =

Arbin may refer to:

- Arbin, Syria, a town in the Rif Dimashq Governorate in southern Syria
- Arbin, Savoie, a commune in the Savoie department in the Rhône-Alpes region in south-eastern France.
