= Le Pontet =

Le Pontet is the name of the following communes in France:

- Le Pontet, Savoie, in the Savoie department
- Le Pontet, Vaucluse, in the Vaucluse department
