= Arrondissement of Chambéry =

Coordinates: 45°34′N 5°55′E

Chambéry
- Arrondissement
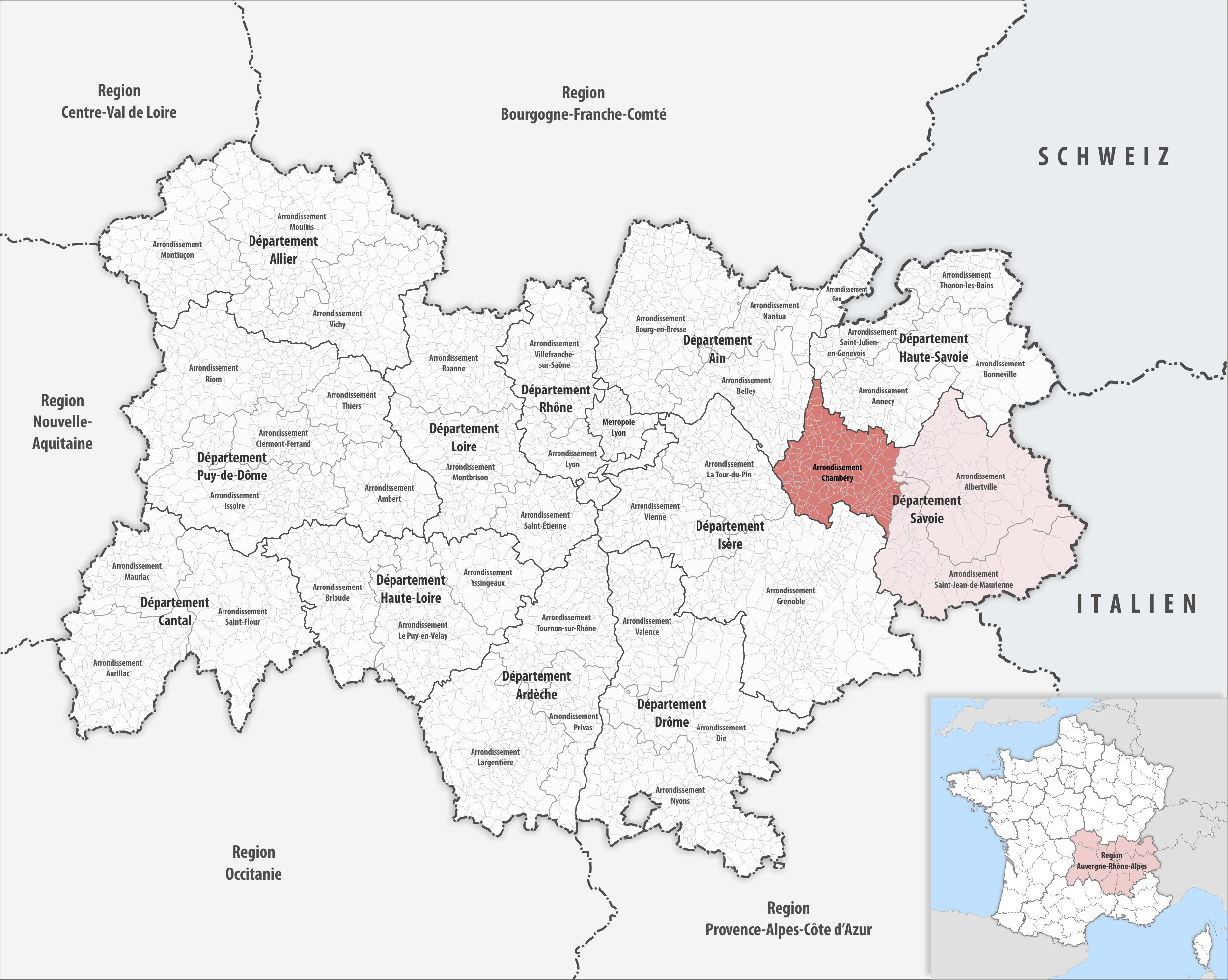
- Location within the region Auvergne-Rhône-Alpes
- Country: France
- Region: Auvergne-Rhône-Alpes
- Department: Savoie
- No. of communes: {{{nbcomm}}}
- Area: 1,586.1 km^{2} (612.4 sq mi)
- Population (2023): 292,832
  - Density: 184.62/km^{2} (478.17/sq mi)
- INSEE code: 732

The arrondissement of Chambéry is an arrondissement of France in the Savoie department in the Auvergne-Rhône-Alpes region. It has 151 communes. Its population is 287,551 (2021), and its area is 1,586.1 km^{2} (612.4 sq mi).

== Composition ==
The communes of the arrondissement of Chambéry, and their INSEE codes, are:

1. Aiguebelette-le-Lac (73001)
2. Aillon-le-Jeune (73004)
3. Aillon-le-Vieux (73005)
4. Aix-les-Bains (73008)
5. Apremont (73017)
6. Arbin (73018)
7. Arith (73020)
8. Arvillard (73021)
9. Attignat-Oncin (73022)
10. Avressieux (73025)
11. Ayn (73027)
12. La Balme (73028)
13. Barberaz (73029)
14. Barby (73030)
15. Bassens (73031)
16. La Bauche (73033)
17. Bellecombe-en-Bauges (73036)
18. Belmont-Tramonet (73039)
19. Betton-Bettonet (73041)
20. Billième (73042)
21. La Biolle (73043)
22. Bourdeau (73050)
23. Le Bourget-du-Lac (73051)
24. Bourget-en-Huile (73052)
25. Bourgneuf (73053)
26. La Bridoire (73058)
27. Brison-Saint-Innocent (73059)
28. Challes-les-Eaux (73064)
29. Chambéry (73065)
30. Chamousset (73068)
31. Chamoux-sur-Gelon (73069)
32. Champ-Laurent (73072)
33. Champagneux (73070)
34. Chanaz (73073)
35. La Chapelle-Blanche (73075)
36. La Chapelle-Saint-Martin (73078)
37. La Chapelle-du-Mont-du-Chat (73076)
38. Châteauneuf (73079)
39. Le Châtelard (73081)
40. La Chavanne (73082)
41. Chignin (73084)
42. Chindrieux (73085)
43. Cognin (73087)
44. Coise-Saint-Jean-Pied-Gauthier (73089)
45. La Compôte (73090)
46. Conjux (73091)
47. Corbel (73092)
48. La Croix-de-la-Rochette (73095)
49. Cruet (73096)
50. Curienne (73097)
51. Les Déserts (73098)
52. Détrier (73099)
53. Domessin (73100)
54. Doucy-en-Bauges (73101)
55. Drumettaz-Clarafond (73103)
56. Dullin (73104)
57. Les Échelles (73105)
58. École (73106)
59. Entrelacs (73010)
60. Entremont-le-Vieux (73107)
61. Fréterive (73120)
62. Gerbaix (73122)
63. Grésy-sur-Aix (73128)
64. Hauteville (73133)
65. Jacob-Bellecombette (73137)
66. Jarsy (73139)
67. Jongieux (73140)
68. Laissaud (73141)
69. Lépin-le-Lac (73145)
70. Lescheraines (73146)
71. Loisieux (73147)
72. Lucey (73149)
73. Marcieux (73152)
74. Méry (73155)
75. Meyrieux-Trouet (73156)
76. Les Mollettes (73159)
77. Montagnole (73160)
78. Montcel (73164)
79. Montendry (73166)
80. Montmélian (73171)
81. La Motte-en-Bauges (73178)
82. La Motte-Servolex (73179)
83. Motz (73180)
84. Mouxy (73182)
85. Myans (73183)
86. Nances (73184)
87. Novalaise (73191)
88. Le Noyer (73192)
89. Ontex (73193)
90. Planaise (73200)
91. Le Pont-de-Beauvoisin (73204)
92. Le Pontet (73205)
93. Porte-de-Savoie (73151)
94. Presle (73207)
95. Pugny-Chatenod (73208)
96. Puygros (73210)
97. La Ravoire (73213)
98. Rochefort (73214)
99. Rotherens (73217)
100. Ruffieux (73218)
101. Saint-Alban-Leysse (73222)
102. Saint-Alban-de-Montbel (73219)
103. Saint-Baldoph (73225)
104. Saint-Béron (73226)
105. Saint-Cassin (73228)
106. Saint-Christophe (73229)
107. Sainte-Hélène-du-Lac (73240)
108. Sainte-Marie-d'Alvey (73254)
109. Sainte-Reine (73277)
110. Saint-Franc (73233)
111. Saint-François-de-Sales (73234)
112. Saint-Genix-les-Villages (73236)
113. Saint-Jean-d'Arvey (73243)
114. Saint-Jean-de-Chevelu (73245)
115. Saint-Jean-de-Couz (73246)
116. Saint-Jean-de-la-Porte (73247)
117. Saint-Jeoire-Prieuré (73249)
118. Saint-Offenge (73263)
119. Saint-Ours (73265)
120. Saint-Paul (73269)
121. Saint-Pierre-d'Albigny (73270)
122. Saint-Pierre-d'Alvey (73271)
123. Saint-Pierre-d'Entremont (73274)
124. Saint-Pierre-de-Curtille (73273)
125. Saint-Pierre-de-Genebroz (73275)
126. Saint-Pierre-de-Soucy (73276)
127. Saint-Sulpice (73281)
128. Saint-Thibaud-de-Couz (73282)
129. Serrières-en-Chautagne (73286)
130. Sonnaz (73288)
131. La Table (73289)
132. Thoiry (73293)
133. La Thuile (73294)
134. Traize (73299)
135. Tresserve (73300)
136. Trévignin (73301)
137. La Trinité (73302)
138. Valgelon-La Rochette (73215)
139. Verel-de-Montbel (73309)
140. Verel-Pragondran (73310)
141. Le Verneil (73311)
142. Verthemex (73313)
143. Villard-d'Héry (73314)
144. Villard-Léger (73315)
145. Villard-Sallet (73316)
146. Villaroux (73324)
147. Vimines (73326)
148. Vions (73327)
149. Viviers-du-Lac (73328)
150. Voglans (73329)
151. Yenne (73330)

== History ==
The arrondissement of Chambéry was created in 1860.

As a result of the reorganisation of the cantons of France which came into effect in 2015, the borders of the cantons are no longer related to the borders of the arrondissements. The cantons of the arrondissement of Chambéry were, as of January 2015:

1. Aix-les-Bains-Centre
2. Aix-les-Bains-Nord-Grésy
3. Aix-les-Bains-Sud
4. Albens
5. Chambéry-Est
6. Chambéry-Nord
7. Chambéry-Sud
8. Chambéry-Sud-Ouest
9. Chamoux-sur-Gelon
10. Le Châtelard
11. Cognin
12. Les Échelles
13. Montmélian
14. La Motte-Servolex
15. Le Pont-de-Beauvoisin
16. La Ravoire
17. La Rochette
18. Ruffieux
19. Saint-Alban-Leysse
20. Saint-Genix-sur-Guiers
21. Saint-Pierre-d'Albigny
22. Yenne
