= Amélie Gex =

Savoyard writer and poet

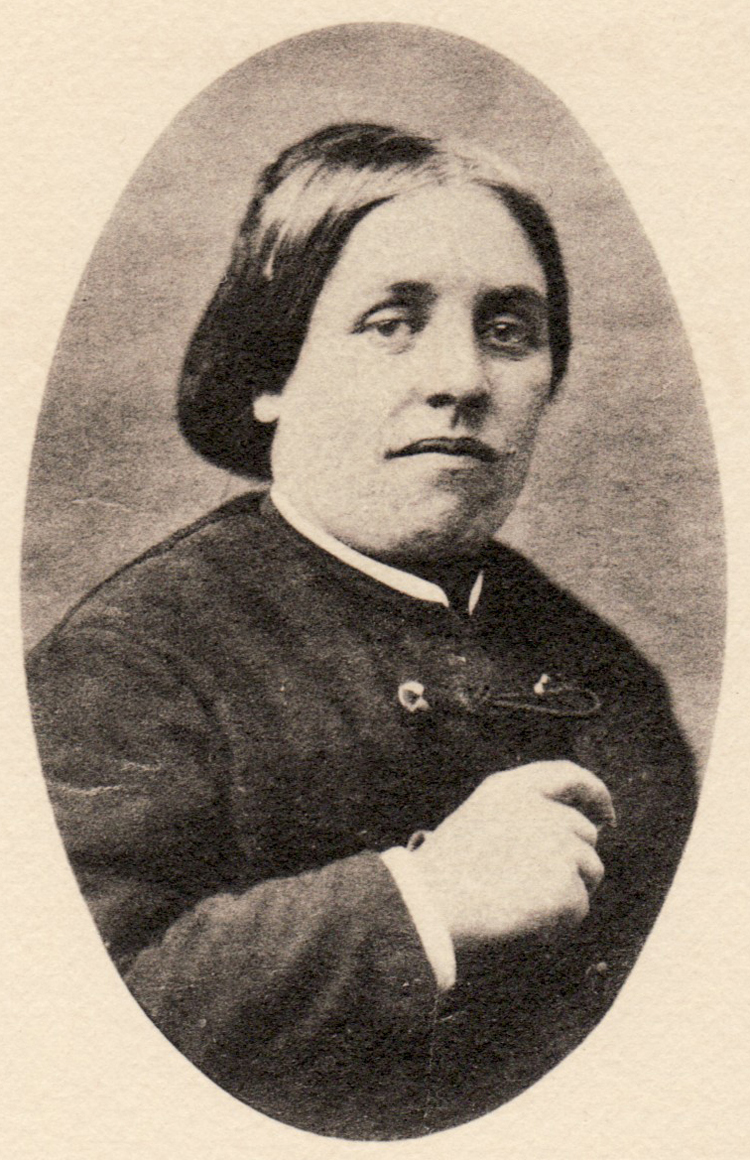
Amélie Gex, ca. 1875

Amélie Rose Françoise Gex (October 24, 1835 in La Chapelle-Blanche, Savoie – June 16, 1883 in Chambéry) was a Savoyard writer and poet who created works in French and Franco-Provençal (Arpitan). Until 1880, she published most of her writings under the pen name Dian de la Jeânna.

== Biography ==
Amélie Gex was the daughter of the medical doctor and winemaker Marc-Samuel Gex. Her mother died when she was 4 years old. She first lived in Chambéry then Challes-les-Eaux with her grandmother. At fourteen, she moved back to La Chapelle-Blanche with her father.

Upon the formation of the Kingdom of Italy in 1861, Gex, like many Liberals who preferred the Italian Cavour to Napoleon III of France, supported King Victor Emmanuel II. She later became Republican, and entered politics, writing speeches in dialect to better speak to rural voters.

Gex began writing during the years 1872–75. After the death of her father in 1876, she operated her family's estate, then returned to live in Chambéry, where she lived modestly.

In 1877, the Republican newspaper Le Père André began publishing her poetry under the pen name Dian de la Jeânna ("John son of Jane"). She continued publishing under this name in Le Père André from March 1879 until May 1880, then in L'Indicateur savoisien from 1879 to 1882. Her poems are devoted to vineyards, farmers and the Savoy. They evoke the harvest, threshing with a flail, and the cycles of nature that motivate people to work.

Gex also wrote short stories. In "Dit de la couleuvre" ("Tale of the Snake"), she reworks the story of the Queen of Sheba, who rode a flying serpent to marry Solomon. In "Dit du Château mort" ("Tale of Castle Death"), she evokes a pagan country castle near Mont Blanc haunted by a flaming sword turning in the air. Deciding that politics should give way to work, she also strove to write stories in French to expand her readership.

In 1882, she was honored by the Academy of Savoy for her work.

She died of an illness in 1883.

== Selected works ==
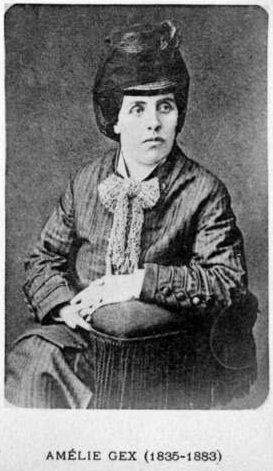
Amélie Gex

- 1878, Le long de l'An, chansons en patois savoyard, avec la traduction française en regard, Imp. C.-P. Ménard, Chambéry
- 1879, Reclans de Savoué, Les Echos de Savoie, Imp. C.-P. Ménard, Chambéry
- 1880, Poésies, Imp. C.-P. Ménard, Chambéry
- 1882, Lo cent ditons de Pierre d'Emo, Imp. C.-P. Ménard, Chambéry
- 1882, À une âme sincère, Imp. C.-P. Ménard, Chambéry
- 1885, Vieilles gens et vieilles choses : Histoire de ma rue de mon village, quatre contes
- 1894, Feuilles mortes, Imp. C.-P. Ménard, Chambéry
- 1898, Fables, Imp. C.-P. Ménard, Chambéry

== Bibliography ==
- Charles Buet (1889), Le Parnasse contemporain savoyard, Thonon: Charles Buet & Impremerie de la Société Anonyme de l'Union Chablaisienne. (in French)
- Jolanda (1909), Il bardo della Savoia (Amélie Gex), Lugano: Casa editrice del « Coenobium ». (in Italian)
- F. Vermale (1923), Un Poète Savoyard, Amélie Gex (1835-1883). Notes biographiques et correspondance, Chambéry: Librairie Dardel, Chambéry. (in French)
- David Oscar (1926), Amélie Gex, Éditions revues du Lac d'Annecy. (in French)
- Augusta Abry (1942), Notre patois et nos poètes patoisants, Rumilly: Éd. J. Ducret (in French)
- Amis d'Amélie Gex (1955), Vieilles gens et vieilles choses : histoires de ma rue et de mon village. Amélie Gex, préf. Henry Bordeaux, Paris: Éd. Jean Portail (in French)
- Amélie Gex, trad. Armanda Grazini (1989), Vecchia gente e vecchie cose : storie della mia strada e del mio villaggio, Siena: Siena - universita. (in Italian)
- Philippe Terreaux (1990), La Savoie jadis et naguère : d'Amélie Gex à Henry Bordeaux, Geneva: Éditions Slatkine, 201 pages. (in French)
- Valentina Gosetti (2023), 'Under Ideal Conditions: Provincializing the 'French' Poetic Canon with Amélie Gex (1835–1883)', French Studies Bulletin, Volume 44, Issue 167-168, Autumn 2023, Pages 48–62.
