= Canton of Montmélian =

Coordinates: 45°29′40″N 6°03′03″E

Montmélian
- Canton
- Interactive map of Montmélian
- Country: France
- Region: Auvergne-Rhône-Alpes
- Department: Savoie
- No. of communes: {{{nbcomm}}}

Government
  - Representatives (2021–2028): Jean-François Duc and Béatrice Santais
- Area: 207.99 km^{2} (80.31 sq mi)
- Population (2023): 25,506
  - Density: 122.63/km^{2} (317.61/sq mi)
- INSEE code: 7311

The Canton of Montmélian is a canton located within the Savoie department of France.

Elected to represent the canton in the General Council of Savoie:

- Jean-François Duc and Jacqueline Tallin (2015-2021)

== Composition ==
Since the French canton reorganisation which came into effect in March 2015, the communes of the canton of Montmélian are:

- Apremont
- Arbin
- Arvillard
- Bourget-en-Huile
- La Chapelle-Blanche
- La Chavanne
- Chignin
- La Croix-de-la-Rochette
- Détrier
- Laissaud
- Les Mollettes
- Montmélian
- Myans
- Planaise
- Le Pontet
- Porte-de-Savoie
- Presle
- Rotherens
- Sainte-Hélène-du-Lac
- Saint-Pierre-de-Soucy
- La Table
- La Trinité
- Valgelon-La Rochette
- Le Verneil
- Villard-Sallet
- Villard-d'Héry
- Villaroux

== See also ==
- Arrondissement of Chambéry
- Cantons of the Savoie department
- Communes of the Savoie department
