= Presle =

Presle Préle (Savoyard)
- Commune
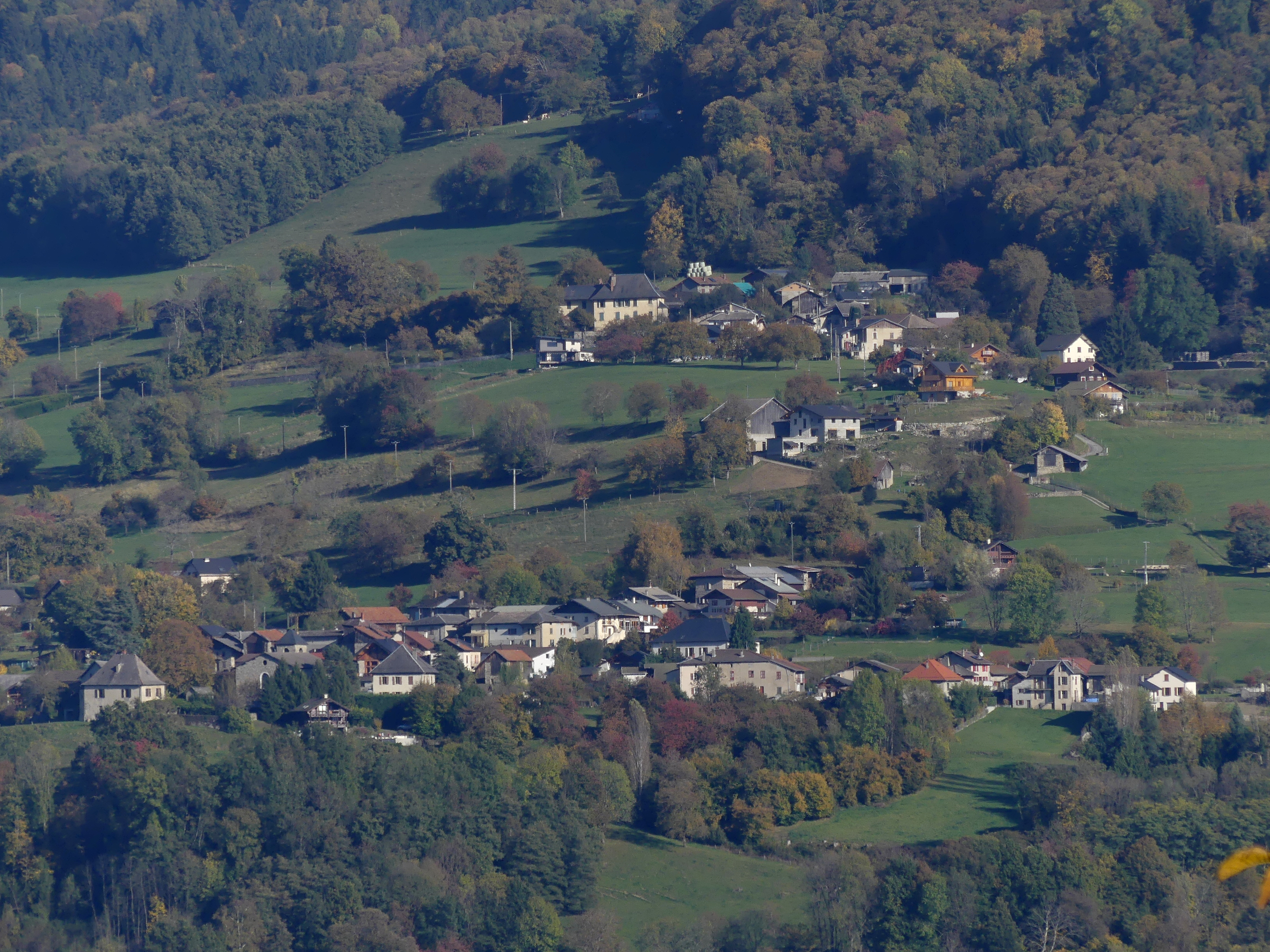
- View of Presle from La Chapelle-Blanche
- Location of Presle
- Location within France Location within Auvergne-Rhône-Alpes
- Coordinates: 45°27′19″N 6°08′20″E
- Country: France
- Region: Auvergne-Rhône-Alpes
- Department: Savoie
- Arrondissement: Chambéry
- Canton: Montmélian

Government
  - Mayor (2020–2026): Jean-Yves Berger-Sabattel
- Area^{1}: 11.58 km^{2} (4.47 sq mi)
- Highest elevation: 2,335 m (7,661 ft)
- Lowest elevation: 360 m (1,180 ft)
- Population (2023): 424
  - Density: 36.6/km^{2} (94.8/sq mi)
- Time zone: UTC+01:00 (CET)
  - Summer (DST): UTC+02:00 (CEST)
- INSEE/Postal code: 73207 /73110
- ^{1} French Land Register data, which excludes lakes, ponds, glaciers > 1 km^{2} (0.386 sq mi or 247 acres) and river estuaries.

Presle (French pronunciation: [pʁɛl]; Savoyard: Préle) is a commune in the Savoie department, Auvergne-Rhône-Alpes, southeastern France.

== See also ==
- Communes of the Savoie department
