= Myans =

Myans Myan (Savoyard)
- Commune
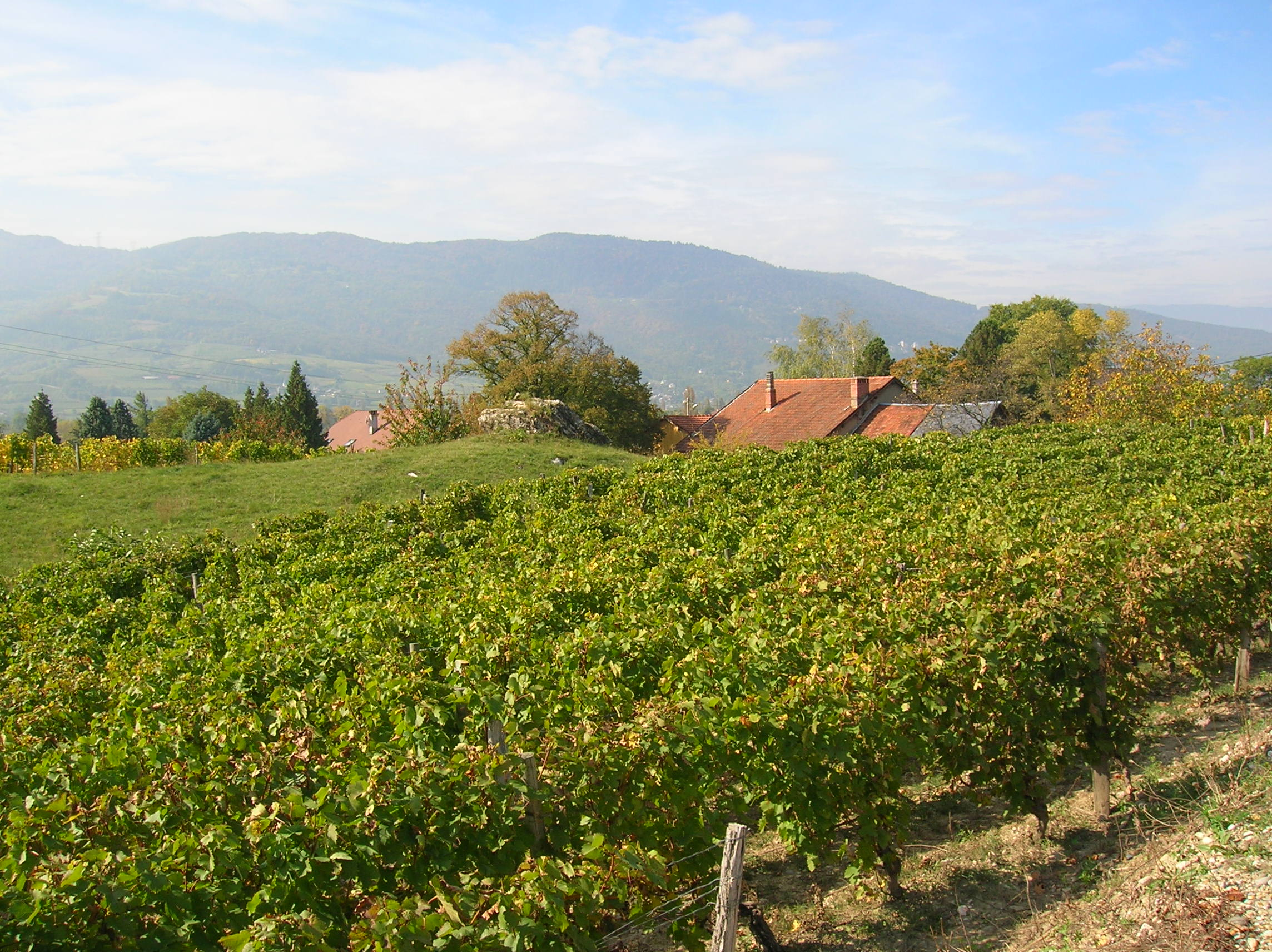
- Location of Myans
- Location within France Location within Auvergne-Rhône-Alpes
- Coordinates: 45°30′55″N 5°59′13″E
- Country: France
- Region: Auvergne-Rhône-Alpes
- Department: Savoie
- Arrondissement: Chambéry
- Canton: Montmélian

Government
  - Mayor (2020–2026): Jean-Pierre Guillaud
- Area^{1}: 3.58 km^{2} (1.38 sq mi)
- Highest elevation: 347 m (1,138 ft)
- Lowest elevation: 290 m (950 ft)
- Population (2023): 1,318
  - Density: 368/km^{2} (954/sq mi)
- Time zone: UTC+01:00 (CET)
  - Summer (DST): UTC+02:00 (CEST)
- INSEE/Postal code: 73183 /73800
- ^{1} French Land Register data, which excludes lakes, ponds, glaciers > 1 km^{2} (0.386 sq mi or 247 acres) and river estuaries.

Myans (French pronunciation: [mjɑ̃]; Savoyard: Myan) is a commune in the Savoie department in the Auvergne-Rhône-Alpes region in south-eastern France.

== See also ==
- Communes of the Savoie department
