= Le Verneil =

Le Verneil Le Varné (Savoyard)
- Commune
- Location of Le Verneil
- Location within France Location within Auvergne-Rhône-Alpes
- Coordinates: 45°27′50″N 6°10′03″E
- Country: France
- Region: Auvergne-Rhône-Alpes
- Department: Savoie
- Arrondissement: Chambéry
- Canton: Montmélian

Government
  - Mayor (2020–2026): Sébastien Martinet
- Area^{1}: 7.52 km^{2} (2.90 sq mi)
- Highest elevation: 2,076 m (6,811 ft)
- Lowest elevation: 555 m (1,821 ft)
- Population (2023): 88
  - Density: 12/km^{2} (30/sq mi)
- Time zone: UTC+01:00 (CET)
  - Summer (DST): UTC+02:00 (CEST)
- INSEE/Postal code: 73311 /73110
- ^{1} French Land Register data, which excludes lakes, ponds, glaciers > 1 km^{2} (0.386 sq mi or 247 acres) and river estuaries.

Le Verneil (French pronunciation: [lə vɛʁnɛj]; Savoyard: Le Varné) is a commune in the Savoie department in the Auvergne-Rhône-Alpes region in south-eastern France.

== See also ==
- Communes of the Savoie department
