= La Croix-de-la-Rochette =

- Commune
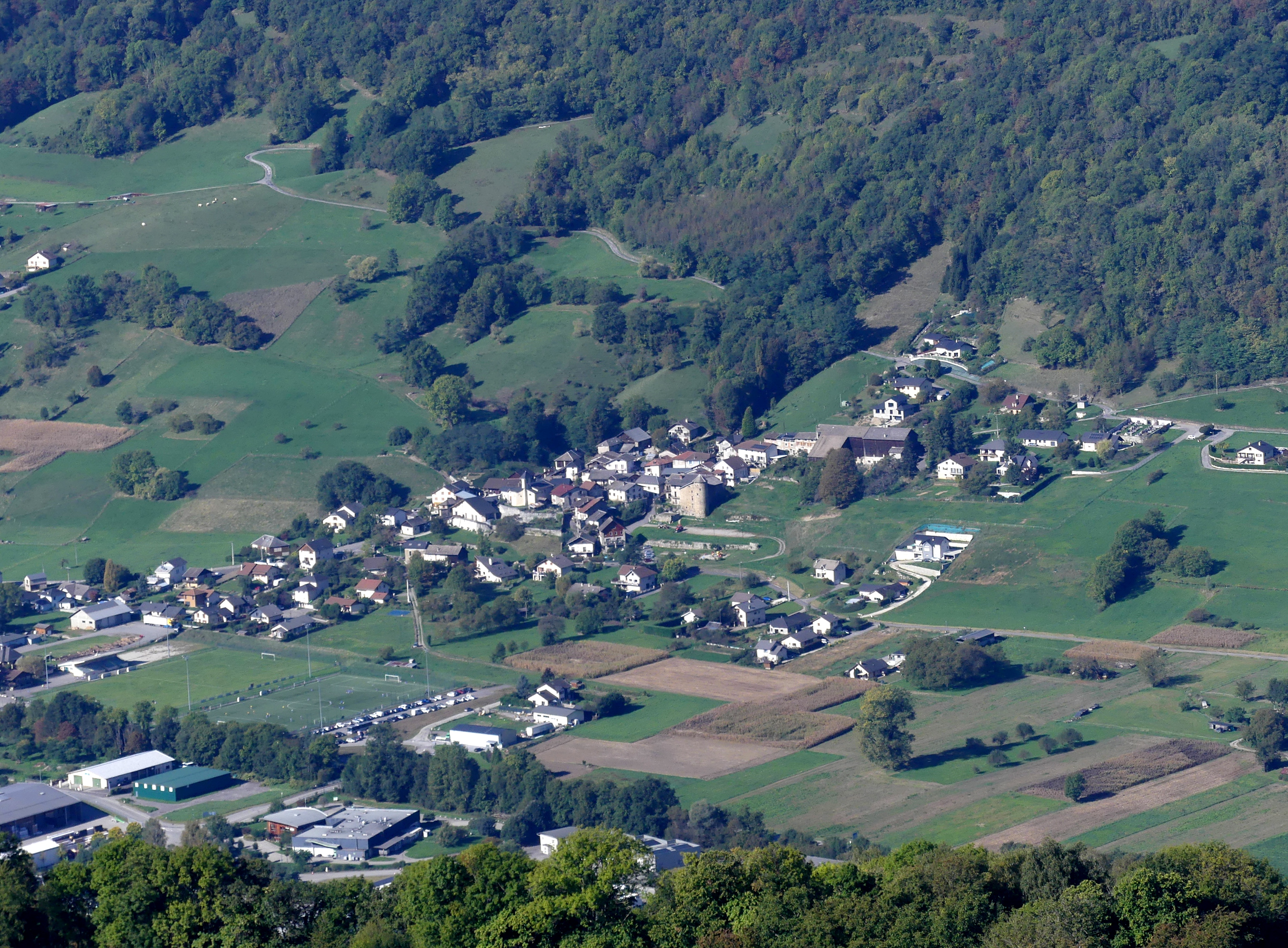
- Location of La Croix-de-la-Rochette
- Location within France Location within Auvergne-Rhône-Alpes
- Coordinates: 45°28′04″N 6°07′11″E
- Country: France
- Region: Auvergne-Rhône-Alpes
- Department: Savoie
- Arrondissement: Chambéry
- Canton: Montmélian

Government
  - Mayor (2020–2026): Ludovic Lambert
- Area^{1}: 3.04 km^{2} (1.17 sq mi)
- Highest elevation: 811 m (2,661 ft)
- Lowest elevation: 313 m (1,027 ft)
- Population (2023): 380
  - Density: 120/km^{2} (320/sq mi)
- Time zone: UTC+01:00 (CET)
  - Summer (DST): UTC+02:00 (CEST)
- INSEE/Postal code: 73095 /73110
- ^{1} French Land Register data, which excludes lakes, ponds, glaciers > 1 km^{2} (0.386 sq mi or 247 acres) and river estuaries.

La Croix-de-la-Rochette (French pronunciation: [la kʁwa də la ʁɔʃɛt]) is a commune in the Savoie department in the Auvergne-Rhône-Alpes region in south-eastern France.

== See also ==
- Communes of the Savoie department
