= La Table =

- Commune
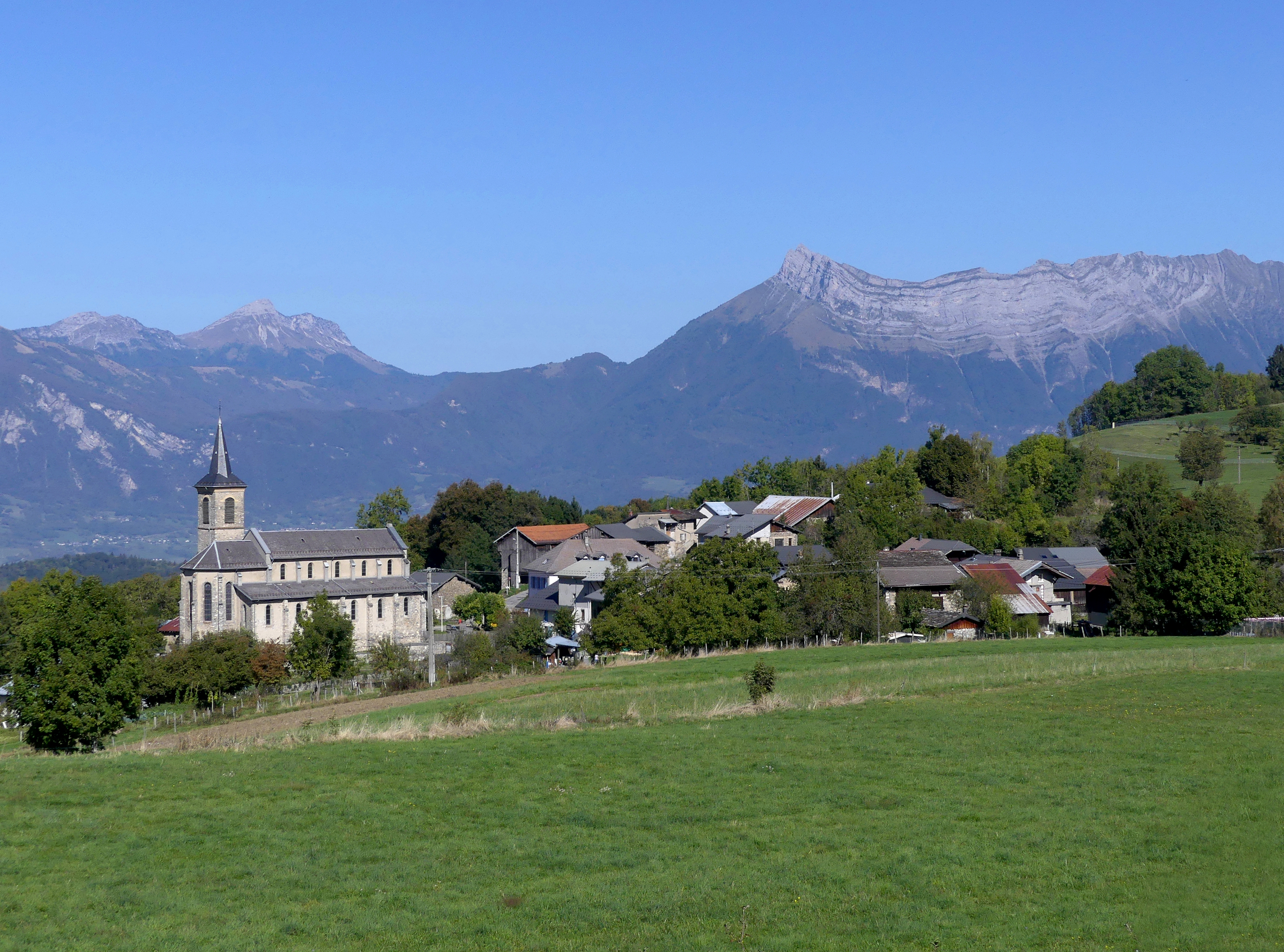

- Coat of arms
- Location of La Table
- Location within France Location within Auvergne-Rhône-Alpes
- Coordinates: 45°28′51″N 6°10′21″E
- Country: France
- Region: Auvergne-Rhône-Alpes
- Department: Savoie
- Arrondissement: Chambéry
- Canton: Montmélian

Government
  - Mayor (2020–2026): Jean-François Claraz
- Area^{1}: 14.85 km^{2} (5.73 sq mi)
- Highest elevation: 1,992 m (6,535 ft)
- Lowest elevation: 305 m (1,001 ft)
- Population (2023): 445
  - Density: 30.0/km^{2} (77.6/sq mi)
- Time zone: UTC+01:00 (CET)
  - Summer (DST): UTC+02:00 (CEST)
- INSEE/Postal code: 73289 /73110
- ^{1} French Land Register data, which excludes lakes, ponds, glaciers > 1 km^{2} (0.386 sq mi or 247 acres) and river estuaries.

La Table (French pronunciation: [la tabl]; Arpitan: La Tâbla) is a commune in the Savoie department in the Auvergne-Rhône-Alpes region in south-eastern France.

== See also ==
- Communes of the Savoie department
