= Canton of Chambéry-Sud =

Coordinates: 45.560°N 5.926°E

Chambéry-Sud
- Former canton
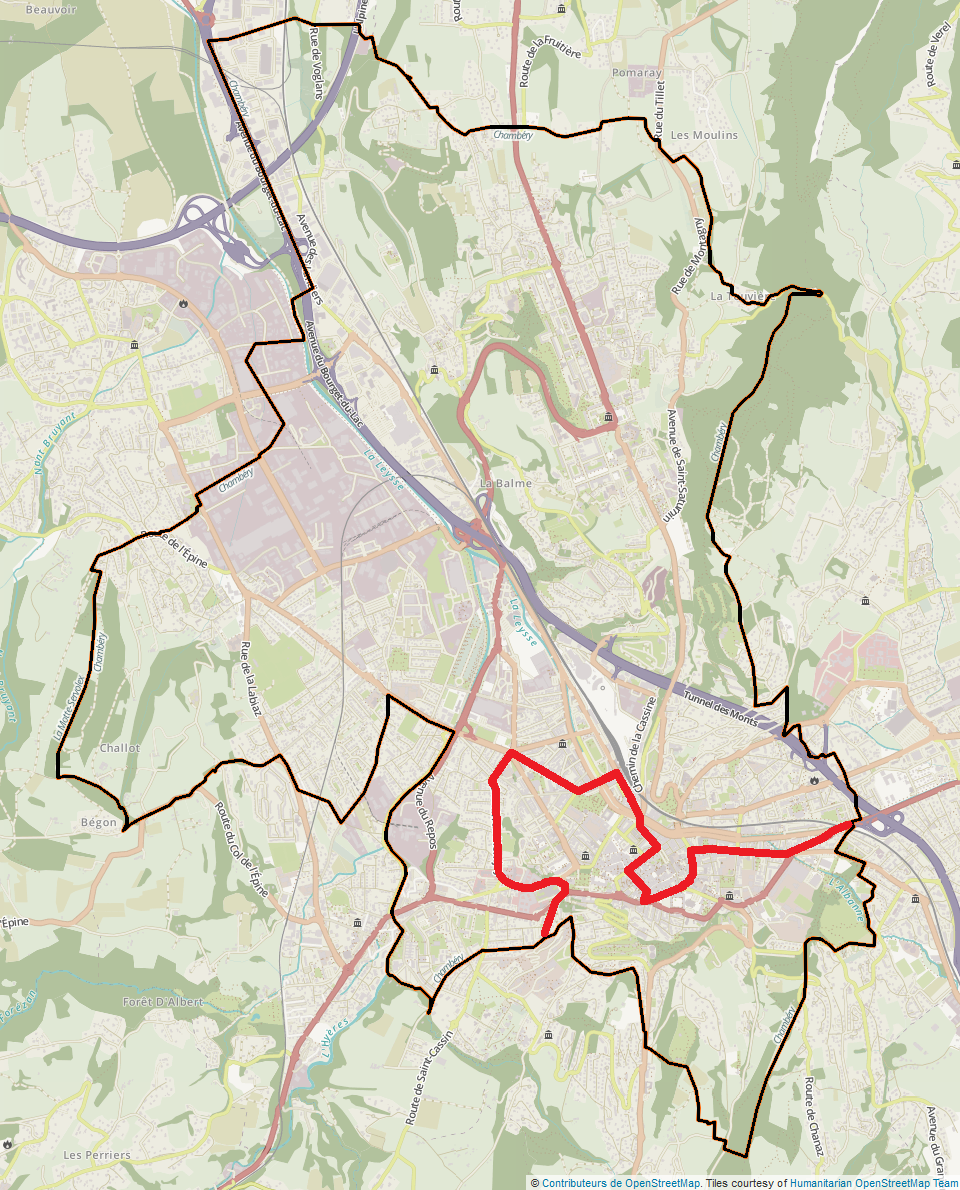
- Country: France
- Region: Auvergne-Rhône-Alpes
- Department: Savoie
- No. of communes: {{{nbcomm}}}
- Disbanded: 2015
- Area: 2.10 km^{2} (0.81 sq mi)
- Population (2012): 13,472
  - Density: 6,420/km^{2} (16,600/sq mi)

The Canton of Chambéry-Sud is a French former administrative subdivision, situated in the Savoie département and the Rhône-Alpes région. It was created in 1860, and its borders were modified in 1973. It was disbanded following the French canton reorganisation which came into effect in March 2015. Its population was 13,472 in 2012. It comprised the southern part of the commune of Chambéry.
