= Apremont, Savoie =

Apremont Opramon (Savoyard)
- Commune
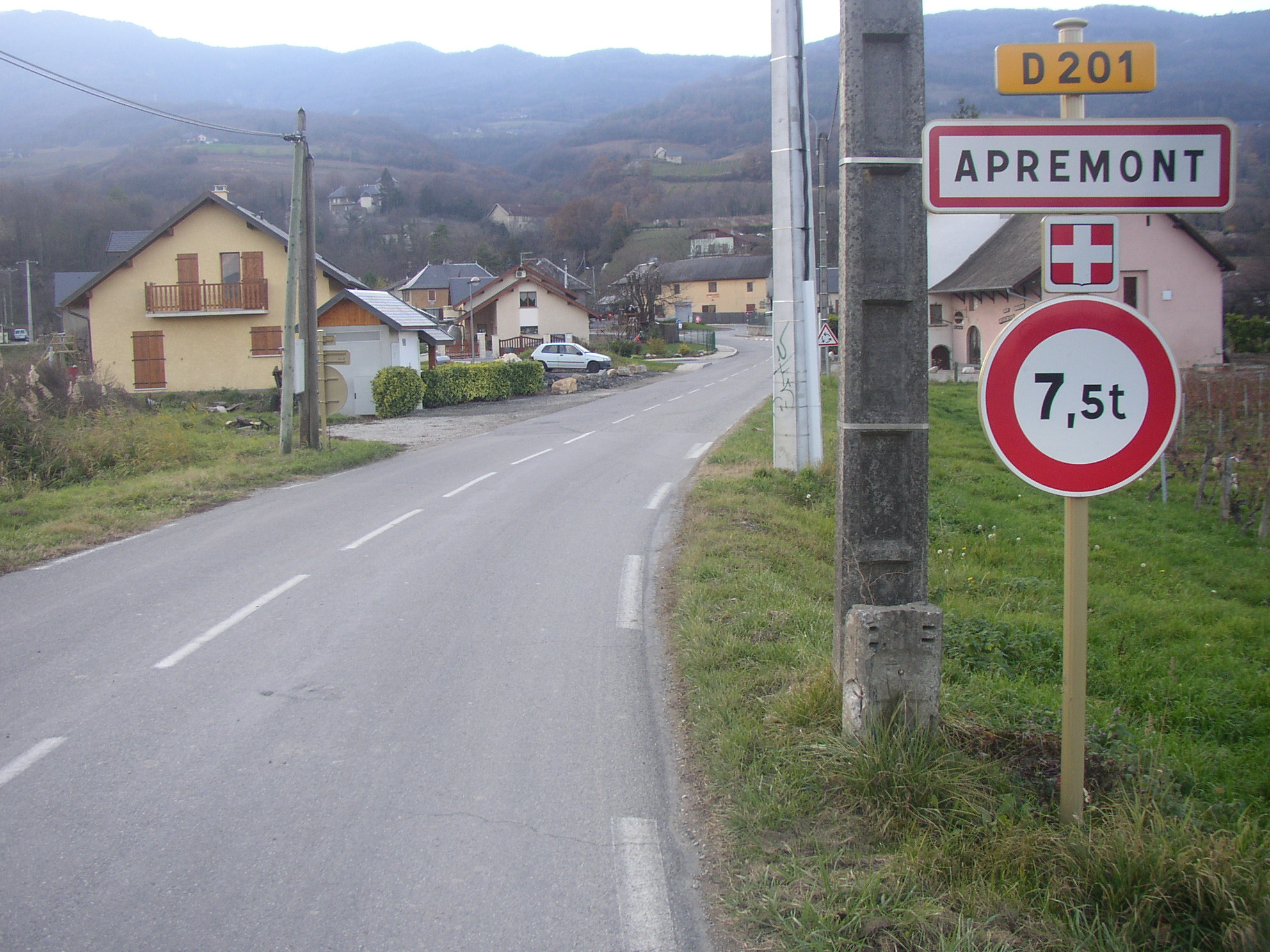
- The road into Apremont

- Coat of arms
- Location of Apremont
- Location within France Location within Auvergne-Rhône-Alpes
- Coordinates: 45°30′54″N 5°57′29″E
- Country: France
- Region: Auvergne-Rhône-Alpes
- Department: Savoie
- Arrondissement: Chambéry
- Canton: Montmélian

Government
  - Mayor (2020–2026): Marc Dupraz
- Area^{1}: 17.76 km^{2} (6.86 sq mi)
- Elevation: 330 m (1,080 ft)
- Highest elevation: 1,554 m (5,098 ft)
- Lowest elevation: 302 m (991 ft)
- Population (2023): 979
  - Density: 55.1/km^{2} (143/sq mi)
- Time zone: UTC+01:00 (CET)
  - Summer (DST): UTC+02:00 (CEST)
- INSEE/Postal code: 73017 /73190
- Dialling codes: 0479
- Website: www.mairie-apremont.com
- ^{1} French Land Register data, which excludes lakes, ponds, glaciers > 1 km^{2} (0.386 sq mi or 247 acres) and river estuaries.

Apremont (French pronunciation: [apʁəmɔ̃]; Arpitan: Opramon) is a commune in the Savoie department in the Auvergne-Rhône-Alpes region in south-eastern France.

It lies southeast of Chambéry.

== Demography ==
Historical population

Year	Pop.	±% p.a.
1793	362	—
1861	892	+1.34%
1911	663	−0.59%
1962	558	−0.34%
1968	558	+0.00%
1975	696	+3.21%
1982	777	+1.59%

Year	Pop.	±% p.a.
1990	781	+0.06%
1999	890	+1.46%
2007	949	+0.81%
2012	982	+0.69%
2017	1,013	+0.62%
2023	979	−0.57%

Source: EHESS and INSEE

== Vineyards ==
In the night of 24 November 1248, a massive landslide remodelled the lands of the commune and created a distinctive environment for growing grapes. At an altitude of 350 metres and catching the morning sun, the vines of Apremont, together with the adjoining communes of Saint-André-les-Marches and Saint-Baldoph have been productive for centuries and are now the major producer in Savoy with around 400 hectares in cultivation. The chalky soil is particularly favourable to white wines, which predominate.

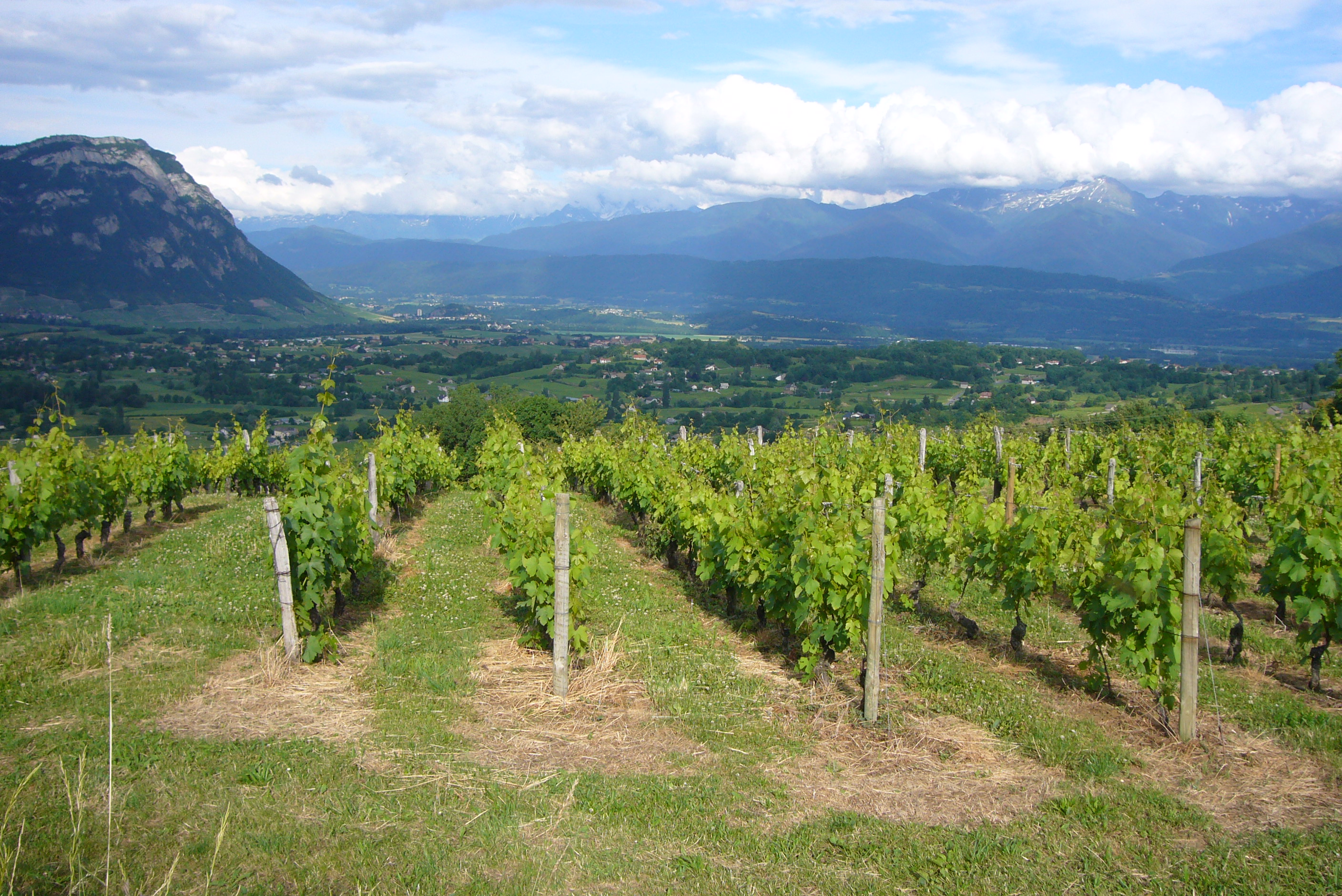
La Cluse de Chambéry and la Combe de Savoie seen from Apremont

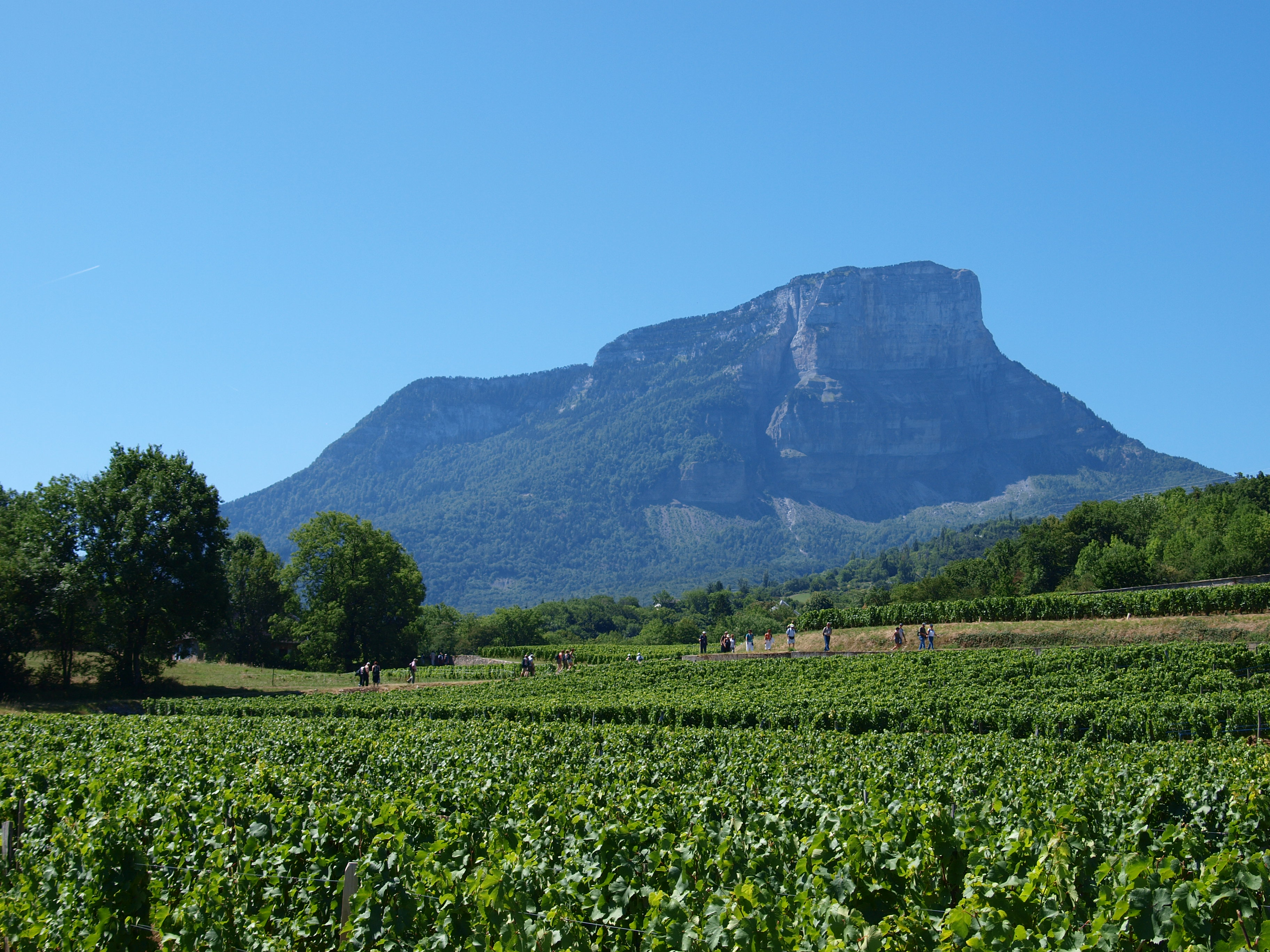
Le Granier and vineyards of Apremont.

== See also ==
- Communes of the Savoie department
