= Planaise =

Planaise Planaïze (Savoyard)
- Commune
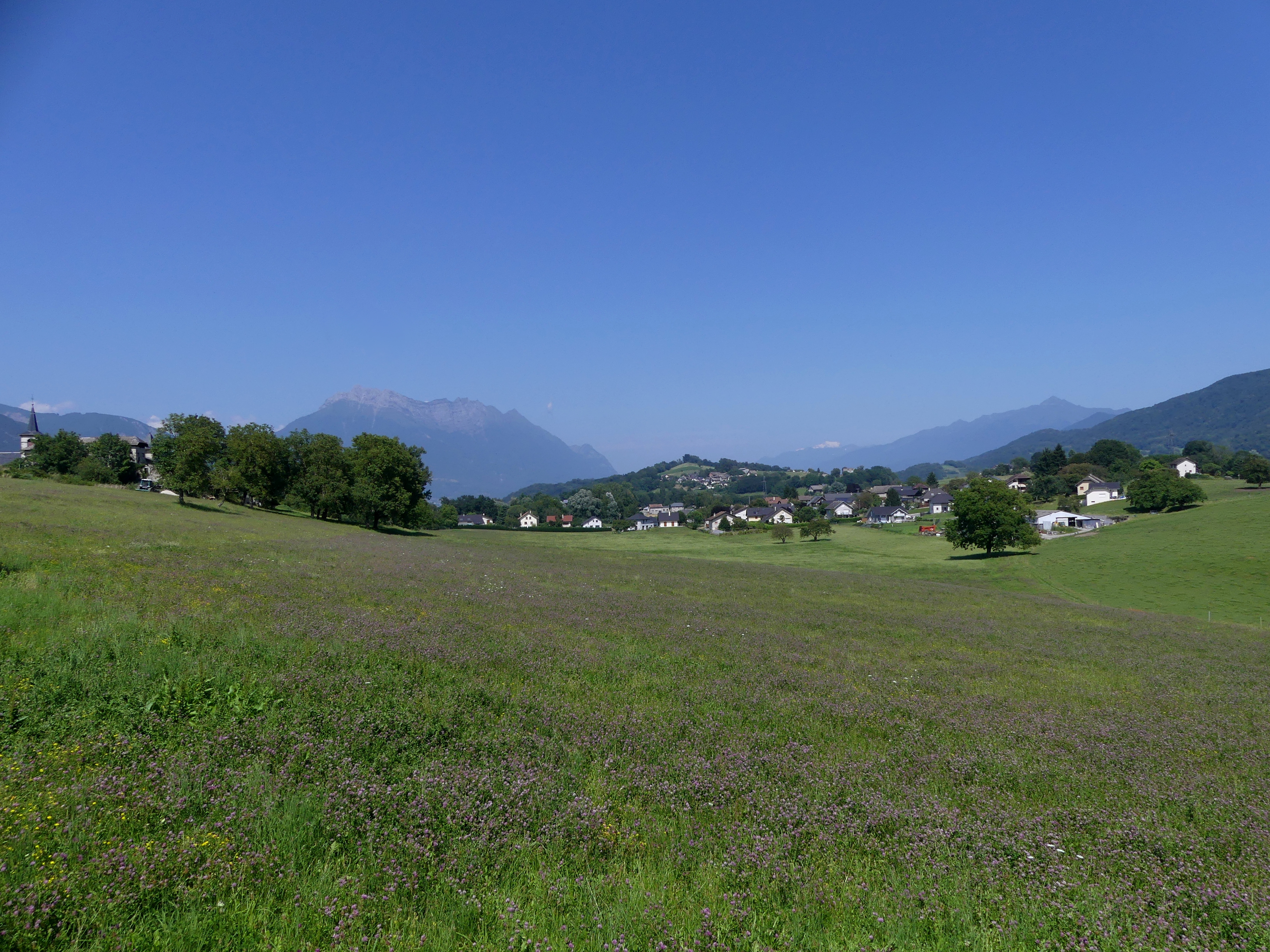
- Planaise (2021)
- Location of Planaise
- Location within France Location within Auvergne-Rhône-Alpes
- Coordinates: 45°30′15″N 6°05′29″E
- Country: France
- Region: Auvergne-Rhône-Alpes
- Department: Savoie
- Arrondissement: Chambéry
- Canton: Montmélian

Government
  - Mayor (2020–2026): Lionel Muraz
- Area^{1}: 4.16 km^{2} (1.61 sq mi)
- Highest elevation: 419 m (1,375 ft)
- Lowest elevation: 272 m (892 ft)
- Population (2023): 560
  - Density: 130/km^{2} (350/sq mi)
- Time zone: UTC+01:00 (CET)
  - Summer (DST): UTC+02:00 (CEST)
- INSEE/Postal code: 73200 /73800
- Website: www.planaise.fr
- ^{1} French Land Register data, which excludes lakes, ponds, glaciers > 1 km^{2} (0.386 sq mi or 247 acres) and river estuaries.

Planaise (French pronunciation: [planɛz]; Savoyard: Planaïze) is a commune in the Savoie department in the Auvergne-Rhône-Alpes region in south-eastern France.

== See also ==
- Communes of the Savoie department
