= Détrier =

- Commune
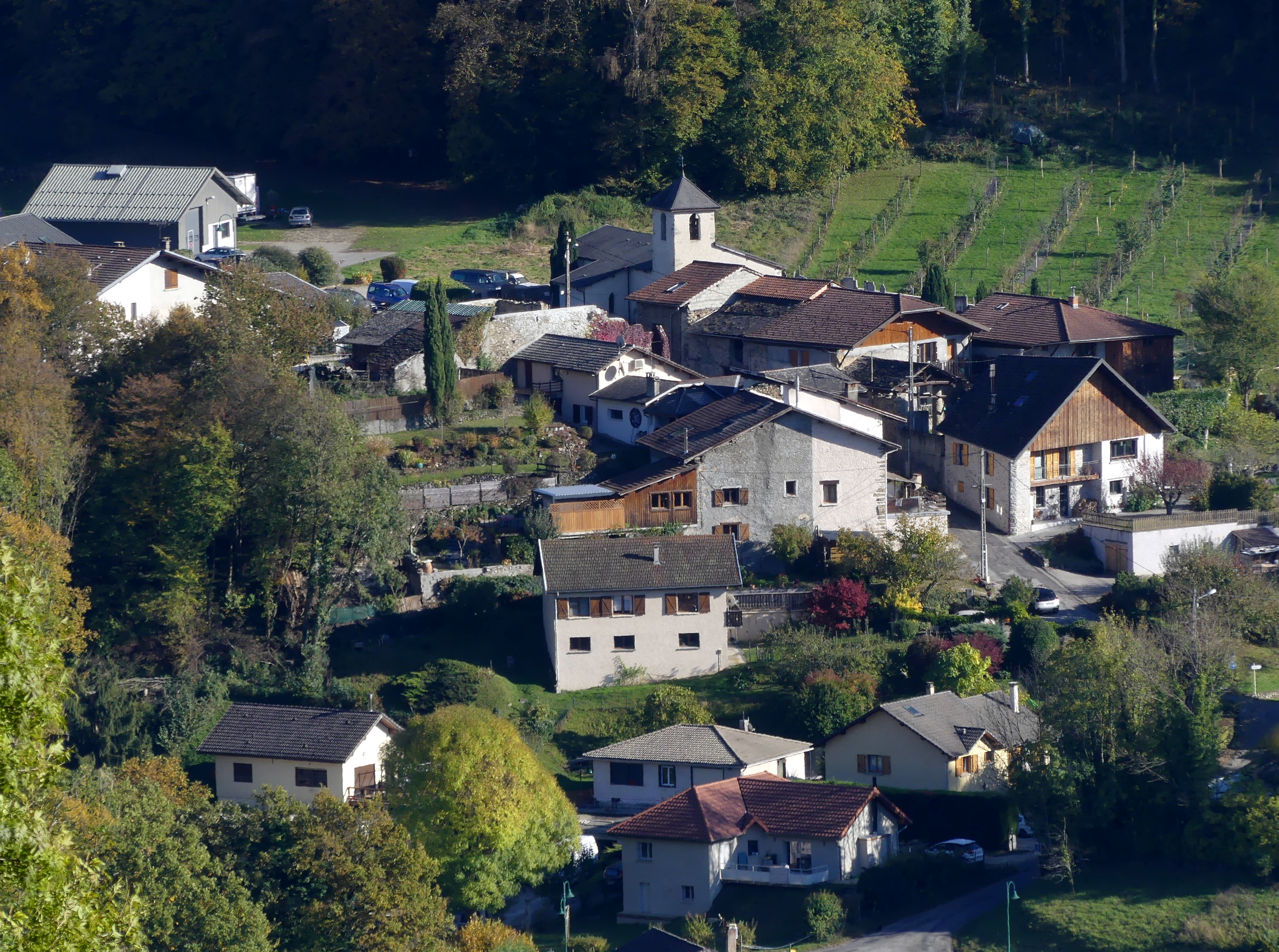
- Location of Détrier
- Location within France Location within Auvergne-Rhône-Alpes
- Coordinates: 45°26′46″N 6°05′57″E
- Country: France
- Region: Auvergne-Rhône-Alpes
- Department: Savoie
- Arrondissement: Chambéry
- Canton: Montmélian

Government
  - Mayor (2020–2026): Alain Sibué
- Area^{1}: 2.25 km^{2} (0.87 sq mi)
- Highest elevation: 762 m (2,500 ft)
- Lowest elevation: 332 m (1,089 ft)
- Population (2023): 427
  - Density: 190/km^{2} (492/sq mi)
- Time zone: UTC+01:00 (CET)
  - Summer (DST): UTC+02:00 (CEST)
- INSEE/Postal code: 73099 /73110
- ^{1} French Land Register data, which excludes lakes, ponds, glaciers > 1 km^{2} (0.386 sq mi or 247 acres) and river estuaries.

Détrier (French pronunciation: [detʁije]) is a commune in the Savoie department in the Auvergne-Rhône-Alpes region in south-eastern France.

== See also ==
- Communes of the Savoie department
