= La Trinité, Savoie =

La Trinité
- Commune
- Location of La Trinité
- Location within France Location within Auvergne-Rhône-Alpes
- Coordinates: 45°29′58″N 6°08′54″E
- Country: France
- Region: Auvergne-Rhône-Alpes
- Department: Savoie
- Arrondissement: Chambéry
- Canton: Montmélian

Government
  - Mayor (2020–2026): Jean-François Duc
- Area^{1}: 4.88 km^{2} (1.88 sq mi)
- Highest elevation: 736 m (2,415 ft)
- Lowest elevation: 292 m (958 ft)
- Population (2023): 381
  - Density: 78.1/km^{2} (202/sq mi)
- Time zone: UTC+01:00 (CET)
  - Summer (DST): UTC+02:00 (CEST)
- INSEE/Postal code: 73302 /73110
- ^{1} French Land Register data, which excludes lakes, ponds, glaciers > 1 km^{2} (0.386 sq mi or 247 acres) and river estuaries.

La Trinité (French pronunciation: [la tʁinite]; Arpitan: La Trinitâ) is a commune in the Savoie department in the Auvergne-Rhône-Alpes region of south-eastern France.

== See also ==
- Communes of the Savoie department
