= Sainte-Hélène-du-Lac =

Sainte-Hélène-du-Lac Sèt-Alèna (Savoyard)
- Commune
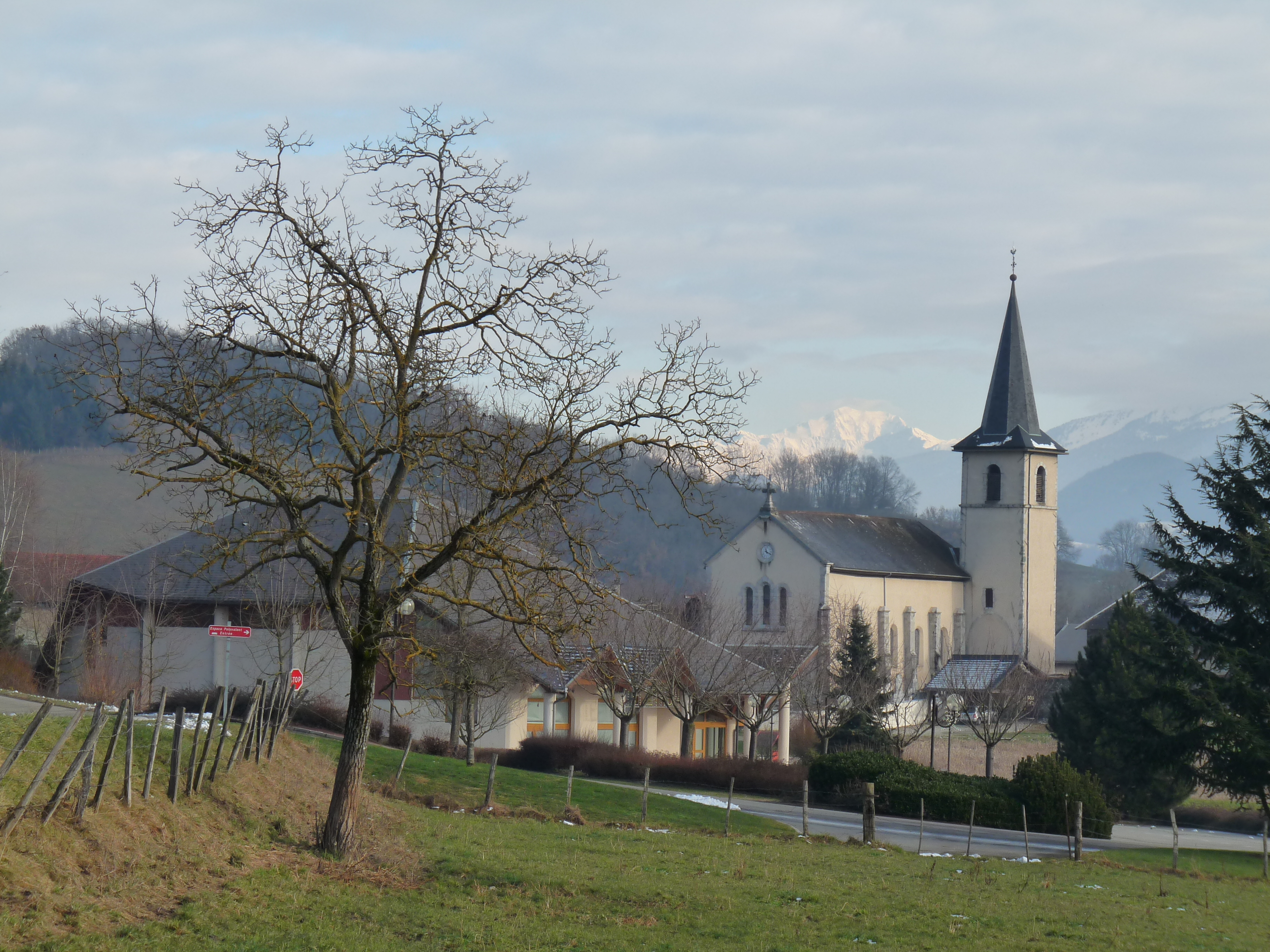
- The church in Sainte-Hélène-du-Lac
- Location of Sainte-Hélène-du-Lac
- Location within France Location within Auvergne-Rhône-Alpes
- Coordinates: 45°28′59″N 6°04′00″E
- Country: France
- Region: Auvergne-Rhône-Alpes
- Department: Savoie
- Arrondissement: Chambéry
- Canton: Montmélian

Government
  - Mayor (2020–2026): Sylvie Schneider
- Area^{1}: 7.09 km^{2} (2.74 sq mi)
- Highest elevation: 370 m (1,210 ft)
- Lowest elevation: 252 m (827 ft)
- Population (2023): 855
  - Density: 121/km^{2} (312/sq mi)
- Time zone: UTC+01:00 (CET)
  - Summer (DST): UTC+02:00 (CEST)
- INSEE/Postal code: 73240 /73800
- ^{1} French Land Register data, which excludes lakes, ponds, glaciers > 1 km^{2} (0.386 sq mi or 247 acres) and river estuaries.

Sainte-Hélène-du-Lac (French pronunciation: [sɛ̃t elɛn dy lak], literally Sainte-Hélène of the Lake; Savoyard: Sèt-Alèna) is a commune in the Savoie department in the Auvergne-Rhône-Alpes region in south-eastern France.

== See also ==
- Communes of the Savoie department
