= Laissaud =

- Commune
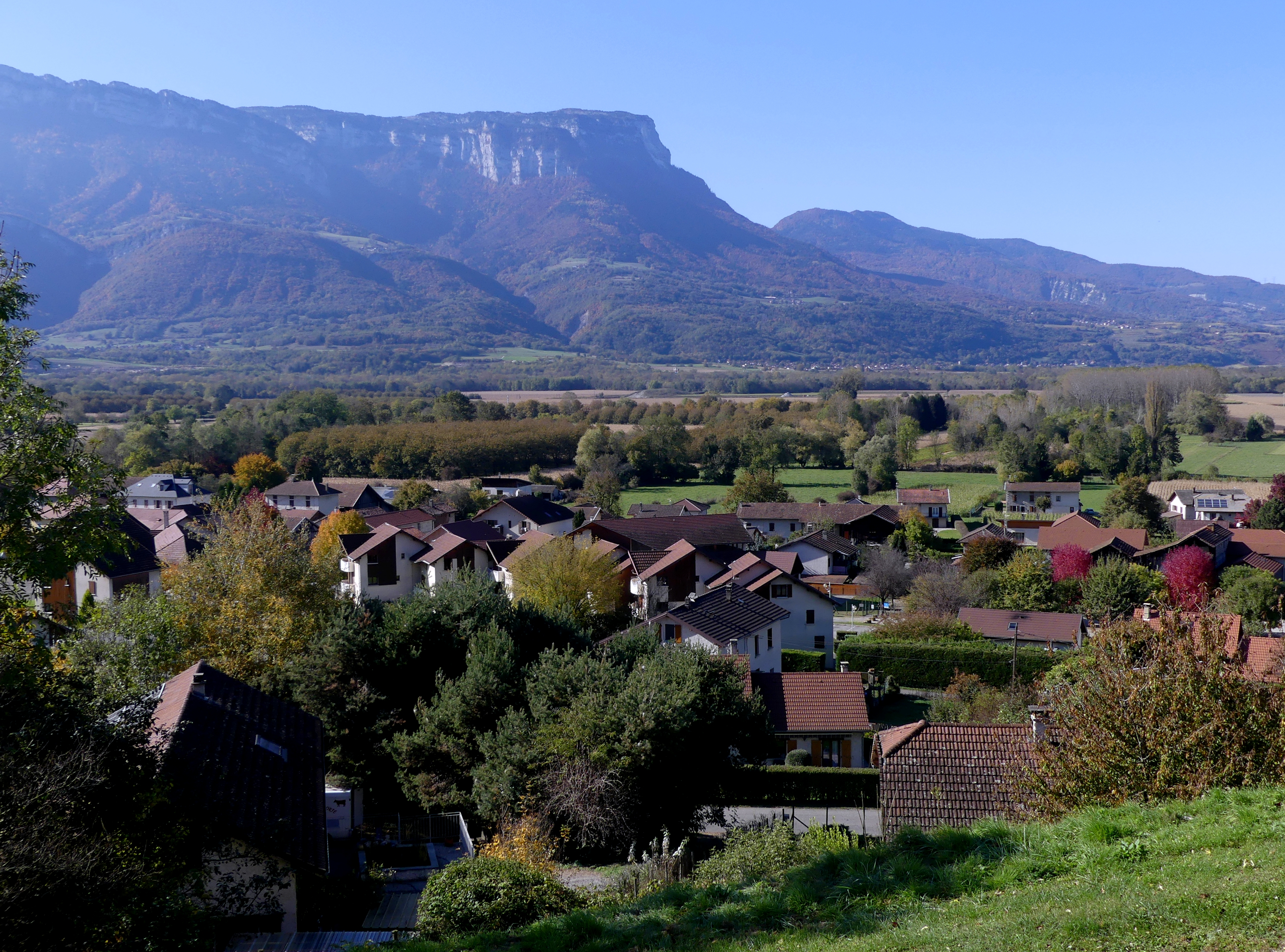
- A general view of Laissaud
- Location of Laissaud
- Location within France Location within Auvergne-Rhône-Alpes
- Coordinates: 45°26′52″N 6°02′14″E
- Country: France
- Region: Auvergne-Rhône-Alpes
- Department: Savoie
- Arrondissement: Chambéry
- Canton: Montmélian

Government
  - Mayor (2020–2026): Nathalie Pomeon
- Area^{1}: 6.57 km^{2} (2.54 sq mi)
- Elevation: 260 m (850 ft)
- Highest elevation: 433 m (1,421 ft)
- Lowest elevation: 245 m (804 ft)
- Population (2023): 778
  - Density: 118/km^{2} (307/sq mi)
- Time zone: UTC+01:00 (CET)
  - Summer (DST): UTC+02:00 (CEST)
- INSEE/Postal code: 73141 /73800
- Dialling codes: 0479
- ^{1} French Land Register data, which excludes lakes, ponds, glaciers > 1 km^{2} (0.386 sq mi or 247 acres) and river estuaries.

Laissaud (French pronunciation: [lɛso]) is a commune in the Savoie department in the Auvergne-Rhône-Alpes region in south-eastern France.

It is 16 km southeast of Chambéry.

== See also ==
- Communes of the Savoie department
