= La Chapelle-Blanche, Savoie =

La Chapelle-Blanche La Shapéla Blinshe (Savoyard)
- Commune
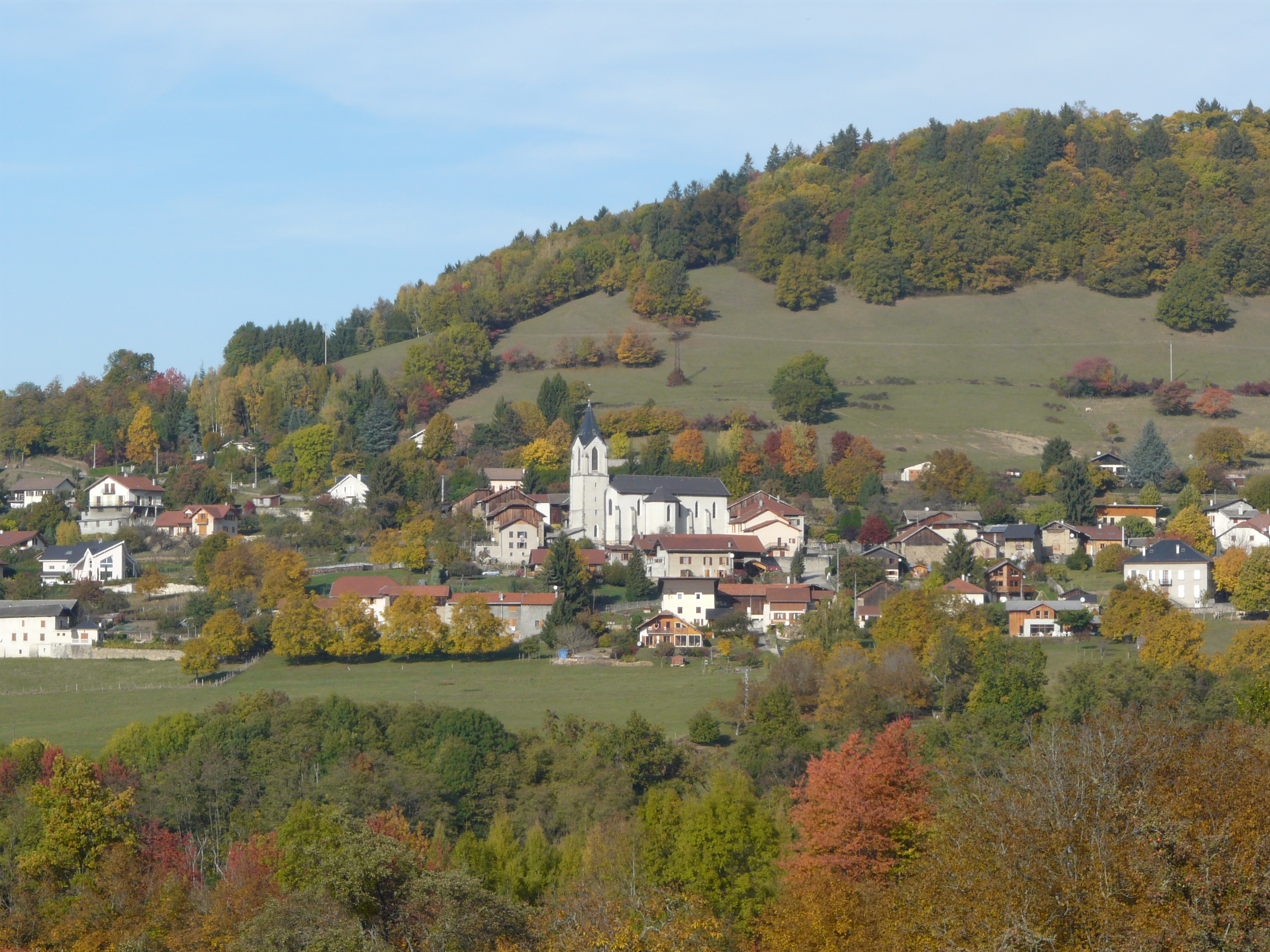
- A general view of La Chapelle-Blanche
- Location of La Chapelle-Blanche
- Location within France Location within Auvergne-Rhône-Alpes
- Coordinates: 45°26′55″N 6°04′23″E
- Country: France
- Region: Auvergne-Rhône-Alpes
- Department: Savoie
- Arrondissement: Chambéry
- Canton: Montmélian

Government
  - Mayor (2020–2026): Stéphane Duparc
- Area^{1}: 4.13 km^{2} (1.59 sq mi)
- Highest elevation: 732 m (2,402 ft)
- Lowest elevation: 296 m (971 ft)
- Population (2023): 596
  - Density: 144/km^{2} (374/sq mi)
- Time zone: UTC+01:00 (CET)
  - Summer (DST): UTC+02:00 (CEST)
- INSEE/Postal code: 73075 /73110
- ^{1} French Land Register data, which excludes lakes, ponds, glaciers > 1 km^{2} (0.386 sq mi or 247 acres) and river estuaries.

La Chapelle-Blanche (French pronunciation: [la ʃapɛl blɑ̃ʃ], literally The White Chapel; Savoyard: La Shapéla Blinshe) is a commune in the Savoie department in the Auvergne-Rhône-Alpes region in south-eastern France. The village is located in the Combe de Savoie, on the southwestern slope of the hill Montraillant.

== History ==
The town of La Chapelle-Blanche historically belongs to the French Dauphiné province. It was ceded to the Duchy of Savoy on 24 March 1760 by the Convention of Turin.

The parish was joined to the parish of Villaroux from 1803 to 1825.

The Savoy region, which included La Chapelle-Blanche, was annexed by France in 1860 following a plebiscite.

== Notable people ==
- Amélie Gex, (1835–1883), writer, noted for her works of poetry and prose in the Franco-Provençal (Arpitan) language. Note: A monument honoring Amélie Gex stands in the town.
- Louis Edmond Seraphin Charvet (1901–1987); industrialist; CEO of Air France; mayor of La Chapelle-Blanche in 1959; poet known by the pseudonym "Evrard of Millières"; and creator of the La Chapelle-Blanche Theatre Festival.

== See also ==
- Communes of the Savoie department
