= Bourget-en-Huile =

Bourget-en-Huile Le Borzhè en Ulye (Savoyard)
- Commune
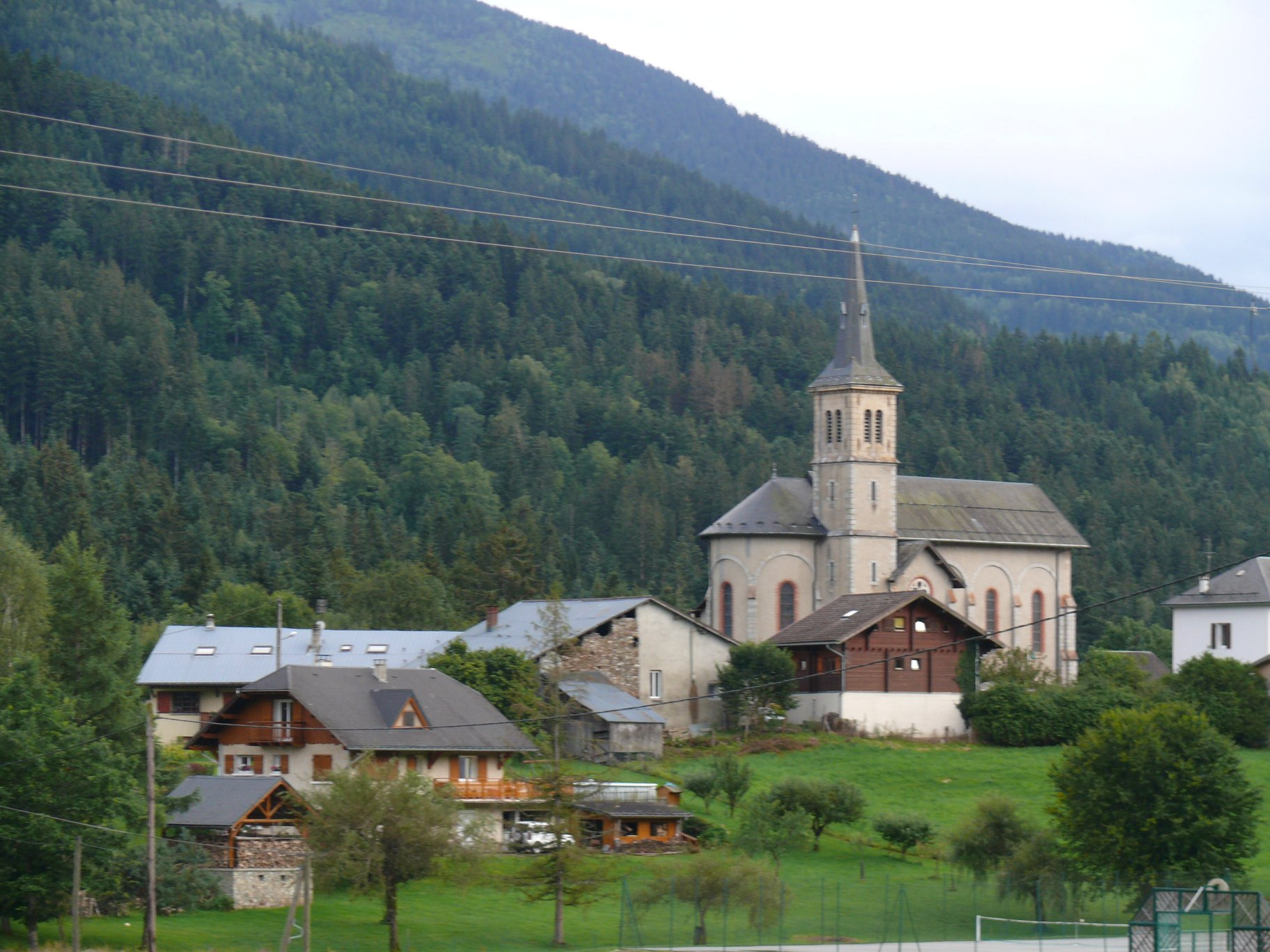
- The church and surrounding buildings in Bourget-en-Huile
- Location of Bourget-en-Huile
- Location within France Location within Auvergne-Rhône-Alpes
- Coordinates: 45°29′08″N 6°12′28″E
- Country: France
- Region: Auvergne-Rhône-Alpes
- Department: Savoie
- Arrondissement: Chambéry
- Canton: Montmélian

Government
  - Mayor (2020–2026): Régis Barbaz
- Area^{1}: 6.79 km^{2} (2.62 sq mi)
- Highest elevation: 1,744 m (5,722 ft)
- Lowest elevation: 795 m (2,608 ft)
- Population (2023): 142
  - Density: 20.9/km^{2} (54.2/sq mi)
- Time zone: UTC+01:00 (CET)
  - Summer (DST): UTC+02:00 (CEST)
- INSEE/Postal code: 73052 /73110
- ^{1} French Land Register data, which excludes lakes, ponds, glaciers > 1 km^{2} (0.386 sq mi or 247 acres) and river estuaries.

Bourget-en-Huile (Savoyard: Le Borzhè en Ulye) is a commune in the Savoie department in the Auvergne-Rhône-Alpes region in south-eastern France.

== See also ==
- Communes of the Savoie department
