= La Chavanne =

- Commune
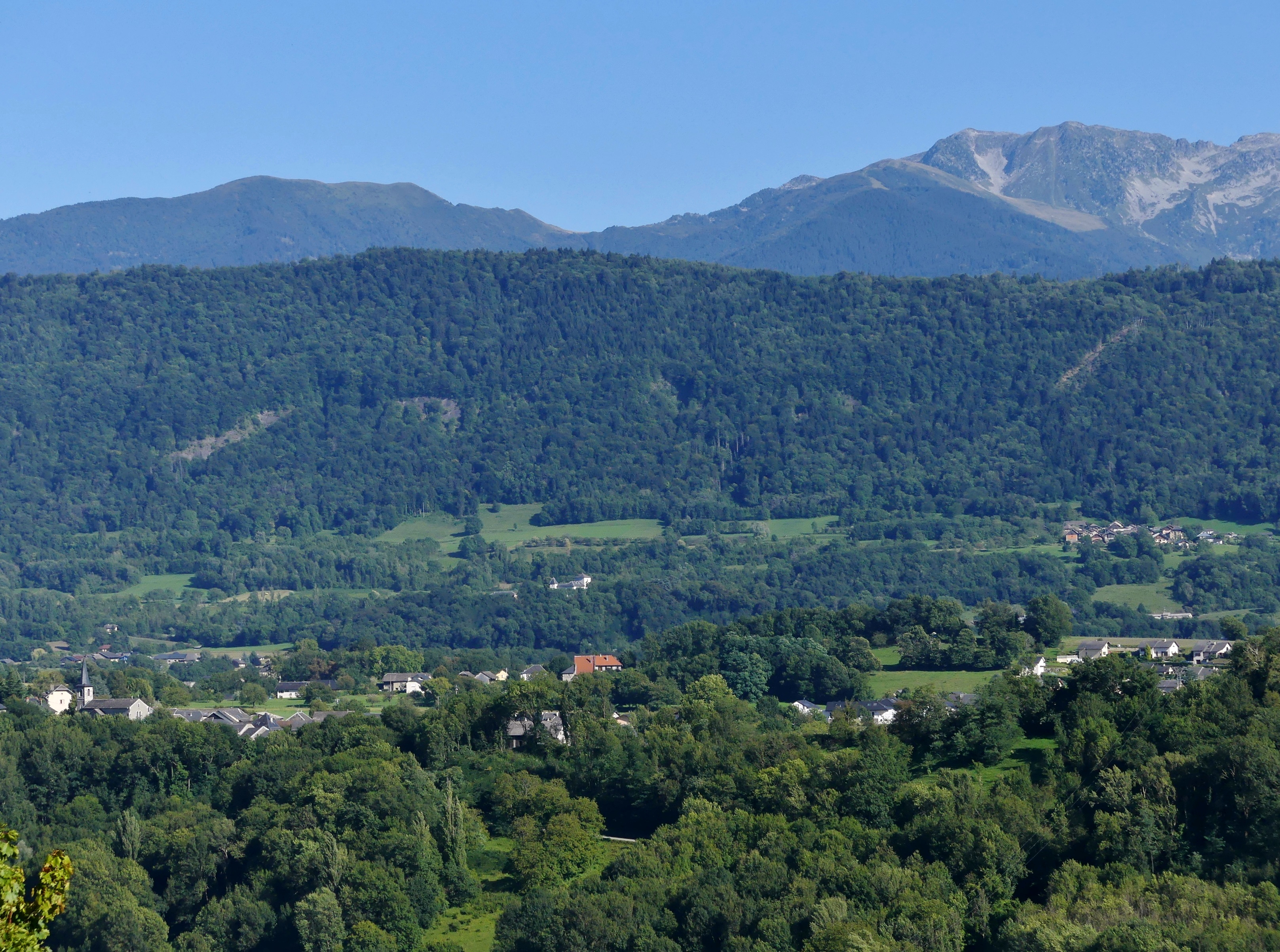
- La Chavanne seen from the hill of Montmélian
- Location of La Chavanne
- Location within France Location within Auvergne-Rhône-Alpes
- Coordinates: 45°29′45″N 6°04′32″E
- Country: France
- Region: Auvergne-Rhône-Alpes
- Department: Savoie
- Arrondissement: Chambéry
- Canton: Montmélian

Government
  - Mayor (2020–2026): Michel Duret
- Area^{1}: 3.06 km^{2} (1.18 sq mi)
- Elevation: 305 m (1,001 ft)
- Highest elevation: 365 m (1,198 ft)
- Lowest elevation: 257 m (843 ft)
- Population (2023): 720
  - Density: 240/km^{2} (610/sq mi)
- Time zone: UTC+01:00 (CET)
  - Summer (DST): UTC+02:00 (CEST)
- INSEE/Postal code: 73082 /73800
- Dialling codes: 0479
- ^{1} French Land Register data, which excludes lakes, ponds, glaciers > 1 km^{2} (0.386 sq mi or 247 acres) and river estuaries.

La Chavanne (French pronunciation: [la ʃavan]; Arpitan: La Shavana) is a commune in the Savoie department in the Auvergne-Rhône-Alpes region in south-eastern France.

== See also ==
- Communes of the Savoie department
