= Les Mollettes =

Les Mollettes Lé Molète (Savoyard)
- Commune
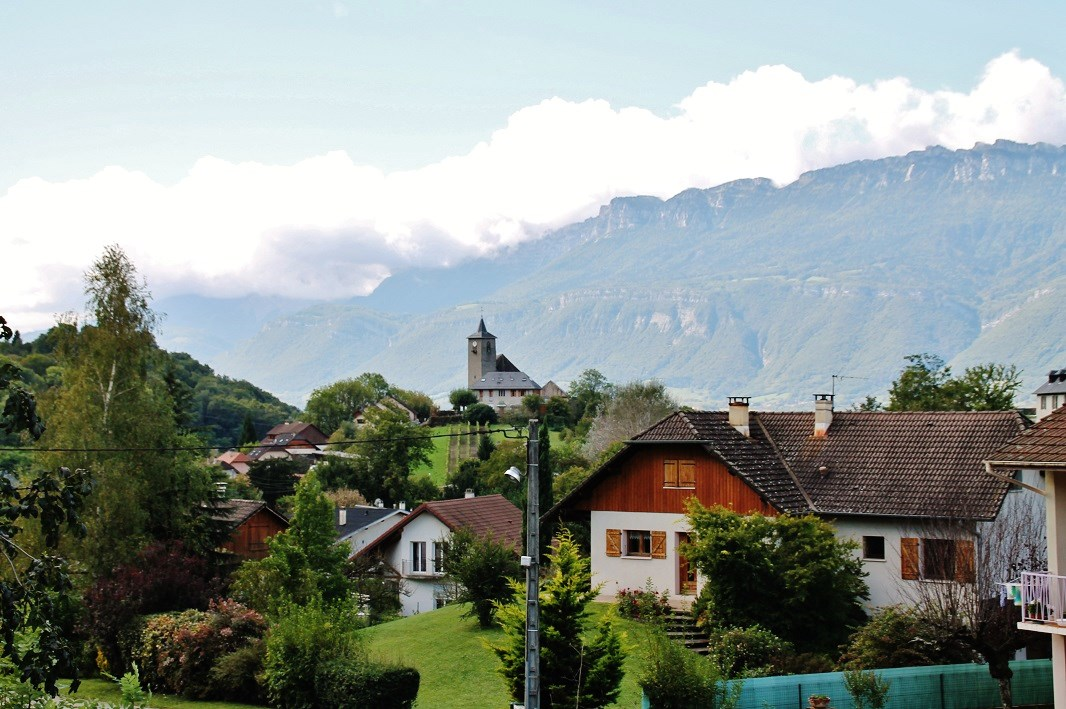
- The church and surrounding buildings in Les Mollettes
- Location of Les Mollettes
- Location within France Location within Auvergne-Rhône-Alpes
- Coordinates: 45°27′52″N 6°03′35″E
- Country: France
- Region: Auvergne-Rhône-Alpes
- Department: Savoie
- Arrondissement: Chambéry
- Canton: Montmélian

Government
  - Mayor (2021–2026): Jean-Claude Nicolle
- Area^{1}: 5.47 km^{2} (2.11 sq mi)
- Elevation: 272 m (892 ft)
- Highest elevation: 529 m (1,736 ft)
- Lowest elevation: 255 m (837 ft)
- Population (2023): 870
  - Density: 160/km^{2} (410/sq mi)
- Time zone: UTC+01:00 (CET)
  - Summer (DST): UTC+02:00 (CEST)
- INSEE/Postal code: 73159 /73800
- Dialling codes: 0479
- ^{1} French Land Register data, which excludes lakes, ponds, glaciers > 1 km^{2} (0.386 sq mi or 247 acres) and river estuaries.

Les Mollettes (Savoyard: Lé Molète) is a commune in the Savoie department in the Auvergne-Rhône-Alpes region in south-eastern France.

== See also ==
- Communes of the Savoie department
