= Rotherens =

Rotherens Rotrin (Savoyard)
- Commune
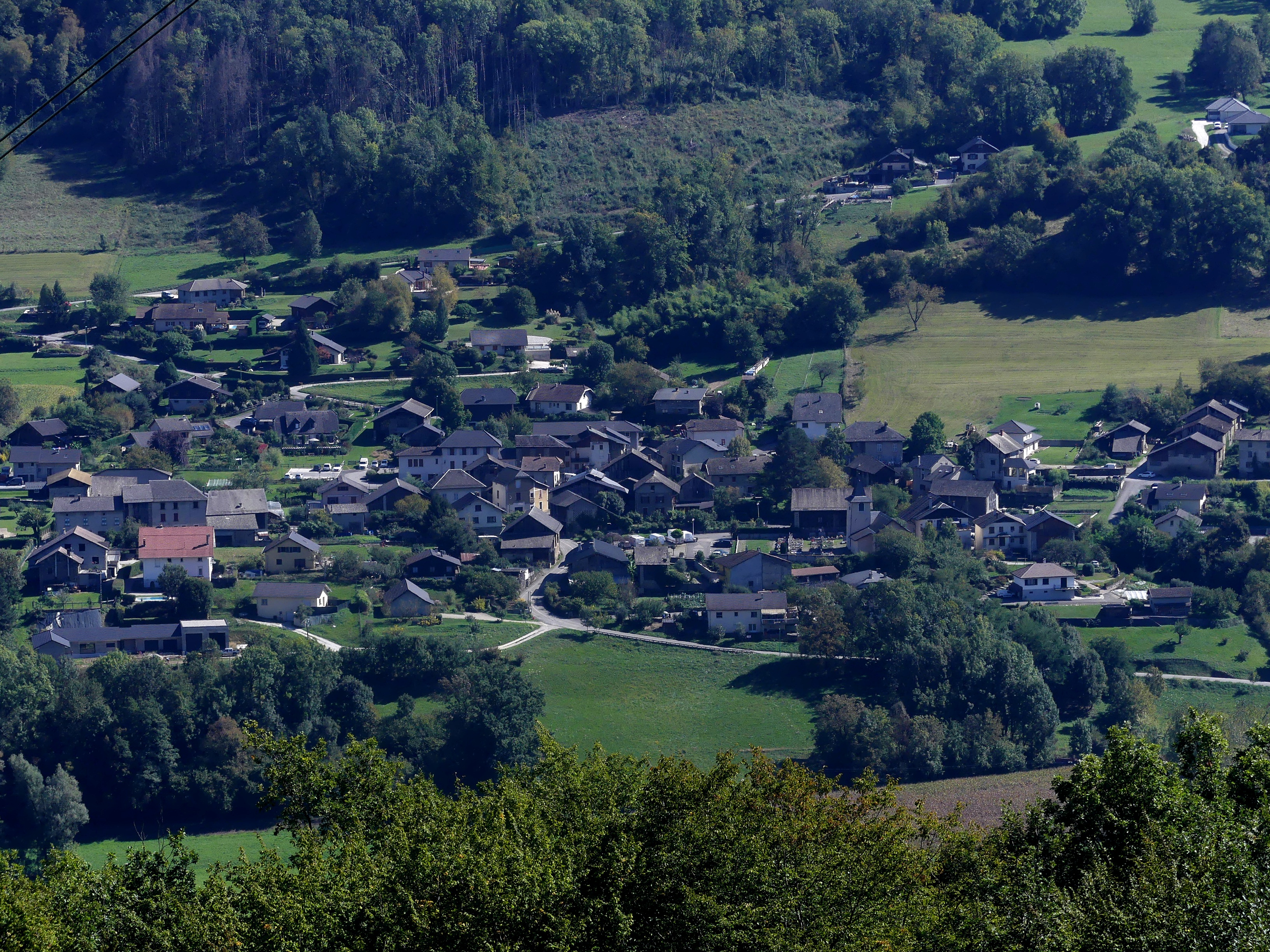
- Location of Rotherens
- Location within France Location within Auvergne-Rhône-Alpes
- Coordinates: 45°28′25″N 6°08′13″E
- Country: France
- Region: Auvergne-Rhône-Alpes
- Department: Savoie
- Arrondissement: Chambéry
- Canton: Montmélian

Government
  - Mayor (2020–2026): Michel Symanzik
- Area^{1}: 1.74 km^{2} (0.67 sq mi)
- Highest elevation: 531 m (1,742 ft)
- Lowest elevation: 311 m (1,020 ft)
- Population (2023): 371
  - Density: 213/km^{2} (552/sq mi)
- Time zone: UTC+01:00 (CET)
  - Summer (DST): UTC+02:00 (CEST)
- INSEE/Postal code: 73217 /73110
- ^{1} French Land Register data, which excludes lakes, ponds, glaciers > 1 km^{2} (0.386 sq mi or 247 acres) and river estuaries.

Rotherens (Savoyard: Rotrin) is a commune in the Savoie department in the Auvergne-Rhône-Alpes region in south-eastern France.

== See also ==
- Communes of the Savoie department
