= Le Pontet, Savoie =

Le Pontet Le Ponté (Savoyard)
- Commune
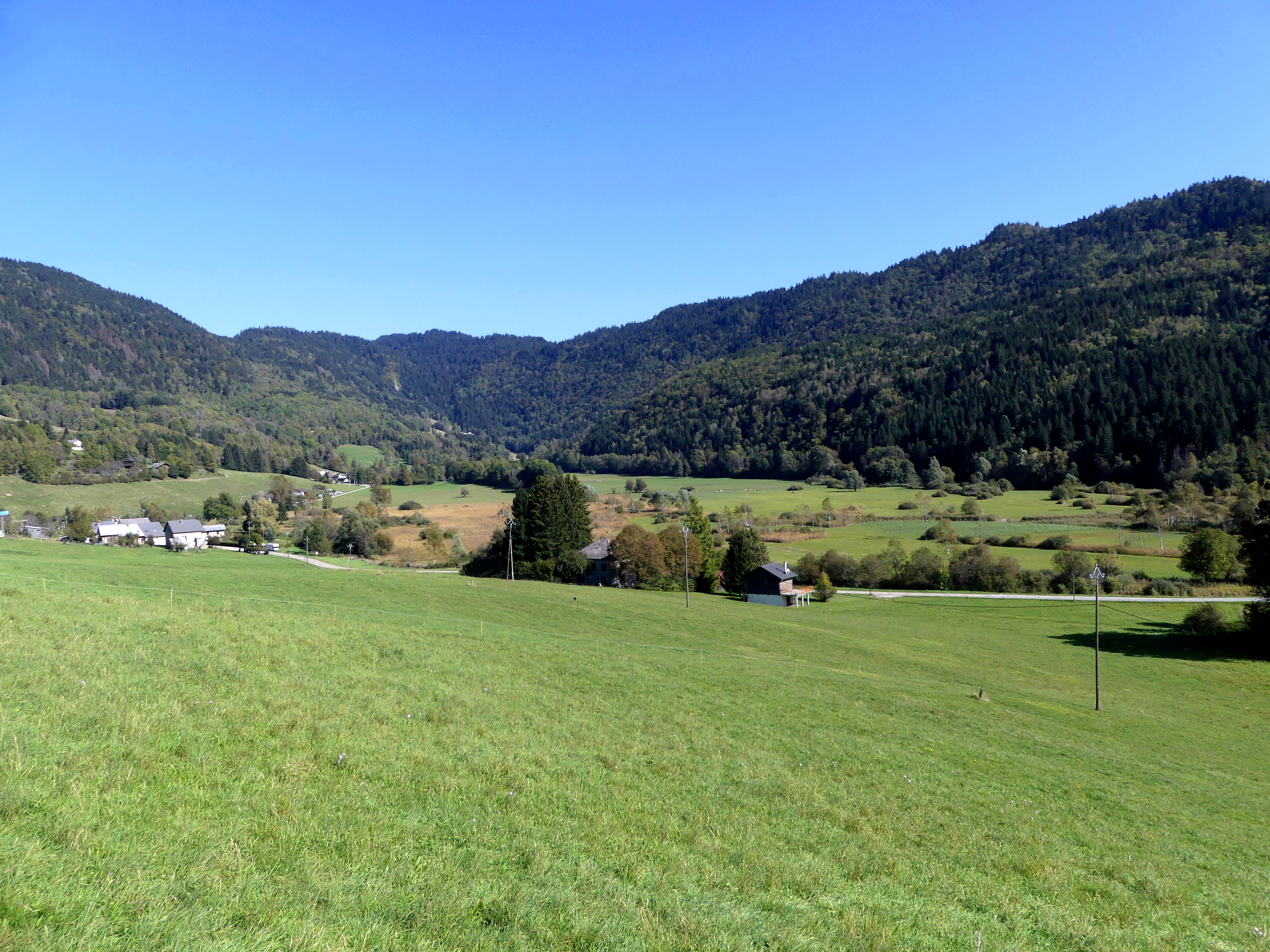
- Le Pontet, Savoie
- Location of Le Pontet
- Location within France Location within Auvergne-Rhône-Alpes
- Coordinates: 45°29′56″N 6°13′48″E
- Country: France
- Region: Auvergne-Rhône-Alpes
- Department: Savoie
- Arrondissement: Chambéry
- Canton: Montmélian

Government
  - Mayor (2020–2026): André Dazy
- Area^{1}: 8.66 km^{2} (3.34 sq mi)
- Highest elevation: 1,569 m (5,148 ft)
- Lowest elevation: 833 m (2,733 ft)
- Population (2023): 133
  - Density: 15.4/km^{2} (39.8/sq mi)
- Time zone: UTC+01:00 (CET)
  - Summer (DST): UTC+02:00 (CEST)
- INSEE/Postal code: 73205 /73110
- ^{1} French Land Register data, which excludes lakes, ponds, glaciers > 1 km^{2} (0.386 sq mi or 247 acres) and river estuaries.

Le Pontet (French pronunciation: [lə pɔ̃tɛ]; Savoyard: Le Ponté) is a commune in the Savoie department in the Auvergne-Rhône-Alpes region in south-eastern France.

== See also ==
- Communes of the Savoie department
