= Villard-d'Héry =

Villard-d'Héry Vlâr d Éri (Savoyard)
- Commune
- Location of Villard-d'Héry
- Location within France Location within Auvergne-Rhône-Alpes
- Coordinates: 45°30′55″N 6°08′18″E
- Country: France
- Region: Auvergne-Rhône-Alpes
- Department: Savoie
- Arrondissement: Chambéry
- Canton: Montmélian

Government
  - Mayor (2020–2026): Éric Sandraz
- Area^{1}: 4.9 km^{2} (1.9 sq mi)
- Highest elevation: 736 m (2,415 ft)
- Lowest elevation: 267 m (876 ft)
- Population (2023): 270
  - Density: 55/km^{2} (140/sq mi)
- Time zone: UTC+01:00 (CET)
  - Summer (DST): UTC+02:00 (CEST)
- INSEE/Postal code: 73314 /73800
- ^{1} French Land Register data, which excludes lakes, ponds, glaciers > 1 km^{2} (0.386 sq mi or 247 acres) and river estuaries.

Villard-d'Héry (Savoyard: Vlâr d Éri) is a commune in the Savoie department in the Auvergne-Rhône-Alpes region in south-eastern France.

== See also ==
- Communes of the Savoie department
