= Villard-Sallet =

Villard-Sallet Vlâ Salè (Savoyard)
- Commune
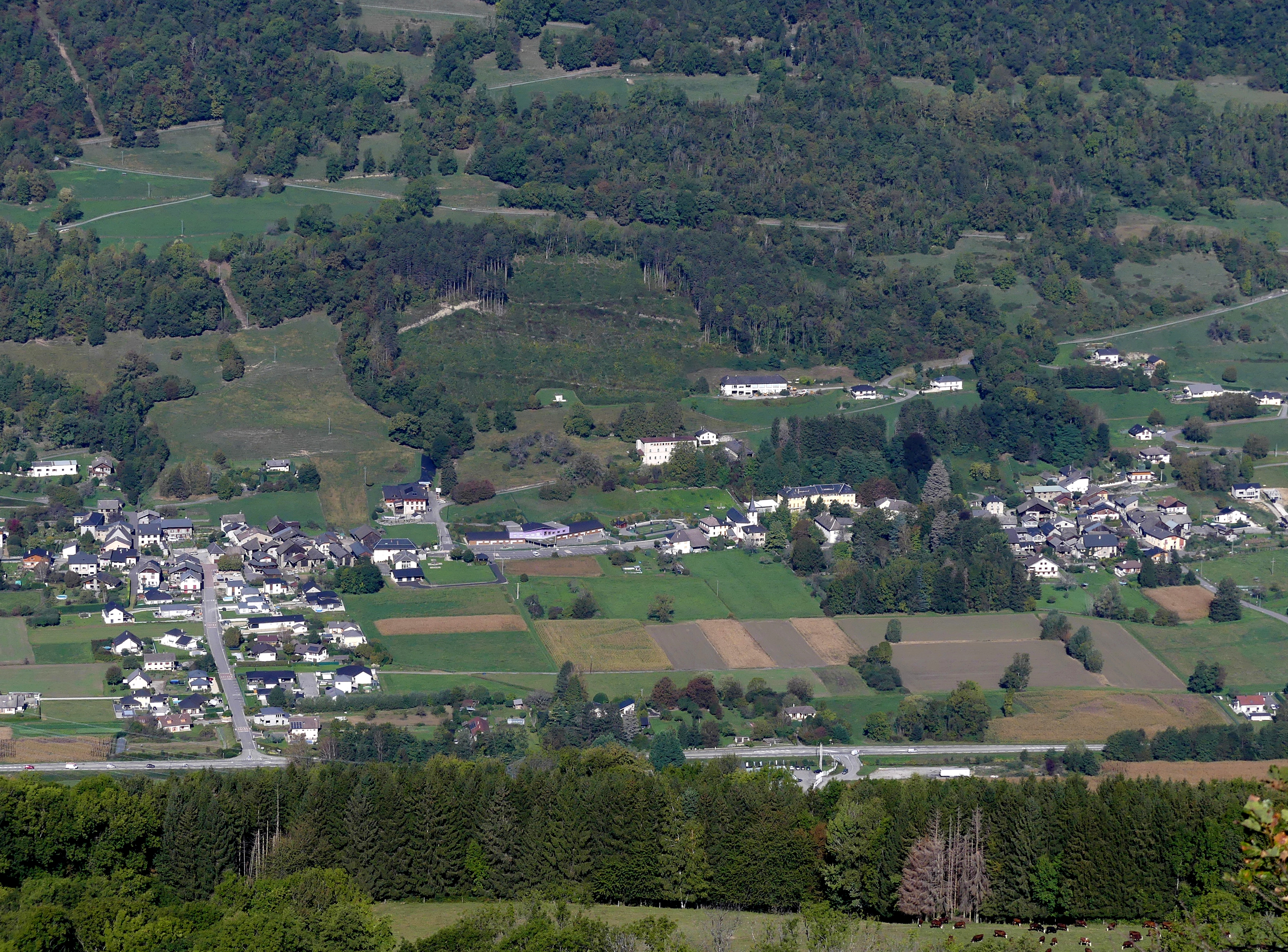
- Location of Villard-Sallet
- Location within France Location within Auvergne-Rhône-Alpes
- Coordinates: 45°29′09″N 6°08′20″E
- Country: France
- Region: Auvergne-Rhône-Alpes
- Department: Savoie
- Arrondissement: Chambéry
- Canton: Montmélian

Government
  - Mayor (2020–2026): Jean-Claude Mestrallet
- Area^{1}: 3.14 km^{2} (1.21 sq mi)
- Highest elevation: 806 m (2,644 ft)
- Lowest elevation: 302 m (991 ft)
- Population (2023): 310
  - Density: 99/km^{2} (260/sq mi)
- Time zone: UTC+01:00 (CET)
  - Summer (DST): UTC+02:00 (CEST)
- INSEE/Postal code: 73316 /73110
- ^{1} French Land Register data, which excludes lakes, ponds, glaciers > 1 km^{2} (0.386 sq mi or 247 acres) and river estuaries.

Villard-Sallet (Savoyard: Vlâ Salè) is a commune in the Savoie department in the Auvergne-Rhône-Alpes region in south-eastern France.

== See also ==
- Communes of the Savoie department
