= Villard-Léger =

Villard-Léger Vlâ-Lézhé (Savoyard)
- Commune
- Coat of arms
- Location of Villard-Léger
- Location within France Location within Auvergne-Rhône-Alpes
- Coordinates: 45°30′57″N 6°11′08″E
- Country: France
- Region: Auvergne-Rhône-Alpes
- Department: Savoie
- Arrondissement: Chambéry
- Canton: Saint-Pierre-d'Albigny

Government
  - Mayor (2020–2026): Christiane Favre
- Area^{1}: 6.73 km^{2} (2.60 sq mi)
- Highest elevation: 1,025 m (3,363 ft)
- Lowest elevation: 293 m (961 ft)
- Population (2023): 433
  - Density: 64.3/km^{2} (167/sq mi)
- Time zone: UTC+01:00 (CET)
  - Summer (DST): UTC+02:00 (CEST)
- INSEE/Postal code: 73315 /73390
- ^{1} French Land Register data, which excludes lakes, ponds, glaciers > 1 km^{2} (0.386 sq mi or 247 acres) and river estuaries.

Villard-Léger (Savoyard: Vlâ-Lézhé) is a commune in the Savoie department in the Auvergne-Rhône-Alpes region in south-eastern France.

== See also ==
- Communes of the Savoie department
