= Arbin, Savoie =

Arbin
- Commune
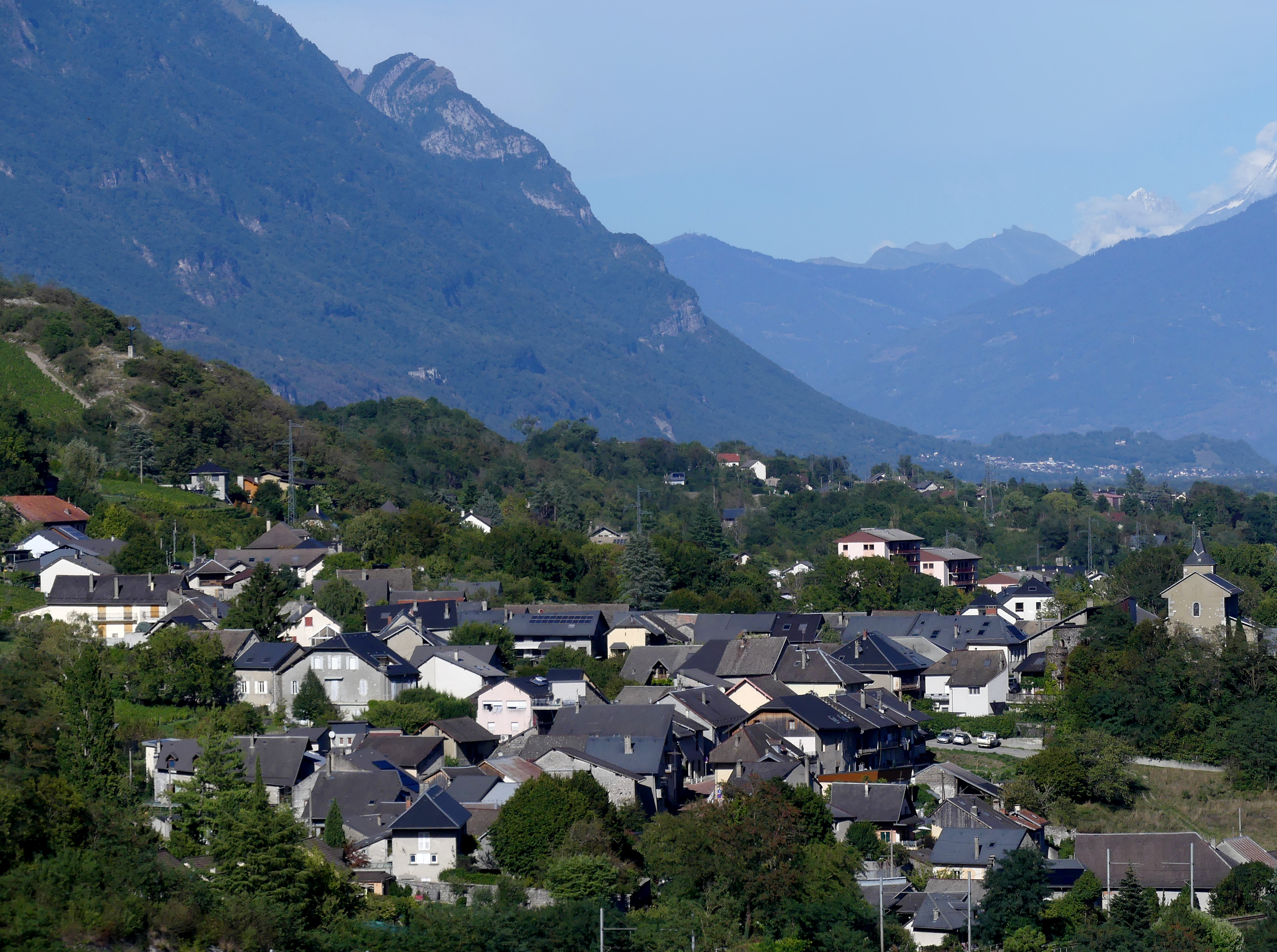

- Coat of arms
- Location of Arbin
- Location within France Location within Auvergne-Rhône-Alpes
- Coordinates: 45°30′33″N 6°04′03″E
- Country: France
- Region: Auvergne-Rhône-Alpes
- Department: Savoie
- Arrondissement: Chambéry
- Canton: Montmélian

Government
  - Mayor (2020–2026): Carlo Appratti
- Area^{1}: 1.71 km^{2} (0.66 sq mi)
- Elevation: 282 m (925 ft)
- Highest elevation: 499 m (1,637 ft)
- Lowest elevation: 271 m (889 ft)
- Population (2023): 841
  - Density: 492/km^{2} (1,270/sq mi)
- Time zone: UTC+01:00 (CET)
  - Summer (DST): UTC+02:00 (CEST)
- INSEE/Postal code: 73018 /73800
- Dialling codes: 0479
- ^{1} French Land Register data, which excludes lakes, ponds, glaciers > 1 km^{2} (0.386 sq mi or 247 acres) and river estuaries.

Arbin (French pronunciation: [aʁbɛ̃]) is a commune in the Savoie department in the Auvergne-Rhône-Alpes region in south-eastern France.

It lies southeast of Chambéry.

== See also ==
- Communes of the Savoie department
