= Villaroux =

Villaroux Vlârou (Savoyard)
- Commune
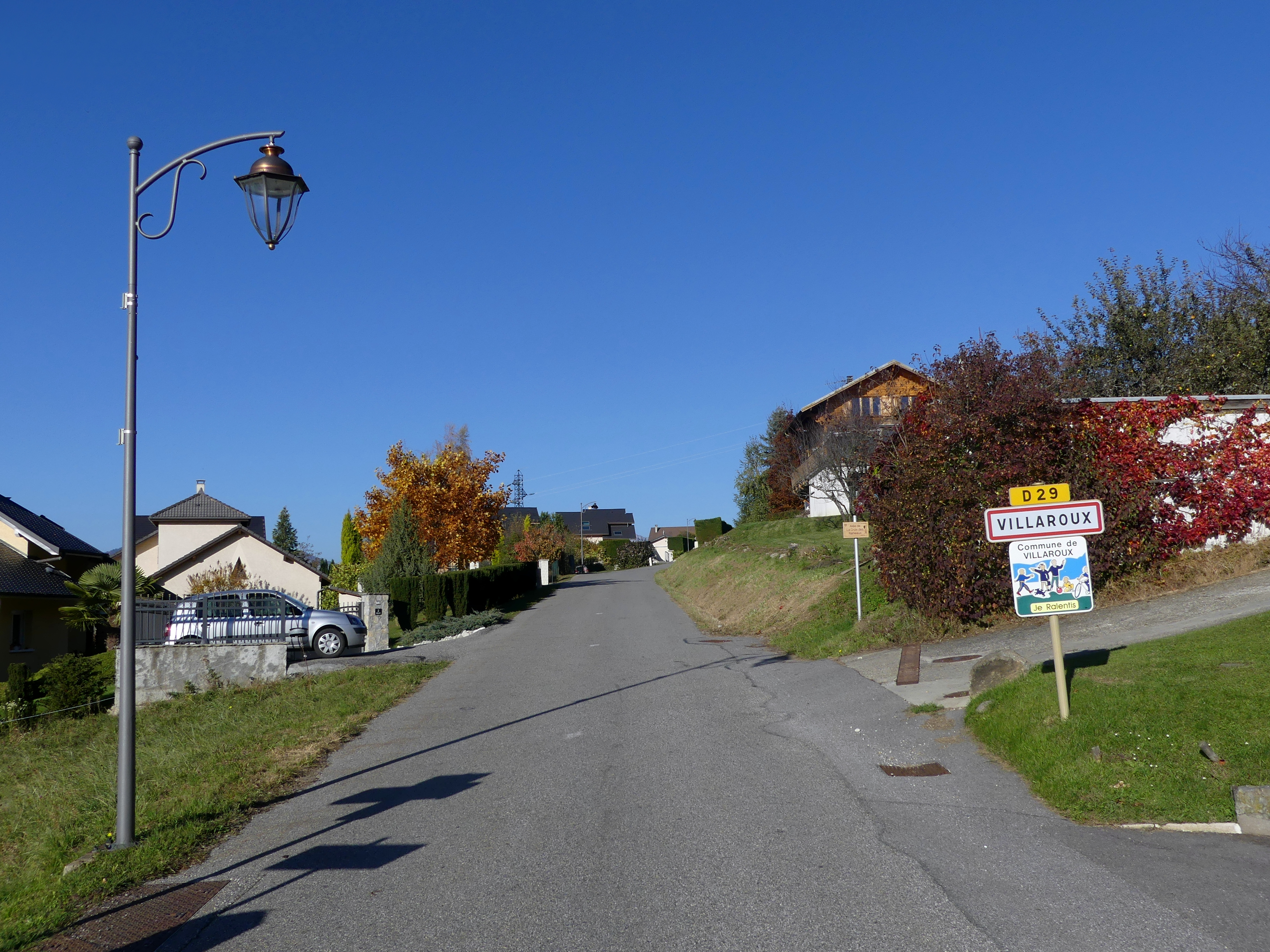
- Location of Villaroux
- Location within France Location within Auvergne-Rhône-Alpes
- Coordinates: 45°27′32″N 6°04′32″E
- Country: France
- Region: Auvergne-Rhône-Alpes
- Department: Savoie
- Arrondissement: Chambéry
- Canton: Montmélian

Government
  - Mayor (2020–2026): Denise Martin
- Area^{1}: 3.09 km^{2} (1.19 sq mi)
- Highest elevation: 809 m (2,654 ft)
- Lowest elevation: 360 m (1,180 ft)
- Population (2023): 192
  - Density: 62.1/km^{2} (161/sq mi)
- Time zone: UTC+01:00 (CET)
  - Summer (DST): UTC+02:00 (CEST)
- INSEE/Postal code: 73324 /73110
- ^{1} French Land Register data, which excludes lakes, ponds, glaciers > 1 km^{2} (0.386 sq mi or 247 acres) and river estuaries.

Villaroux (French pronunciation: [vilaʁu]; Savoyard: Vlârou) is a commune in the Savoie department in the Auvergne-Rhône-Alpes region in south-eastern France.

== See also ==
- Communes of the Savoie department
