= Saint-Jean-de-Couz =

Saint-Jean-de-Couz Sin Jan (Savoyard)
- Commune
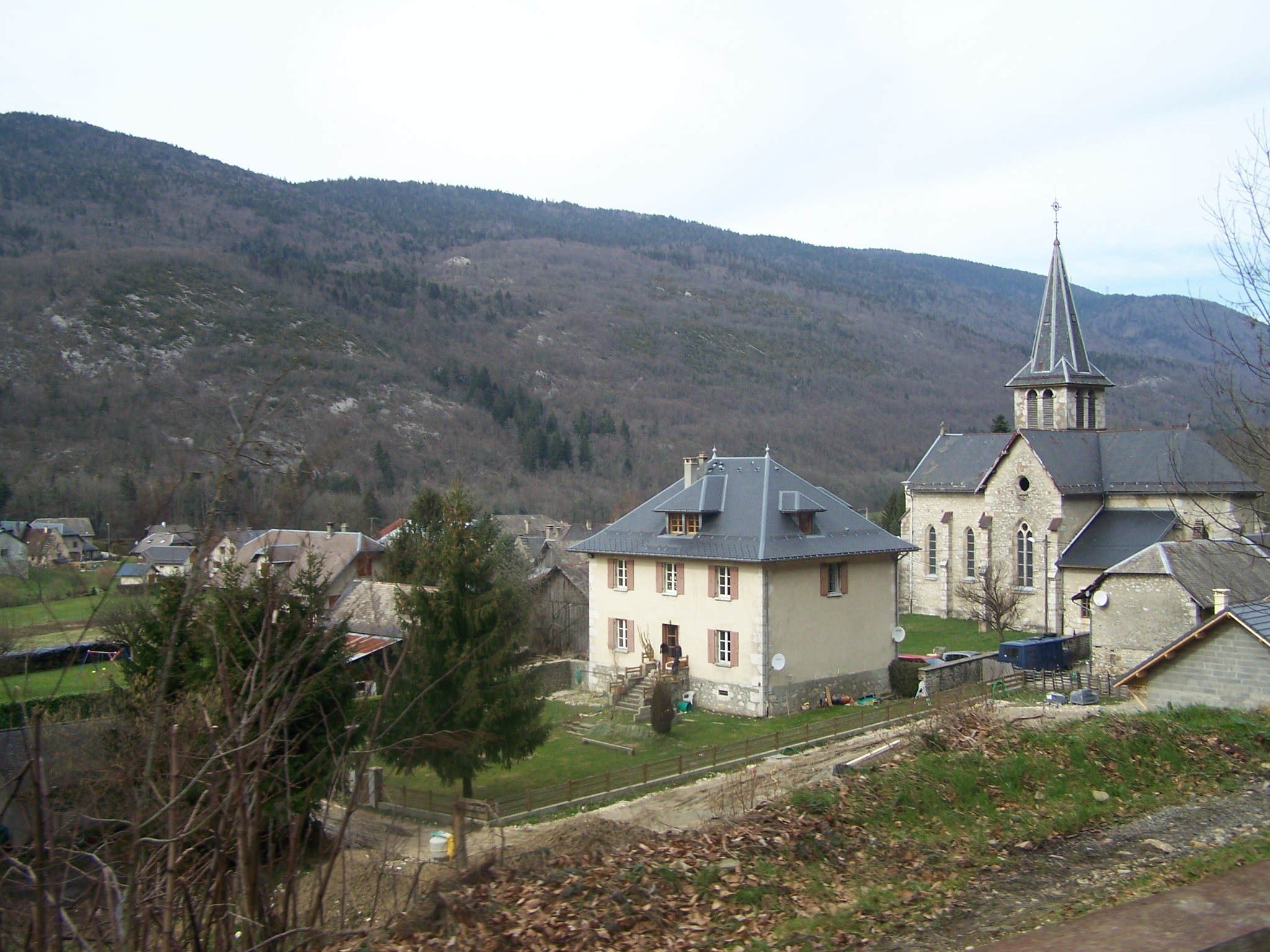
- The church and surrounding buildings in Saint-Jean-de-Couz
- Location of Saint-Jean-de-Couz
- Location within France Location within Auvergne-Rhône-Alpes
- Coordinates: 45°27′59″N 5°49′12″E
- Country: France
- Region: Auvergne-Rhône-Alpes
- Department: Savoie
- Arrondissement: Chambéry
- Canton: Le Pont-de-Beauvoisin
- Intercommunality: CC Cœur de Chartreuse

Government
  - Mayor (2020–2026): Murielle Brun Giraud
- Area^{1}: 7.71 km^{2} (2.98 sq mi)
- Highest elevation: 1,617 m (5,305 ft)
- Lowest elevation: 584 m (1,916 ft)
- Population (2023): 304
  - Density: 39.4/km^{2} (102/sq mi)
- Time zone: UTC+01:00 (CET)
  - Summer (DST): UTC+02:00 (CEST)
- INSEE/Postal code: 73246 /73160
- ^{1} French Land Register data, which excludes lakes, ponds, glaciers > 1 km^{2} (0.386 sq mi or 247 acres) and river estuaries.

Saint-Jean-de-Couz (Savoyard: Sin Jan) is a commune in the Savoie department in the Auvergne-Rhône-Alpes region in south-eastern France.

== Geography ==
Saint-Jean-de-Couz is located at the level of the col de Couz (630m) along the road D1006 which winds through the Couz valley between Saint-Thibaud-de-Couz north and Saint-Christophe-la-Grotte south. The village lies at the junction with the D45 road that climbs the slopes of La Cochette (1,617m), east. The Cochette ridge separates the township to Entremont-le-Vieux.

The township is part of the Parc Naturel Régional de Chartreuse.

The stream of Hyères, which has its source in the col des Égaux on the boundary township of Corbel, flows along the RD45 before following the Couz valley and RD1006 towards Chambéry. The Saint-Jean territory is basically covered with forests, especially of spruces and beeches that forest roads pass through. The most important of them stands on the slopes of Mont Beauvoir (1,319 m), which the ridge line is the boundary with the townships of Saint-Pierre-de-Genebroz and La Bauche.

== History ==
Saint-Jean-de-Couz was an ancient parish was transferred to the Commandery of Les Échelles. In ancient times, a Roman road from Lyon to Milan crossed the territory of the district. It was restored by the princes of Piedmont-Sardinia, and what remains is now known as Sardinian track. A relay station marked the col de Couz for a long time. In the 19th century, a deposit of refractory clay was discovered which was used in the manufacture of bricks. The quarry closed around 1948, and is now flooded and forms a stocked pond for fishing.

During the Second World War, a hotbed of resistance stood against the German occupation, particularly under the leadership of former Mayor Raymond Merle. Available habitat and patriotism of a part of the population allowed the establishment of a command post in the "Wish" lodge. The col du Grapillon also housed clandestine activities.

== Population and society ==
=== Cultural events and festivities ===
The feast of sausage.

=== Media ===
- Local radio: France Bleu Pays de Savoie
- Local TV: France 3 Alpes, TV8 Mont-Blanc

== Sights ==
The town is distinguished by its combination of three main residential hamlets: the town, Replat and Côte Barrier.

The chief town extends along the RD45. It includes:

- The old Cheval Blanc relay, located at col de Couz along the old National Road 6;
- The former bar Relais Paris-Rome-Geneva;
- The old fruit;
- The former sawmill;
- The Saint-Jean-Baptiste Church (19th century), whose windows are the work of a master glassmaker Jean-Marie Pierre Delbecque (1980). The church has been closed to the public since the late 1990s.

The place called The Replat extends around a crossroads, along the Coast Barrier road. There are town hall and the primary school in the same building now newly expanded and the old Denat coffee.

Two subdivisions were built in the chief place:

- Le Grand Pré, at the entrance to the town;
- The Amecoule, below the Replat on the Coast Barrier road.

At the Replat, two communal roads lead to the two hamlets. North, "Heirs" include some houses. Côte Barrier is located below, one kilometer south. There are the old quarry of particular clay and stones as well as ruins of the ancient furnace.

== See also ==
- Communes of the Savoie department
