= Corbel, Savoie =

Corbel
- Commune
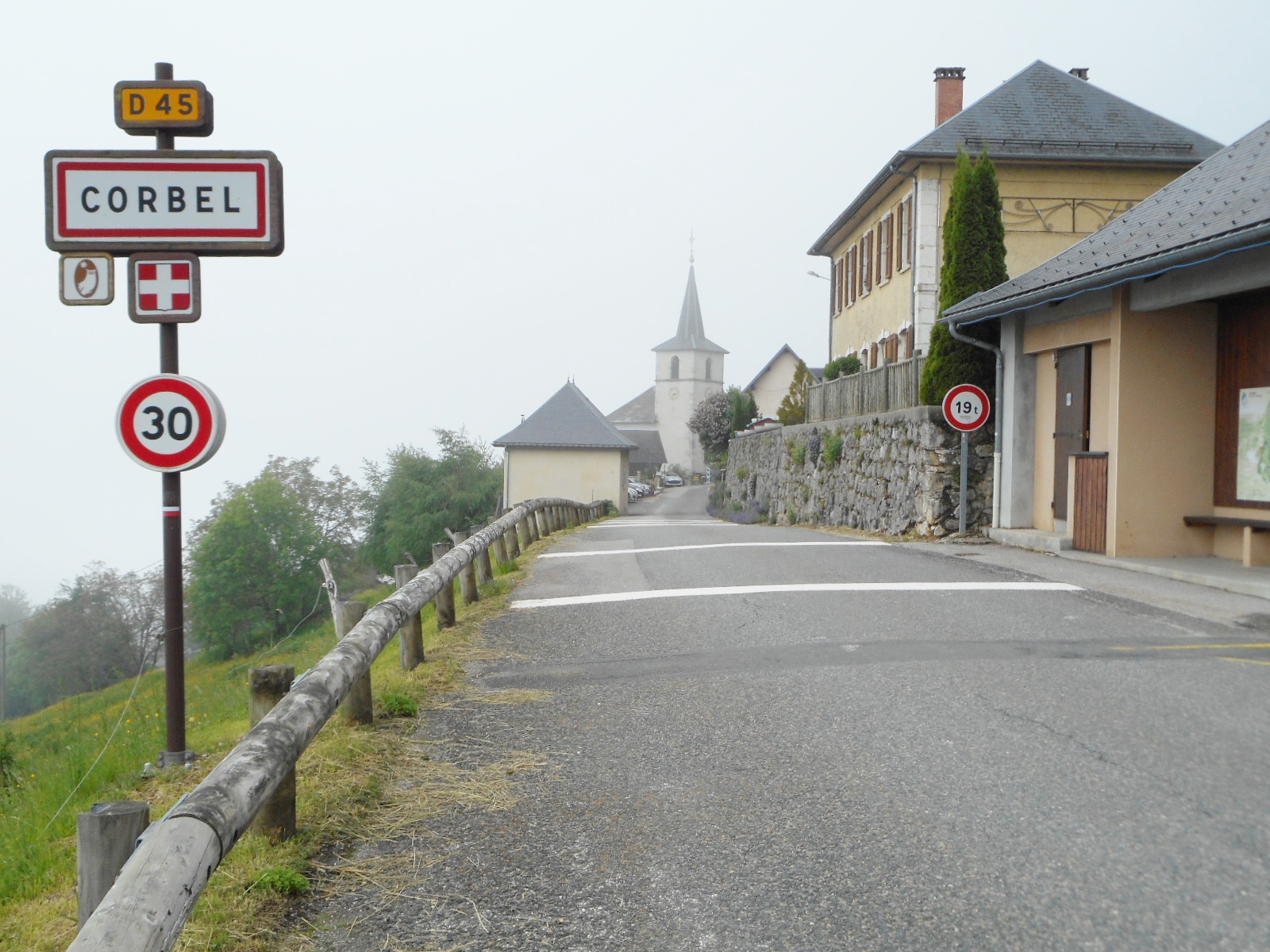
- Corbel entrance
- Location of Corbel
- Location within France Location within Auvergne-Rhône-Alpes
- Coordinates: 45°25′49″N 5°49′34″E
- Country: France
- Region: Auvergne-Rhône-Alpes
- Department: Savoie
- Arrondissement: Chambéry
- Canton: Le Pont-de-Beauvoisin
- Intercommunality: CC Cœur de Chartreuse

Government
  - Mayor (2026–32): Michel Valette
- Area^{1}: 10.31 km^{2} (3.98 sq mi)
- Highest elevation: 1,617 m (5,305 ft)
- Lowest elevation: 480 m (1,570 ft)
- Population (2023): 161
  - Density: 15.6/km^{2} (40.4/sq mi)
- Time zone: UTC+01:00 (CET)
  - Summer (DST): UTC+02:00 (CEST)
- INSEE/Postal code: 73092 /73160
- ^{1} French Land Register data, which excludes lakes, ponds, glaciers > 1 km^{2} (0.386 sq mi or 247 acres) and river estuaries.

Corbel (French pronunciation: [kɔʁbɛl]; Arpitan: Korbé) is a commune in the Savoie department in the Auvergne-Rhône-Alpes region in south-eastern France. It borders the department of Isère.

== Geography ==
The township of Corbel has three main water streams: Gringalet, Hyères and Guiers Vif. The Gringalet separates the Corbel Valley from north to south and Guiers Vif runs along its southern border, in the Gorges du Guiers Vif. The Gringalet rises in the township, close to Les Cruz, and empties into the Guiers Vif. Hyères (or Hyère), meanwhile, has its source at the Col des Égaux and runs down to the township of Saint-Jean-de-Couz. The Corbel Valley is more forested and steepest at the southern border, and less so in the center and at the north. In the Col des Égaux, there are more grasslands and flat surfaces. Two of the Chartreuse Mountains are located in the territory of the township: Roche Veyrand (1356 m) and Thivelet (1231m). Northeast of the town is La Cluse, which leads to the Col de la Cluse via the D45.

The town of Corbel (845 m), the center of the township, is located on the east side of Thivelet (or Thimelet), and is about 20 km from Chambéry, by the D45 and the D1006 roads. Between Roche Veyrand and Thivelet lies the hamlet of Les Fiolins (860m). Further north of the township are the hamlets of Les Mathés (900m) and of Les Cruz (1000 m). The Morel and La Cochette subdivisions are located below the mountain named La Cochette, and near the hamlets of Les Burneys and Les Perrucons. On the other side of the slope of Le Thimelet mountain range lies the village of Egaux, near the Col des Égaux. From the Col des Égaux, there is a continuous descent of about 5 km from the RD 45 to Saint-Jean-de-Couz. The southern border of the township, bounded by the Guiers Vif, is borders the department of Isère.

== History ==
In the eighteenth century, the township experienced a huge growth of population. The population grew up from 260 inhabitants in 1755 to 555 inhabitants in 1801. The township of Corbel became part of the township of Saint-Thibaud-de-Couz during the French Revolution, and later, that of Les Échelles. In the nineteenth century, the township was relatively poor and populated (580 inhabitants in 1848). Famine often threatened Corbelains (inhabitants) because the earth only allowed them to grow oats and potatoes. The main resource of the township was trade, including the export of timber to Les Échelles and Chambéry. From 1850, with the creation of the main road to Chambéry (D45), the township was depopulated, and saw its population halved in less than fifty years. With these new roads, famine and poverty have gradually disappeared from the township. In the twentieth century, the wealth of the township and the standard of living of the population increased progressively. In 1994 a small road was created, reserved for the residents, that directly connects Saint-Pierre-d'Entremont in Savoie to Corbel.

== Population and society ==
=== Cultural events and festivities ===
Church and trails, ovens and fountains. Hiking on the trail to see the ovens and fountains of Corbel.

=== Sports ===
Many sports activities can be practiced in the township. Trails have been marked for tourists. There is cycling, climbing, horse riding, gliding and canoeing in the Gorges du Guiers Vif. The Fiolins hamlet is the starting point of a path that leads to a via ferrata through Roche Veyrand to get to Saint-Pierre-d'Entremont in Savoie.

Corbel is near skiing and tobogganing stations such as Le Desert d'Entremont. There are also snowshoe paths that connect Corbel to the winter sports resort of the Desert, but with a variety of loops in the township.

=== Media ===
- Local TV: France 3 Alpes, TV8 Mont-Blanc
- Local radio: France Bleu Pays de Savoie

=== Personalities ===
- Arcabas (1926) - Painter and sculptor, he is one of the authors of contemporary sacred art in France.

== Sights ==
=== Ovens and fountains ===
In the town, some basins (fountains) cut in the stone are very famous. Int of the basins of the township were renovated. Ovens of different hamlets are also significant and have their specificities. The walking tour "ovens and fountains" was created specially to visit most of the ovens and fountains of the township.

=== Other notable sights ===
- The views over the Chartreuse are countless on the heights of Corbel, especially the Ruchère, the Grand Som or the Crête des Eparres.
- The church of Corbel dates from the thirteenth century, but it was renovated in the eighteenth century. It is the oldest church of the Entremonts. It features Arcabas's stained glasses from the twentieth century (1997).
- A mill from the sixteenth century is on the road between Les Fiolins and Les Perrucons.

== See also ==
- Communes of the Savoie department
