= Château des ducs de Savoie =

Fortified castle

Coordinates: 45°33′52″N 5°55′04″E

- Château de Chambéry
- Chambéry, Savoie, France
- The medieval north front of the château

Site information
- Type: Castle
- Owner: Berlion family

Site history
- Built: 11th century

The Château des ducs de Savoie, or Château de Chambéry, is a fortified castle dating from the 11th century. It is located in the French commune of Chambéry in the Savoie department of the Auvergne-Rhône-Alpes region.

Modified several times since the 13th century, it has retained its administrative vocation ever since. From 1502 to 1578, the castle chapel housed the Holy Shroud. The bell tower now houses the 70-bell "Saint-François de Sales" carillon, the work of the Paccard foundry in Sévrier. A concert is held every first and third Saturday of the month at 11 am.

Today, the château houses the Savoie Prefecture, the Savoie Departmental Council, and the Savoie Academy.

Listed as a historic monument: the former Château des Ducs de Savoie was listed by decree on August 10, 1881; the grand salon with its Louis XVI decor was listed by decree on April 20, 1960.

== Location ==
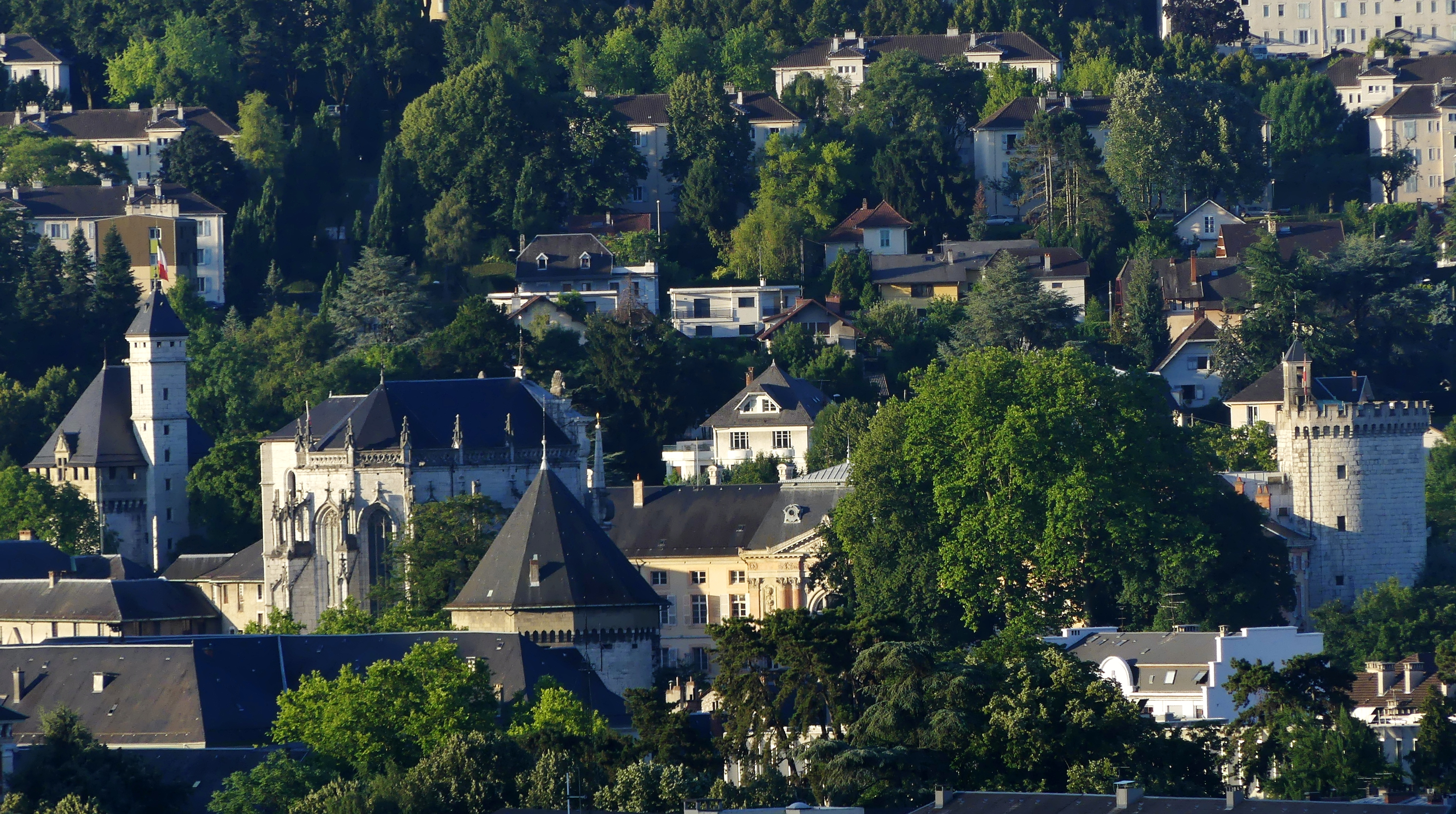
The château at the foot of Bellevue.

The former Château des Ducs de Savoie is located in the French department of Savoie, in the commune of Chambéry. The château was originally built on a terrace (butte, or poype) facing the town at the end of the Montjay hill. Sloping gently to the southeast, it was then raised to give the château a more commanding position over the town. At its foot was a branch of the Albanne River.

Today, the Albanne has been diverted into the Leysse upstream of the town center, where it no longer flows. The nearest river to the château is the Leysse, some 500 m to the north. At the foot of the castle are the Place du Château and the Faubourg Maché, which, together with the hospital, mitigates the presence of the Montjay hill near the castle. Still dominant and facing Chambéry's old town and city center, the château is now also dominated by the Bellevue district on the first slopes of the Chartreuse Massif.

== History ==
The site occupied by the château was an important crossroads and strategic point, controlling since ancient times the ancient Roman road from Vienne to Italy via the Petit-Saint-Bernard pass and the Mont-Cenis pass, as well as later: the roads from Lyon and Vienne via Les Échelles; the road from Lyon via the Col de l'Épine and the Col du Chat; the road from Geneva via Rumilly and Annecy; the road from Grenoble via the Isère valley and the Col du Granier.

The château is believed to have been built in the 11th century by the lords of Chambéry, near the site of the ancient Roman city of Lemencum.

=== Before 1563: seat of the House of Savoie ===
On March 15, 1232, Count Thomas I of Savoie acquired part of the town from Viscount Berlion de Chambéry, lord of Chambéry, in exchange for the fiefdom of Montfort and 32,000 sous forts de Suse. The town has been known since 1057. Four members of the de La Forest family, Thorens, Berlion, Sigomon, and Martin, witnessed the transaction. Viscount Berlion kept the castle, which he sold some time later to Otmar Alamand. On May 6, 1255, Thomas II of Piedmont acquired the castle of Chambéry from Alamand as a pledge, and the latter paid him 626 livres, 9 sous bons viennois to settle his debts. In 1259, the castle passed to his widow Beatrice Fieschi, who relinquished her rights in 1264 to Count Pierre II of Savoie, her brother-in-law.

On February 6, 1295, Amédée V of Savoie acquired the castle of Chambéry, its mandement and its viscounty, jurisdiction, vassals, and fiefs from François de La Rochette, lord of Chambéry, and his wife Béatrix, in exchange for 240 Viennois pounds and 100 pounds of revenue in the mandements of Aiguebelle and La Rochette. The Counts of Savoie made it their principal residence. The château now centralized the "administrative functions of the entire county", to the detriment of Montmélian, which retained an important military function, notably with the increase in its garrison.

Amédée V of Savoie undertook major fortification work and residential improvements to accommodate the administration of the States of Savoie and court life, a function the château would retain until 1562, when Emmanuel-Philibert of Savoie moved the center of his States' administration to Turin. There, he moved the Chambre des Comptes, which until then had been itinerant and had been tested by Pierre de Savoie in Faucigny before 1260, to a new building in the Château de Chambéry, which he had recently acquired.

At the end of the thirteenth century, considerable work was undertaken to raise the height of the fortified mound, construct the porter's house and, in the course of the fourteenth and fifteenth centuries, the buildings around today's main courtyard.

On September 16, 1383, the baptism of the future Amédée VIII of Savoie took place in the great hall, decorated in the early 14th century with frescoes by Hugonin Frénier, Maître Jacques and Jean de Grandson. It is assumed that this room was located in the "Vieux Pavillon". In 1365, Charles IV of the Holy Roman Empire had stayed in a room known as the "Emperor's Room".

Bonne de Bourbon, around 1394, built the Chambre des Comptes, the Governor's building. It was at this time that the walls were pierced for the first time with ogival windows, the premise of Gothic art. A three-storey high round tower, designed by Mason François Matelli, was erected between 1395 and 1400.

Defensive towers were also built: the Grande Tour, no longer in existence, the Tour Trésorerie in the 14th and 15th centuries, the Tour demi-ronde in 1398, and the Tour du Carrefour or Tour des Archives in 1439.

In 1408, Count Amédée VIII of Savoie decided to build a new chapel in the flamboyant Gothic style, following plans by Nicolas Robert, an architect from Chambéry. Completed in 1430, the chapel housed the Holy Shroud from 1502 to 1578. In 1466, it was cited in a papal bull as the Sainte-Chapelle du Saint Suaire. In the same year, under the aegis of architect Blaise Neyrand, Yolande de France had the bell tower built. It was in this bell tower, or "Yolande Tower", that the Grand Carillon was installed.

In 1416, to mark the erection of Savoie as a duchy, Amédée VIII had a famous meal served there in honor of Emperor Sigismund. On this occasion, he served a cake depicting his states; this is the origin of the "Savoie cake". Bayard was a page for Charles III in the early 16th century. In 1532, a fire seriously damaged the château.

The castle became home to the prince's itinerant court, and thus the "Hôtel de Savoie". While retaining its role as a fortress, it also served as the administrative headquarters for the Treasury of Charters, the Resident Council, the Chamber of Accounts, and the Chancellery.

=== From 1563 to 1860: administrative building of the States of Savoie ===
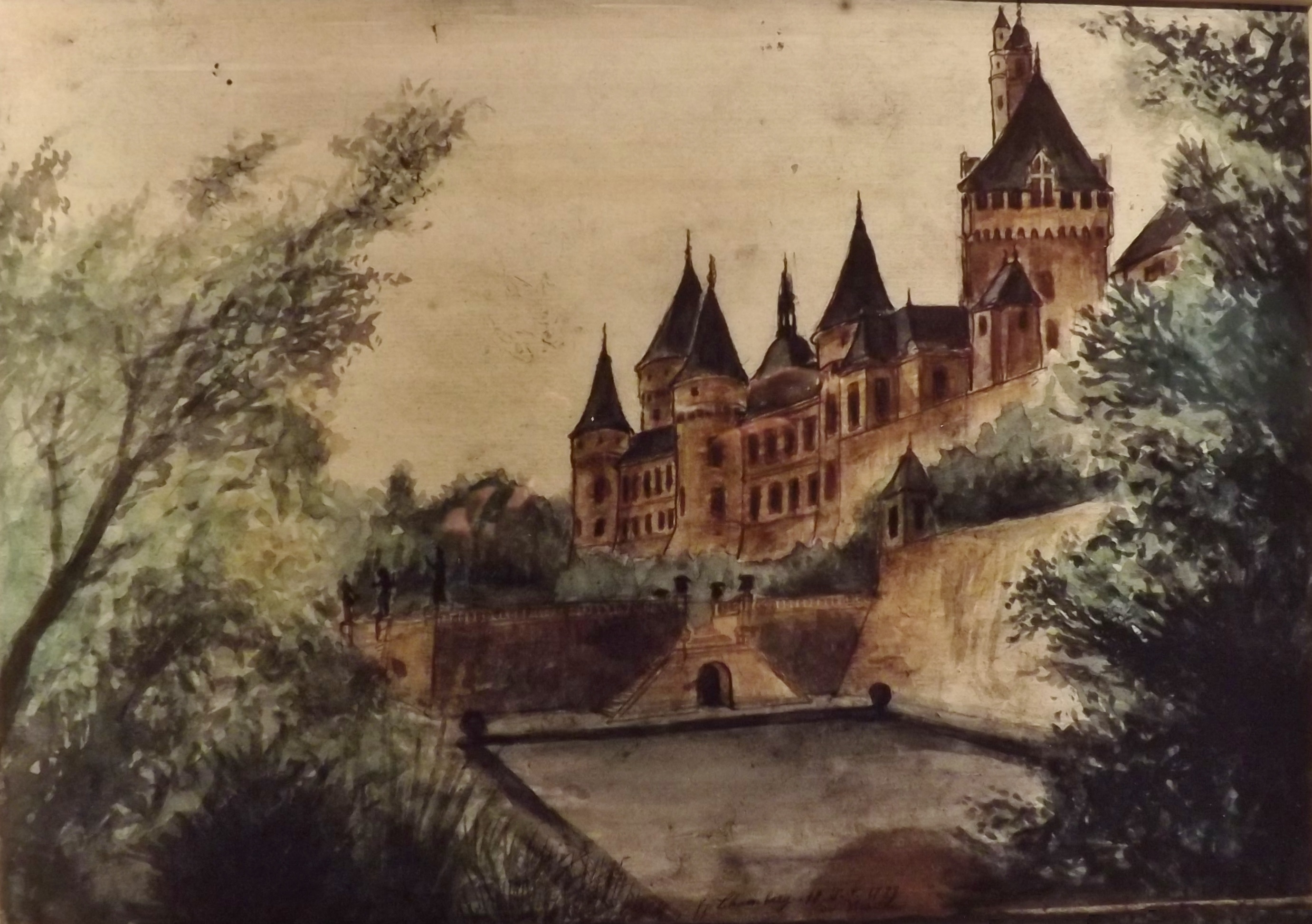
Château de Chambéry in 1788.

After the capital of the States of Savoie was transferred from Chambéry to Turin in 1563, the château remained a ducal residence and administrative headquarters. It housed the Chambre des Comptes, the Government of Savoie, and the Intendance Générale.

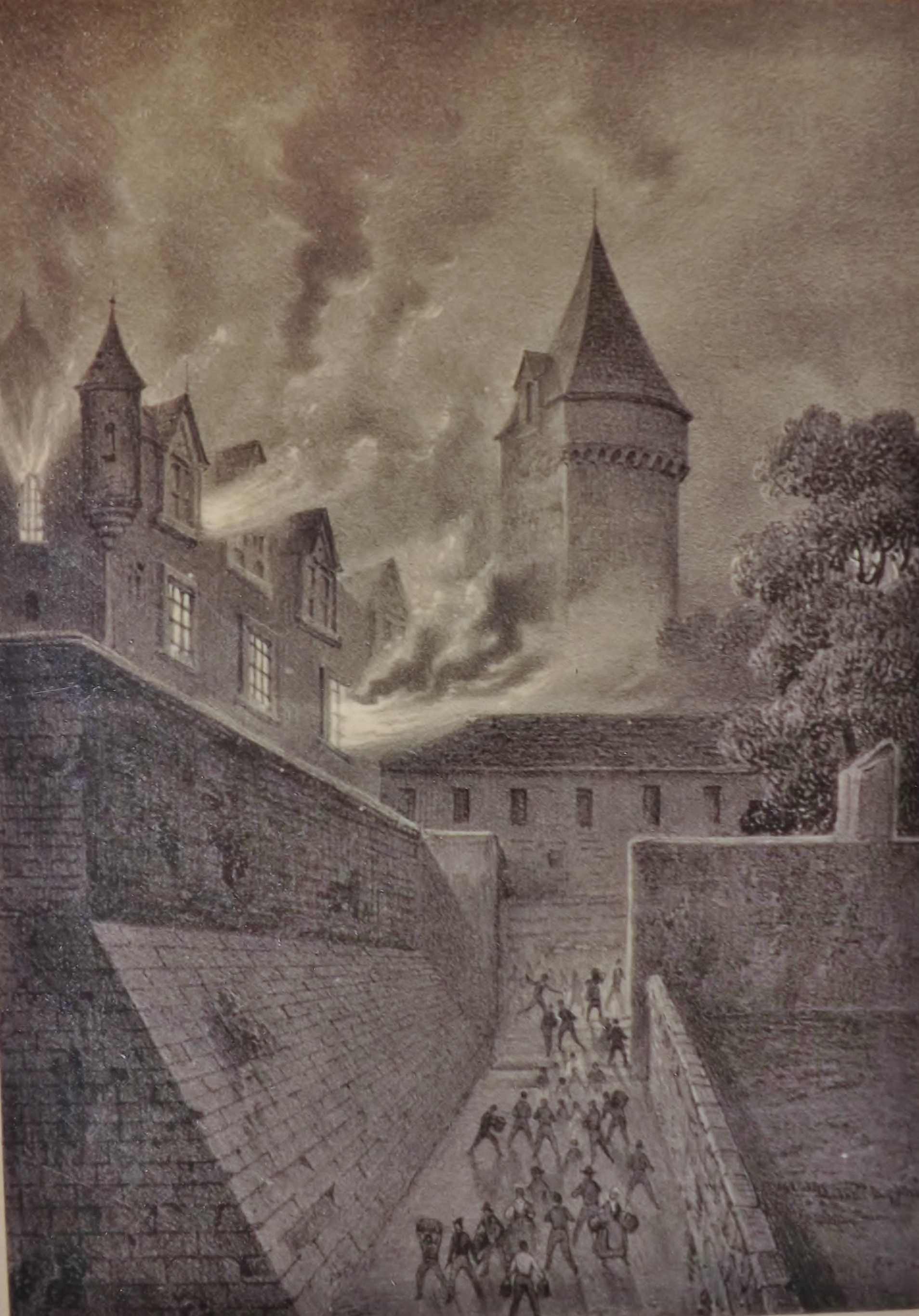
The fire of 1743.

During the Franco-Savoyard war, which led to the 2nd French occupation of Savoie, the citadel of Chambéry capitulated on August 24, 1600. On August 21, 1600, the city opened its gates to the troops of King Henri IV of France. Count Chabod de Jacob, governor of Savoie, and the bourgeois took refuge with the garrison in the citadel. When the king ordered an 8-gun battery to be placed in front of the citadel, the castle's defenders took fright at this show of force and surrendered. The citadel was not handed over to the King of France until 8 days later. The surrender agreement stipulated that "if within this 8-day period, the Duke came to the rescue with an army, the capitulation would not take place".

In the early 17th century, Governor Dom Félix de Savoie had the Pavillon laid out on the site of the garden adjoining the Tour Trésorerie and the grand parterre; then, from 1655 to 1663, Duchess Christine de France had Amedeo di Castellamonte rebuild the façade of the Sainte-Chapelle in Baroque style.

Victor-Amédée II of Savoie, after abdicating in favor of his son in 1730, retired with his wife, Anna Canalis di Cumianala, Marquise de Spigno, to the Château de Chambéry. He left the château in 1731, intending to regain power from his son.

Jean-Jacques Rousseau worked in the land registry office from 1732 to 1734 during his stay in Chambéry. In his "Confessions", he complained about his work, describing it as "sullen" and the office as "sad and stuffy".

The château was twice burnt down in the 18th century, notably during the Spanish occupation in 1743, during the War of the Austrian Succession, when fire destroyed part of the royal apartments.

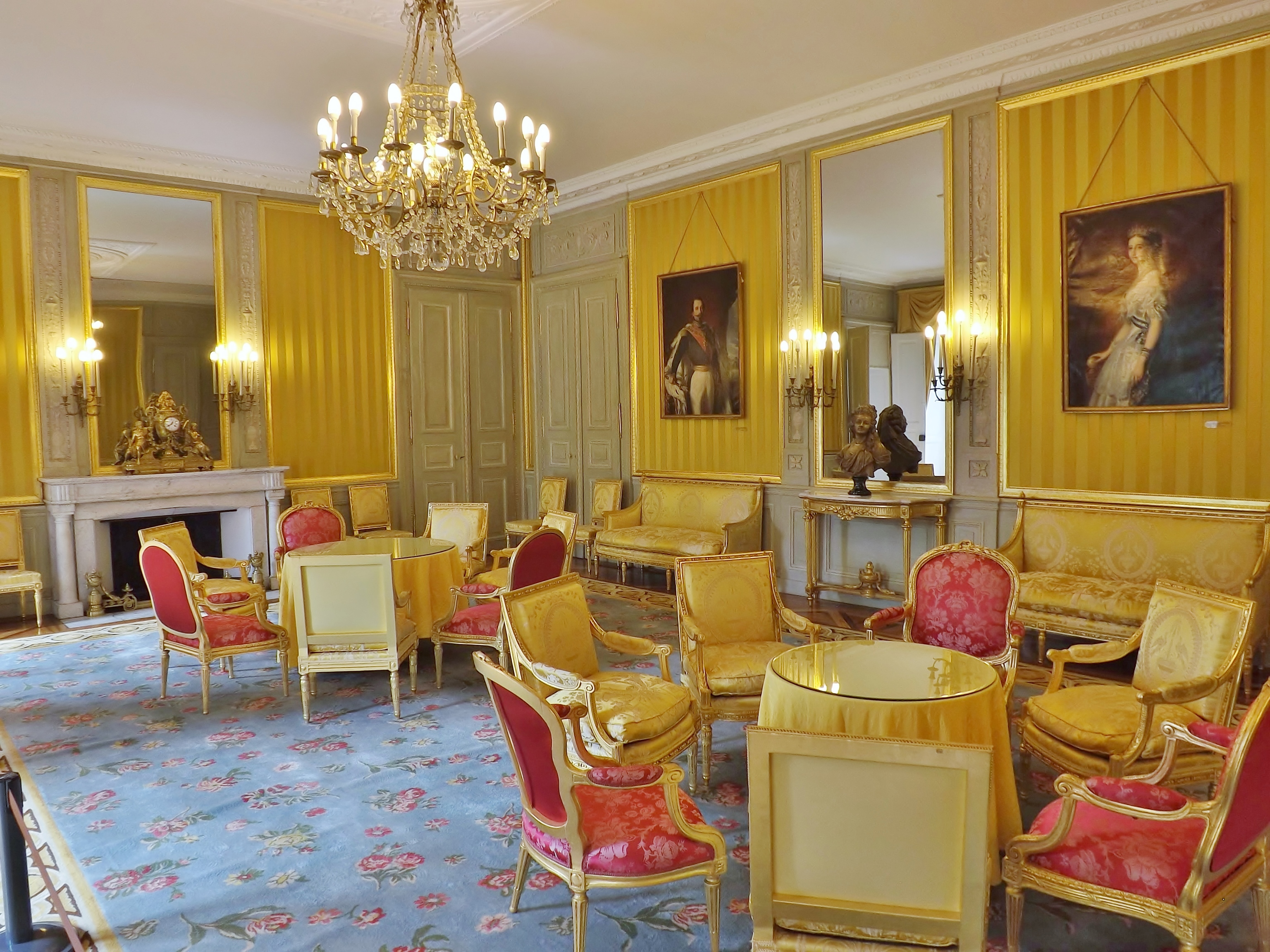
Salon jaune, in the Aile du Midi.

Although reconstruction projects were envisaged, they failed for lack of funds. It wasn't until 1775, with the marriage of the future King Charles-Emmanuel IV of Sardinia to Louis XVI's sister, that work began on extending the château towards the Pavillon and building a monumental staircase, by the architect Piacenza.

A new royal wing was built in 1786 but was damaged in 1798 by a mysterious fire that destroyed the Pavillon. On the night of February 23 to 24, 1798, the château was partly destroyed by fire, taking with it all documents relating to the sale of national property, with the exception of those concerning the districts of Chambéry and Carouge. All that remained of the 1792 “Château National” were the royal wing and the isolated half-round tower opposite the Sainte-Chapelle and the medieval building. It was then abandoned.

From 1800 onwards, the first prefects began restoration work. In 1802, the château was assigned to the Prefecture and the General Council of the Mont-Blanc department.

Napoleon I, visiting Chambéry in 1805, commissioned two reconstruction projects. The one he chose transformed the royal wing into an imperial apartment. After the Treaty of Paris in 1815 and the return of the Mont-Blanc department to the Kingdom of Sardinia in 1816, the château once again housed the court. In 1820, King Charles-Félix of Sardinia had the Sainte-Chapelle renovated. In 1836, King Charles-Albert of Sardinia had it decorated with trompe-l'œil paintings by Casimir Vicario.

In 1844, the king made part of the château gardens and the gardener's house, now the museum, available to the Société d'histoire naturelle de la Savoie. King Victor-Emmanuel II of Savoie went on to rebuild the main building. Work began in 1850 under the direction of the king's architect, Ernest Mélano, and was completed during the Third Republic.

=== Since 1860: a French administrative building ===
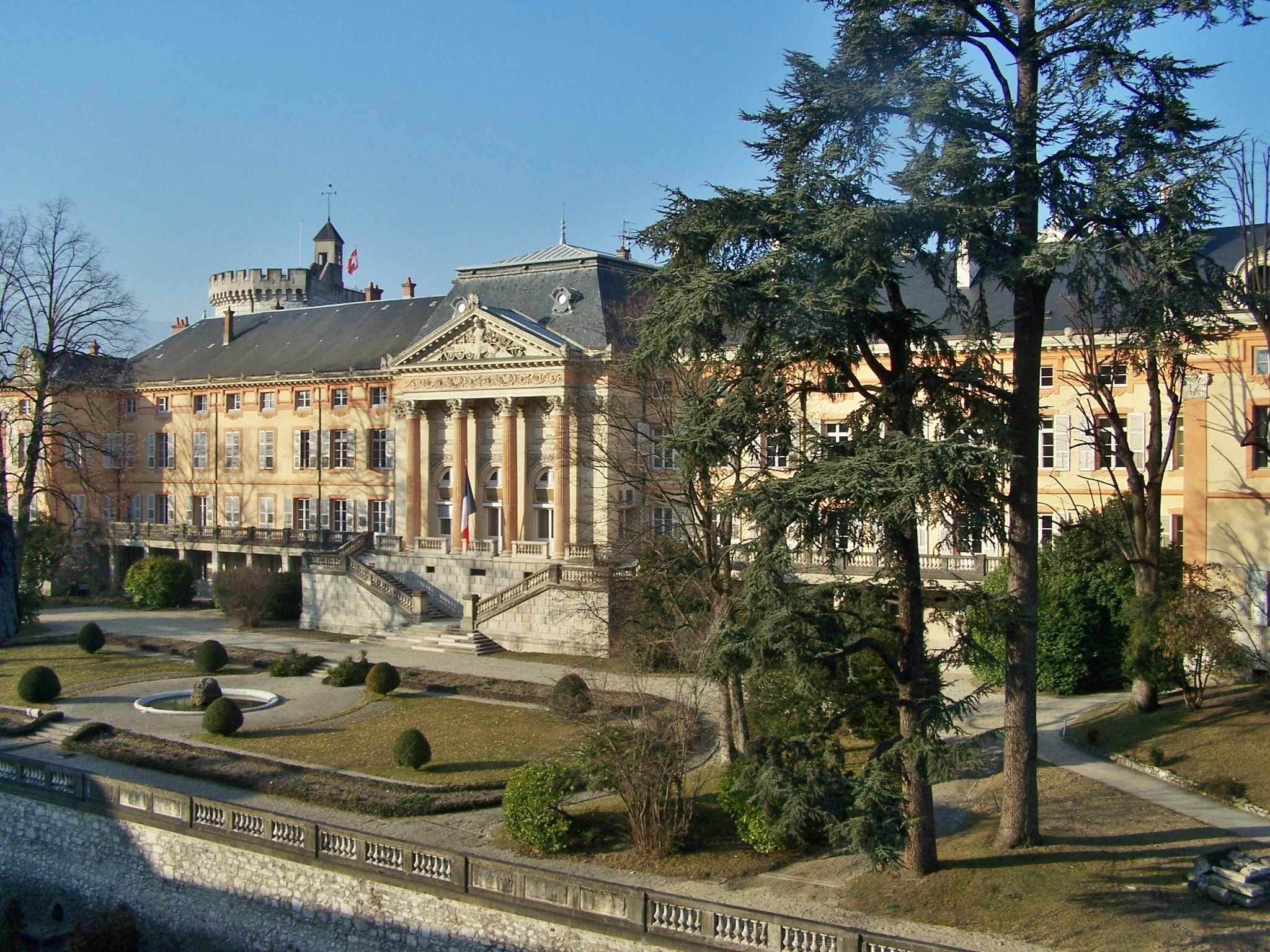
From inside the courtyard: in the center, the private apartments; on the right, the Savoie departmental council; on the left, the Savoie prefecture.

When the château was annexed to France in 1860, it was "conceded free of charge and in full ownership to the Savoie department", and Napoleon III entrusted the architects Dénarié and Duban with the task. A new wing was built and the half-round tower was fitted with a monumental staircase.

The château was restored in the late 19th century. The decorations in the Sainte-Chapelle were restored between 2009 and 2012.

Since 1890, the Château des Ducs de Savoie has housed the Savoie Prefecture, the Savoie Departmental Council, and the Savoie Academy. On November 1, 1997, another fire ravaged the attic and top floor of the east wing.

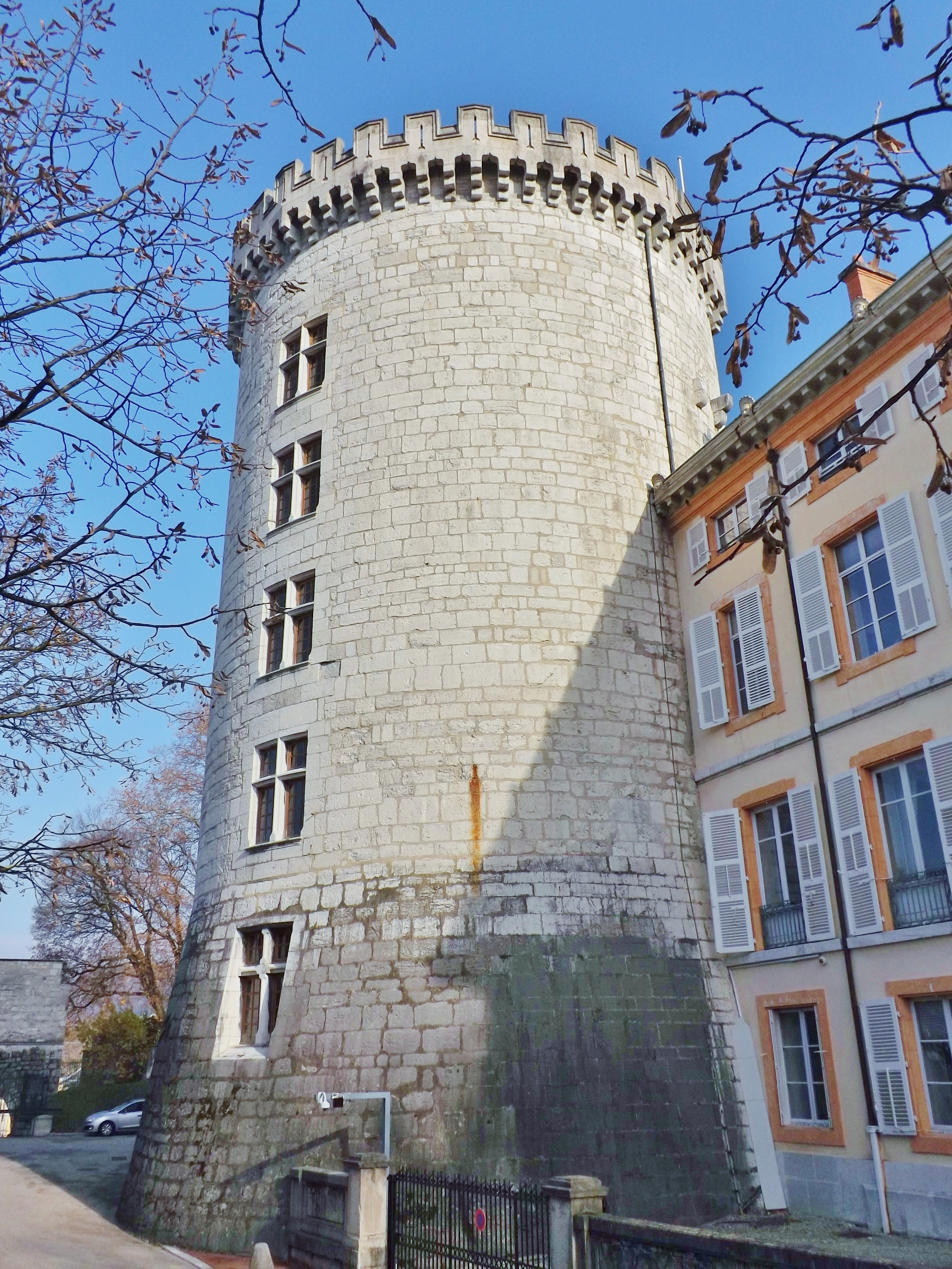
The castle's 14th-century half-round tower.

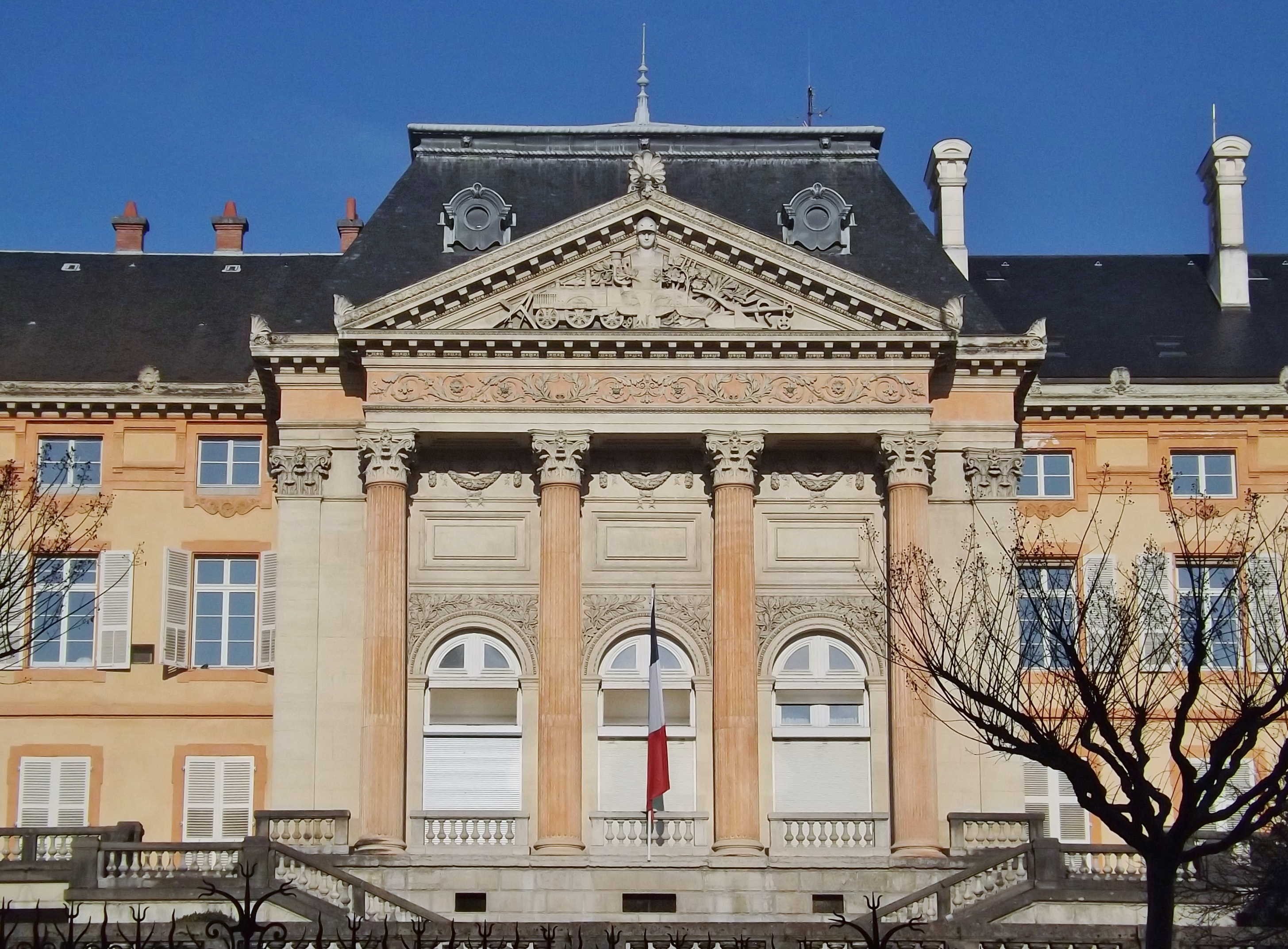
Center of the Napoleon III façade.

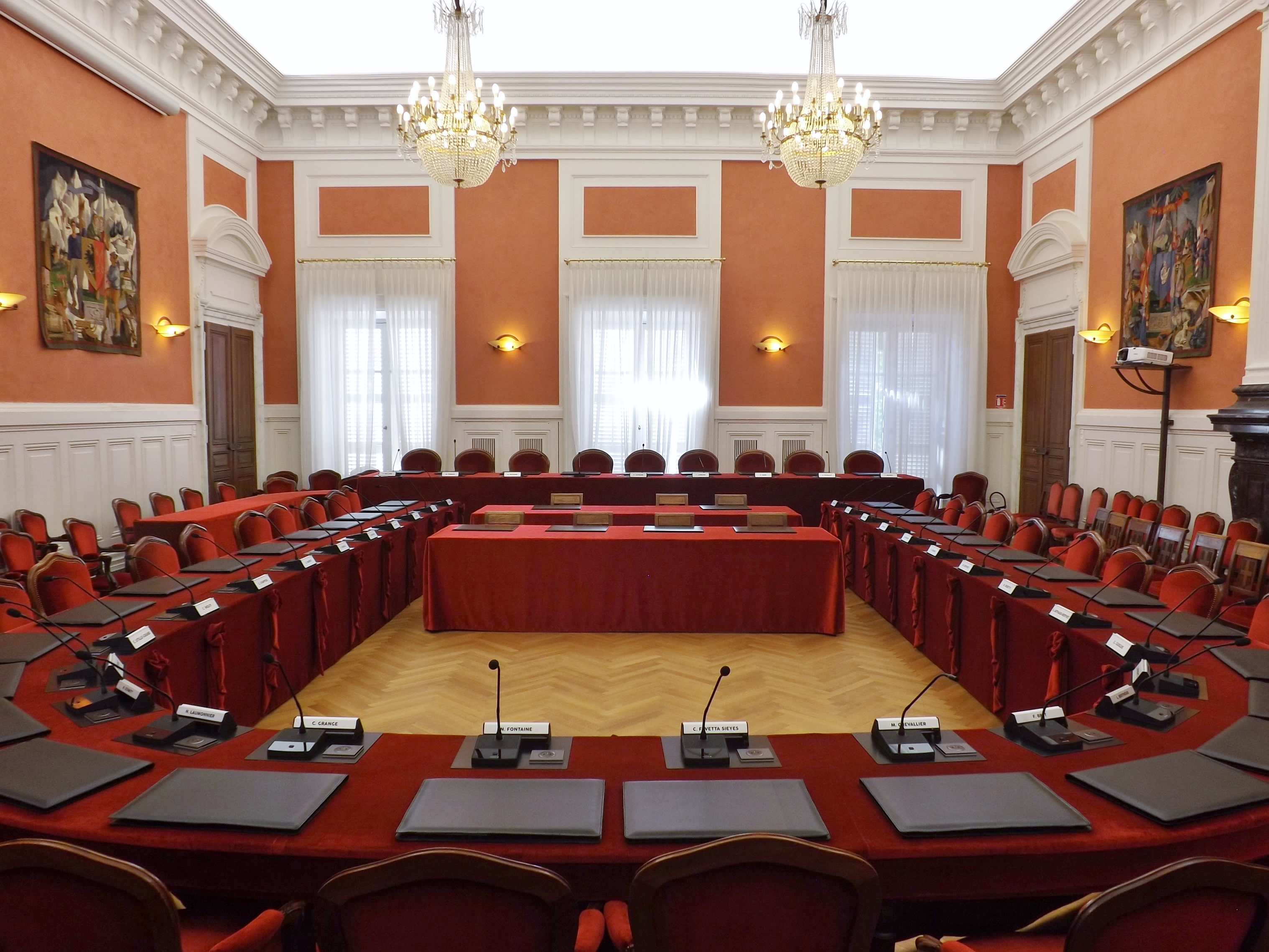
Salle des délibérations du conseil départemental de la Savoie.

== Description ==
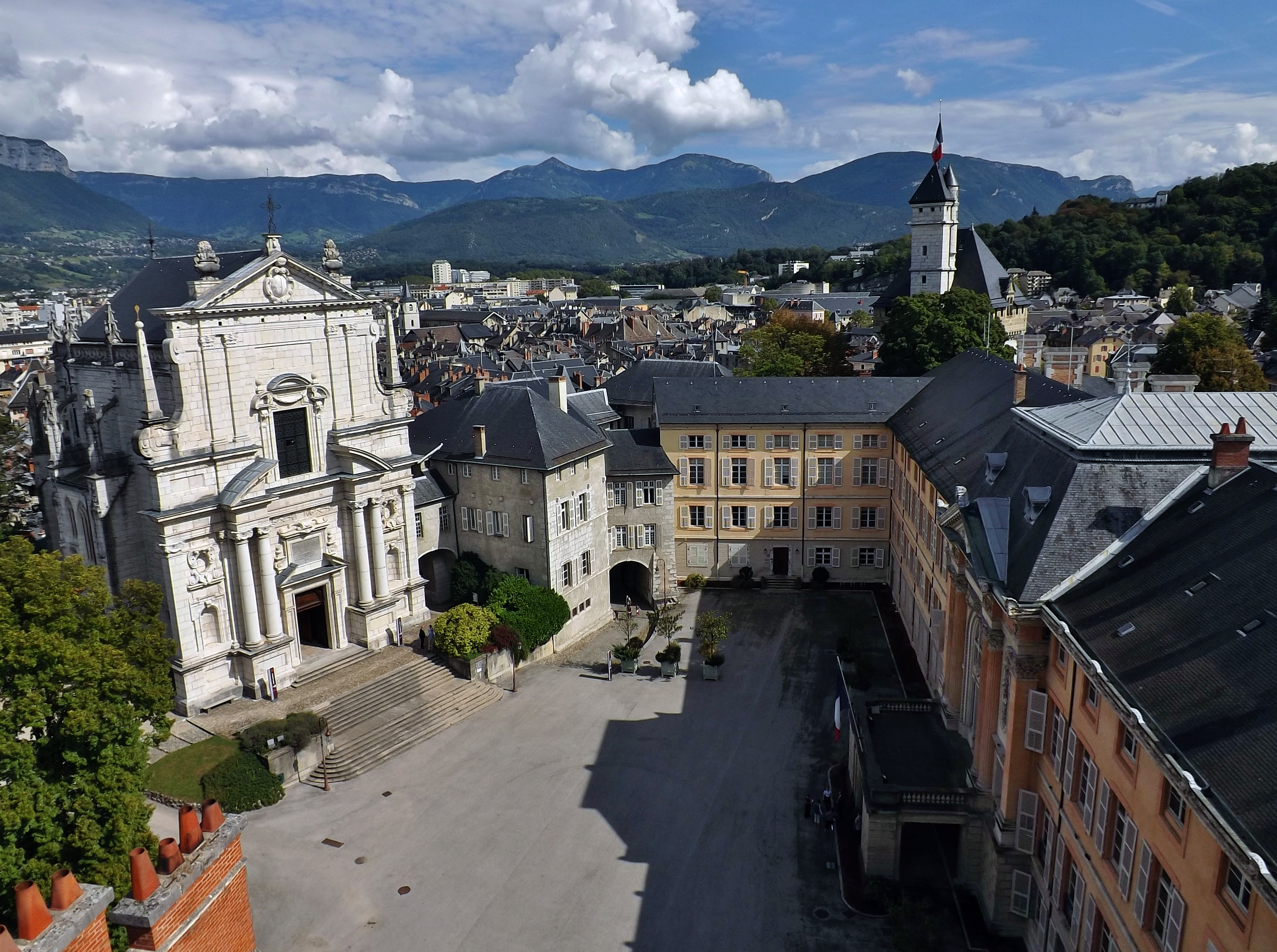
General view of the château courtyard from the half-round tower; on the left is the Sainte-Chapelle, and on the right is the Midi wing.

Chambéry castle takes the form of an irregular quadrilateral, with a square keep flanked by a turret-guette, a tall, semi-circular tower, and a high chapel.

The original château of the Sires de Chambéry, which stood at the end of a mound protected by marshes to the east and north and by a branch of the Albanne river, probably stood on a motte, as the 14th-century designation of "Mollard de la Poype" suggests. A high platform remains to the east of the enclosure, possibly a vestige of the original earthworks. This primitive building was considerably modified and enlarged from the end of the 13th century. Most of the surviving buildings date from the 14th and 15th centuries. The seigniorial dwelling occupied the south wing.

Initial access to the château was via a gateway to the west, protected by the Tour des Poudres (Powder Tower), which Amédée V rebuilt, and a new tower he erected, the Tour aux Armes. Lord Berlion's château, acquired in 1295, was greatly enlarged and strengthened under Amédée V. He built the Tour des Édits de la Chambre on the same side, with a new building linking it to the Tour aux Armes. The main entrance was moved to the northeast.

Access to the château was via a ramp, to the right of the present staircase, erected in 1850 and remodeled in 1899 when the statue of the de Maistre brothers was installed, which led to a terrace opposite the gatehouse. This terrace was defended by a turret and a wall on the left. A drawbridge, no longer in existence, allowed access across the moat in front of the gate.

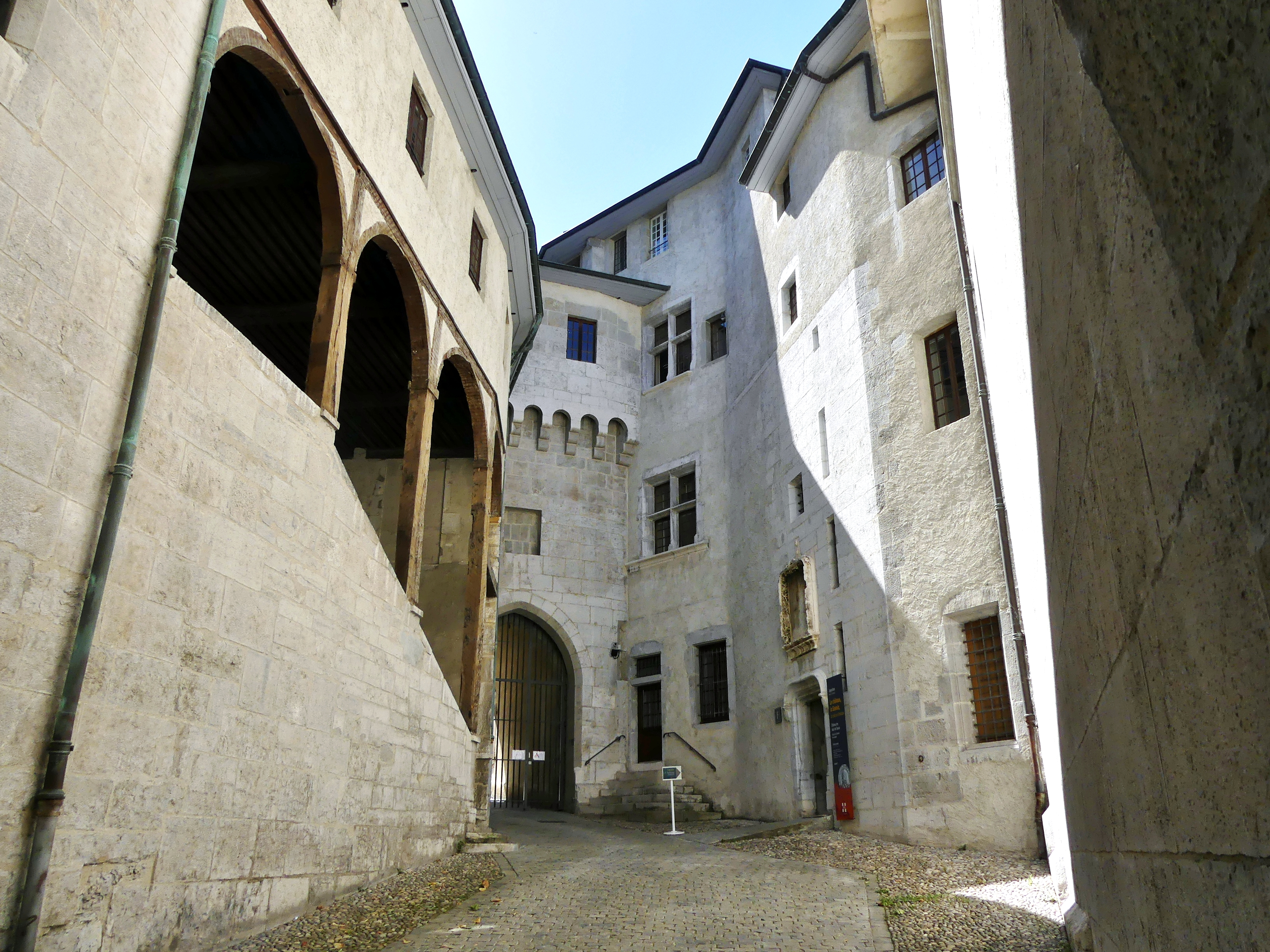
Passage de la porterie.

=== Parts of the château ===
==== The gatehouse ====
Built between 1318 and 1330, the gateway was paved in the early 14th century and vaulted in 1850.

The lower part of the passage features a massive, high, rectangular, late-15th-century gate tower, under the dominion of the Tour des Archives. The passageway is bordered on the right by the Government building, to which is attached the Intendance building, which served as the office of the Intendant Général in the 18th century, in charge of the duchy's administration, and on the left by the Prince's apartment, under which it passes under the protection of the machicolations that dominate it, and narrows at the Porte de la Herse, dated 1302–1303, which we owe to Amédée V. As its name suggests, this gate was fitted with a portcullis, operated from the parapet walk, of which two grooves remain.

==== The Princes' building ====
This 14th-century building has borne this name since the 18th century when it served as the residence of one of Victor-Amédée II's sons.

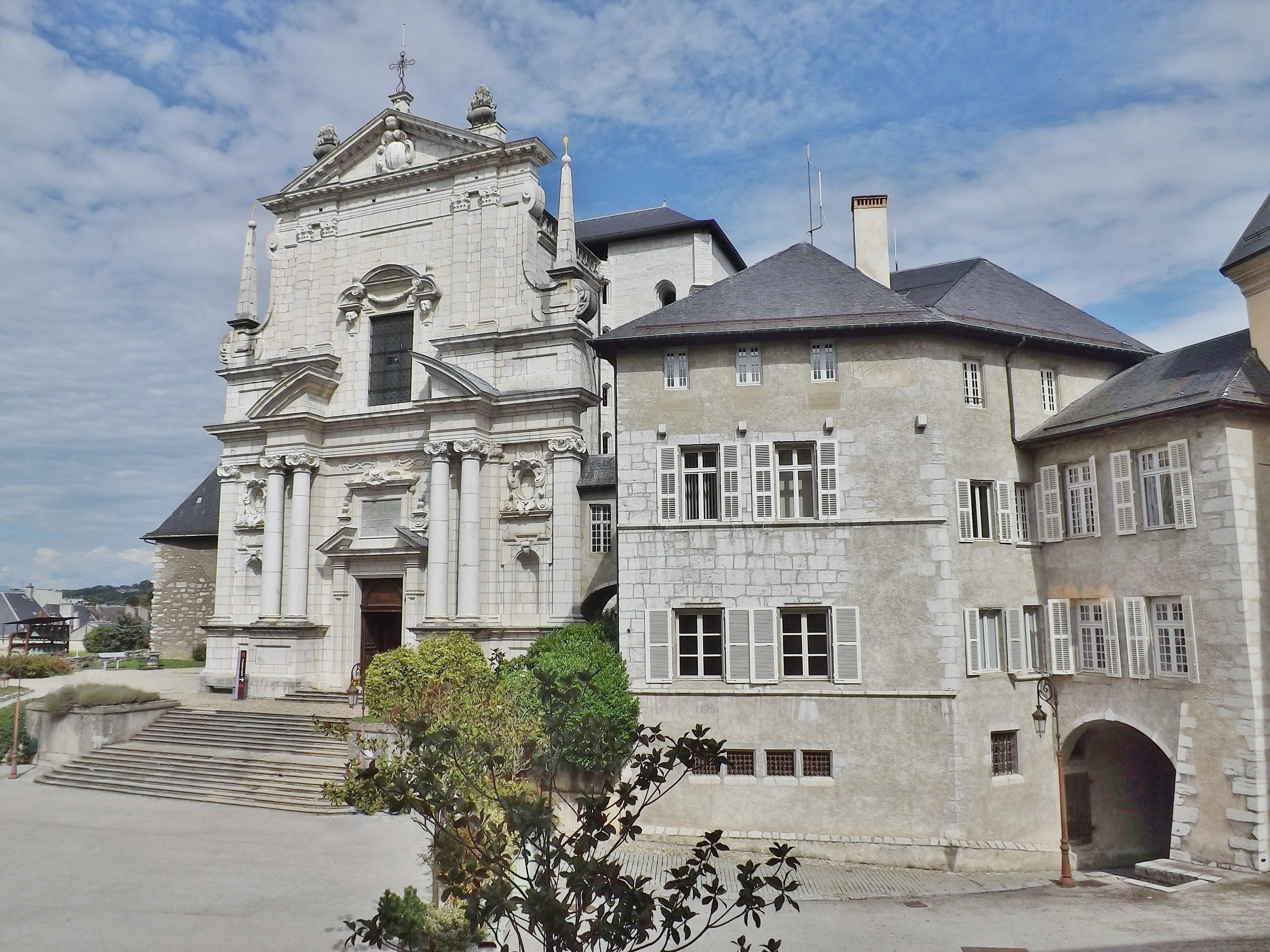
Sainte-Chapelle, intendance building and gateway on the right.

==== The Government Building, the former Chambre des Comptes ====
In 1720, the building that housed the former Chambre des Comptes was registered in the land register between 1728 and 1738, before becoming the home of the Governor of the Duchy. It takes the form of a building with a high facade, which was heightened in the 18th and 19th centuries, altering its appearance. Nevertheless, the northern part of the building, facing the town, still features elements from the 15th and 16th centuries, notably a doorway on the first floor, topped by a carved frame dating from the 15th century.

==== The Intendance building ====
This 15th and 18th-century building, adjoining the Government Building, is separated from the Sainte-Chapelle on the northwest side by a small terraced courtyard. In 1759, it was connected to the royal apartments by a vaulted passageway built over the access ramp, which overlooks the south side after passing through the portcullis. The three-storey, blockwork facade overlooking the main courtyard dates from the 15th century. The various levels are served by a spiral staircase.

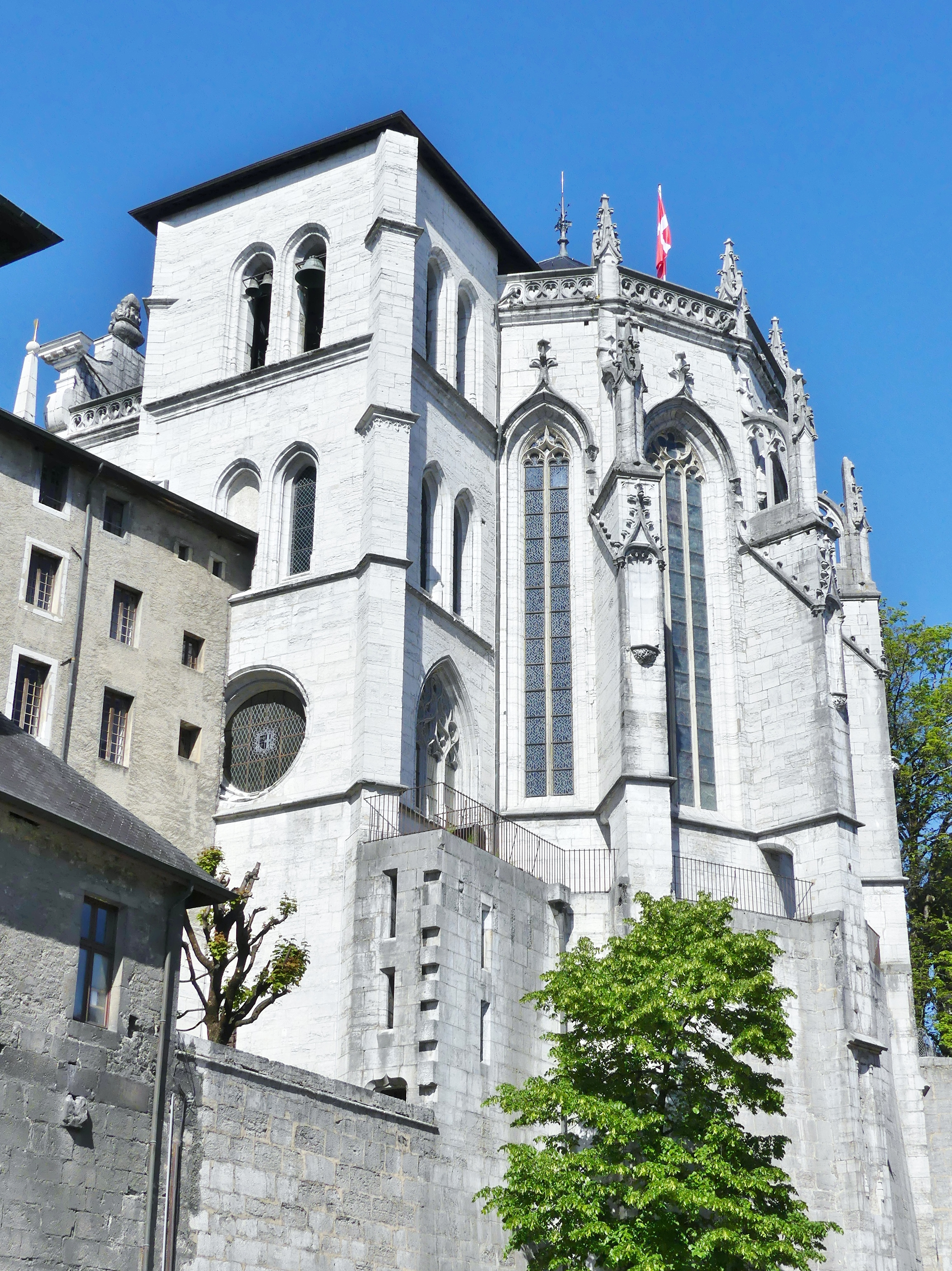
The Sainte-Chapelle, once home to the Holy Shroud, and the Yolande tower of the grand carillon.

==== The Sainte-Chapelle ====
A new gateway, dating from the early 14th century, gives access to the Sainte-Chapelle, built in the early 15th century to replace the château's original chapel, which had become too cramped. It features a single nave extended by a five-sided polygonal apse, and is decorated in the flamboyant Gothic style. It was built between 1408 and 1430 by master builder Nicolet Robert, who also designed the grand kitchens of the 11th-century Grande Salle. The church's chevet rests directly on the castle's north curtain wall. A parapet walk on bracketed machicolations, protected by crenellations, runs around the base of the curtain wall. It was restored in 1895.

The facade, rebuilt in classical style, dates from 1641. Designed by Amadeo de Castellamonte, it was badly damaged during the French Revolution, as was the interior of the chapel, which was destroyed by fire in 1532.

The nave contains two side galleries: the one on the right was reserved for the Duke when he came to hear mass, while the one on the left housed the organ. Victor-Amédée II had another one built against the front wall in 1726. Inside, the chapel features an eighteenth-century altar with a marble tabernacle trimmed with carved and gilded wood, and sixteenth-century stained-glass windows restored in 2002. Paul Guiton described the Sainte-Chapelle as a "poem of stone". From 1502 to 1578, the chapel housed the Holy Shroud in a silver reliquary in the sacristy or in a niche behind the high altar.

The church was used to celebrate the marriages of: Louis de Savoie and Anne de Chypre in 1433, Dauphin Louis and Charlotte de Savoie in 1451, Charles-Emmanuel and Clotilde de France in 1775, Alphonse de Lamartine and Marie Elisa Bich in 1820.

==== The Yolande tower and grand carillon ====
The bell tower, designed by Blaise Neyrand, was built in 1470 at the behest of Yolande de France, Duchess of Savoie. The tower houses a large carillon, known as the "Saint-François de Sales" carillon, with 70 bells.

The origin of this carillon dates back to the 1937 Universal Exhibition in Paris, where a 37-bell carillon made in 1936 by the Paccard foundry was on display. In 1938, the carillon was installed in the upper hall of the Yolande Tower. In 1993, a new 70-bell carillon made by the Paccard company replaced the old one in the château grounds. The large bell weighs 5,100 kg.

==== Nemours chapel ====
This Gothic-style chapel is located to the left of the Sainte-Chapelle.

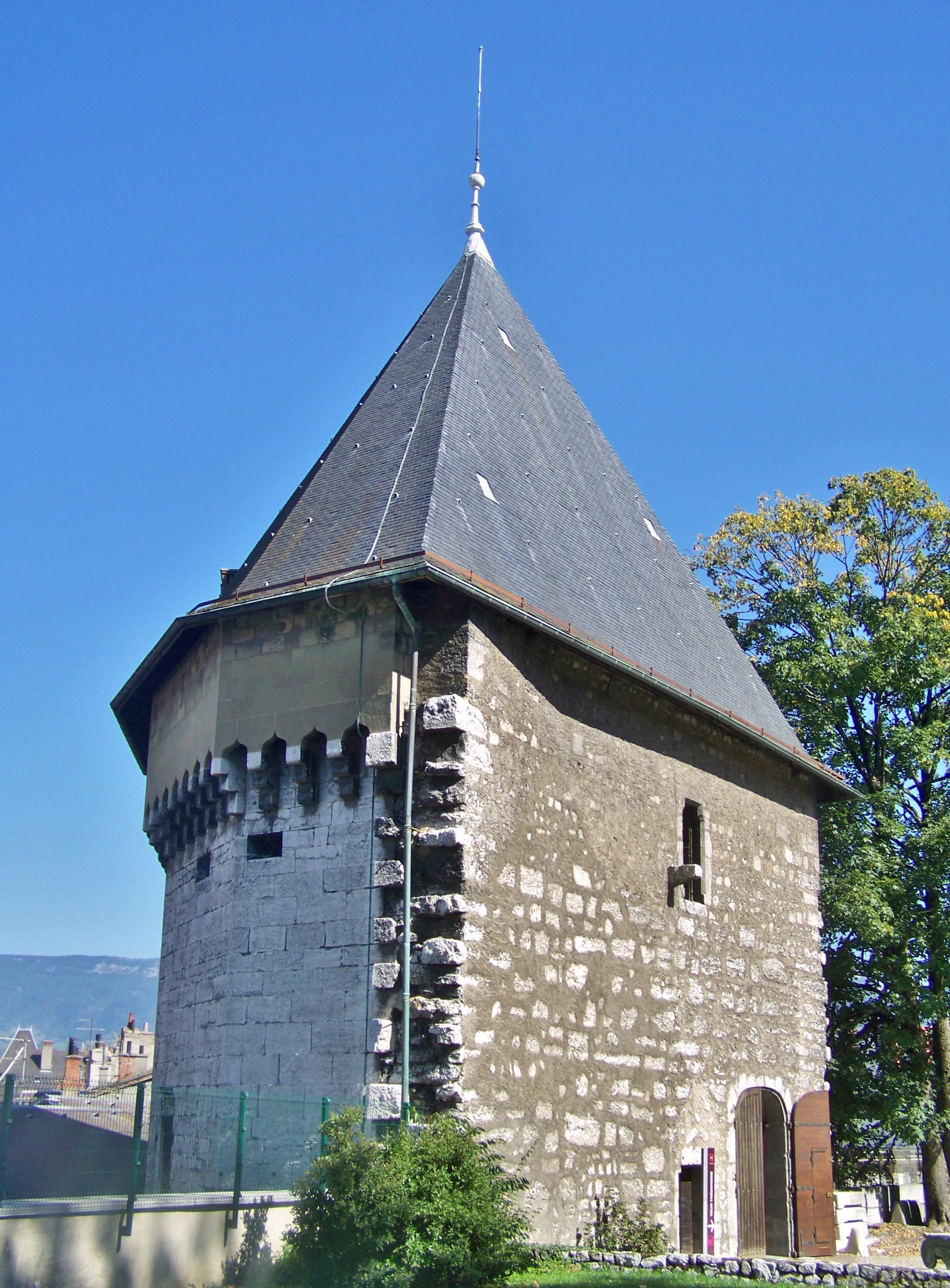
The Treasury Tower.

==== The Treasury Tower ====
Built in the second half of the 14th century, this polygonal tower protrudes from the north curtain wall. It comprises a lower room with a double cannonier dating from the first half of the 15th century, now inaccessible as it was walled up in 1726, lightly vaulted and lit by a barred window, and above it the "upper room", vaulted with fine ribbing, which once housed the dukes' archives before the Treasurer General of Savoie made it his office in 1726. Above, a small room illuminated on all six sides by a bay with a wide splay and the terrace, surrounded by a parapet pierced by seven cruciform archways.

==== The Old Pavilion or Donjon Tower ====
Dating back to the 11th century, this was probably the keep of the first lords of Chambéry. Levelled during the Revolution, it was definitively destroyed by fire in 1798, leaving only the lower rooms, which were rediscovered in 1935 and accessed via an underground passageway. Its destruction opened up this side to the city, and at the top of the staircase built in the early 19th century, the 15th-century portal of the destroyed Chambéry monastery of Saint-Dominique was moved here in 1892, making it the last vestige of the monastery. In its extension, the gardens occupy the space where the columned Grande Salle, the 11th-century aula of the Château de Berlion, once housed the large 15th-century kitchens of Nicolet Robert, and the Tour des Poudres or de la Poype, rebuilt in the early 14th century under Amédée V, once stood. The Grande Salle and Tour des Poudres were also ravaged by the great fire of 1798 and were razed to the ground in 1811, to be replaced by the present gardens.

The remains of the portal of the former Saint-Dominique church have been listed as a historic monument since February 16, 1900.

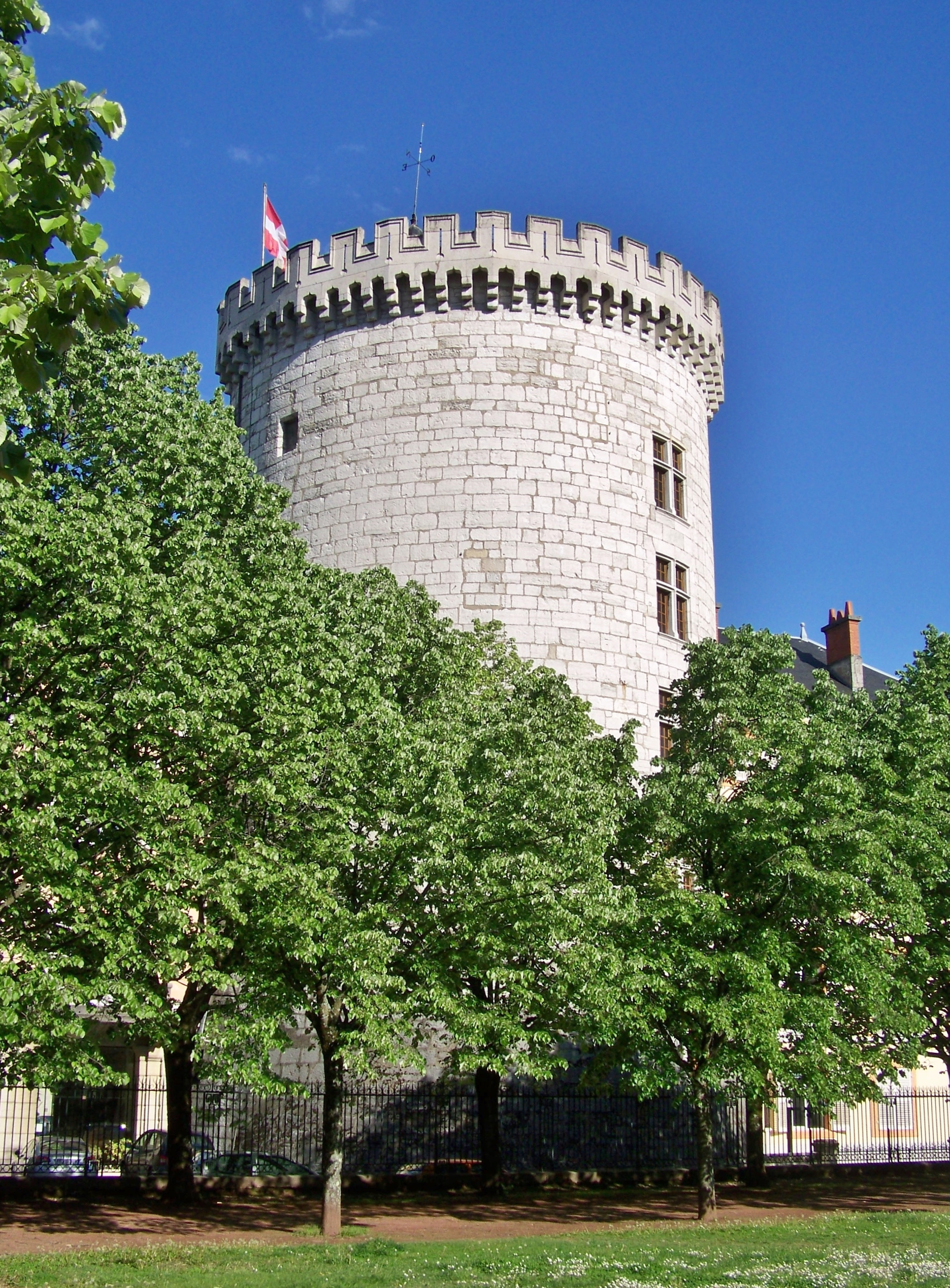
The half-round tower.

==== The half-round tower or Tour des Armes or Tour des Mappes ====
Semicircular in shape, hence its name; in the 13th century it was known as "du Donjon". It was rebuilt for completion in the 15th century, in 1413 or 1433; two storeys high, it was topped, before the fire of 1798, by a peppered roof. Having partially escaped the great fire of 1798, it was restored in 1811 and is now adjoined to the General Council building. In 1735, the Sardinian land registry was installed on the second floor. It protected the access to the château, that of Amédée V, which was originally accessed from this side via a gateway facing the esplanade.

The tower is still used today to access the various floors of the north wing, home to the Savoie departmental council.

==== The former royal apartments ====
They stood to the south, between the Tour aux Armes and the Tour des Archives, and from there an angled return supported the Prince's apartments. They were ruined by fire in 1743, during the Spanish occupation (1742–1749), and finally razed to the ground in 1786, along with the Tour des Édits de la Chambre. The part spared by the fire was rebuilt by the architect Piacenza, on the initiative of Victor-Amédée III. In 1790, they were used as barracks for troops from the Saluces and Montferrat regiments, then as offices for representatives of the Convention and, in Year V, as a school and public library. Like virtually all the other parts of the château, this part suffered the terrible fire of 1798. Repairs were not approved until the 24th of Floréal Year XIII (May 14, 1805).

The current apartments, occupied by government departments, were rebuilt in 1850 by architect Ernest Mélano under Victor-Emmanuel and continued until the Third Republic, when the facades were restored in 1991.

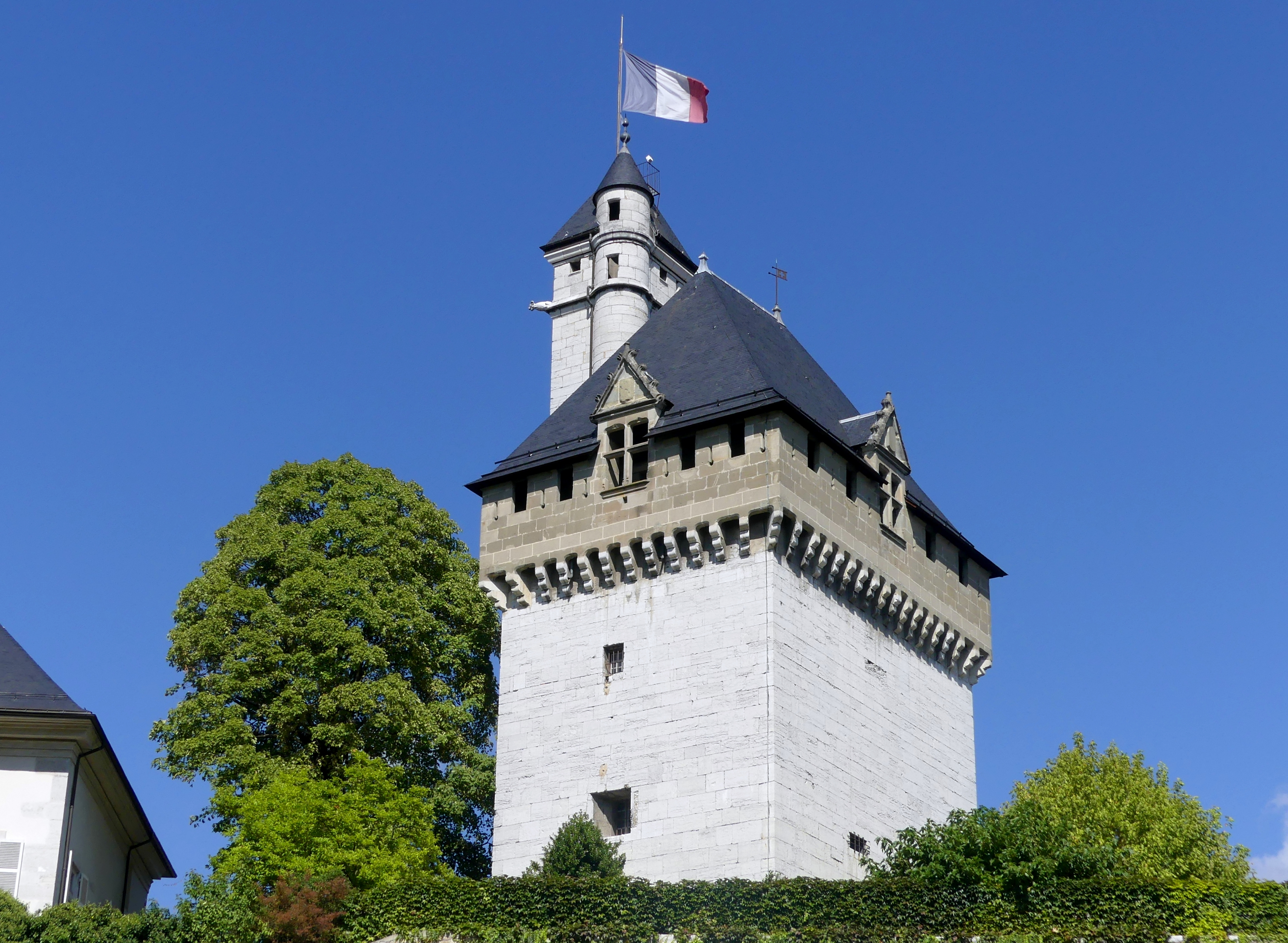
La tour des Archives.

==== The Tour des Archives or Tour du Carrefour ====
Originally, the mound on which the castle stands ended in a gentle slope on this side. Between 1439 and 1445, the Counts had it filled in, creating the Archives terrace and building the tower at the south-east corner, one corner of which intersects the glacis of the enclosure. Jean Mesqui indicates that it was built between 1440 and 1445 on the site of the original motte to the southeast of the enclosure.

The vaulted second floor of the tower had its keystones decorated with the Savoie coat of arms and those of Dukes Louis I of Savoie, Amédée IX of Savoie, and Philibert II of Savoie. Above, the large attic space is encircled by crenellated machicolations pierced by archways. A square stair turret flanks and dominates the tower, serving as a lookout and complemented by a watchtower at the top, rebuilt in 1875. The tower is lit by iron-grilled windows. In the 16th century, it was used as a prison, and in 1726 the archives, originally housed in the Trésorerie tower, were moved here. Repairs were carried out in 1823 and 1861.

==== The southern front ramparts ====
On this side, the rampart ran from the late 15th-century Tour à Poudre, set in a spur and occupying the southeast corner, to the Tour des Armes, extending westwards. Flanked by three towers, including the Edits de la Chambre tower, it was preceded by a low gallery in front of the royal apartments. It was demolished at the same time as the royal apartments, in 1786.

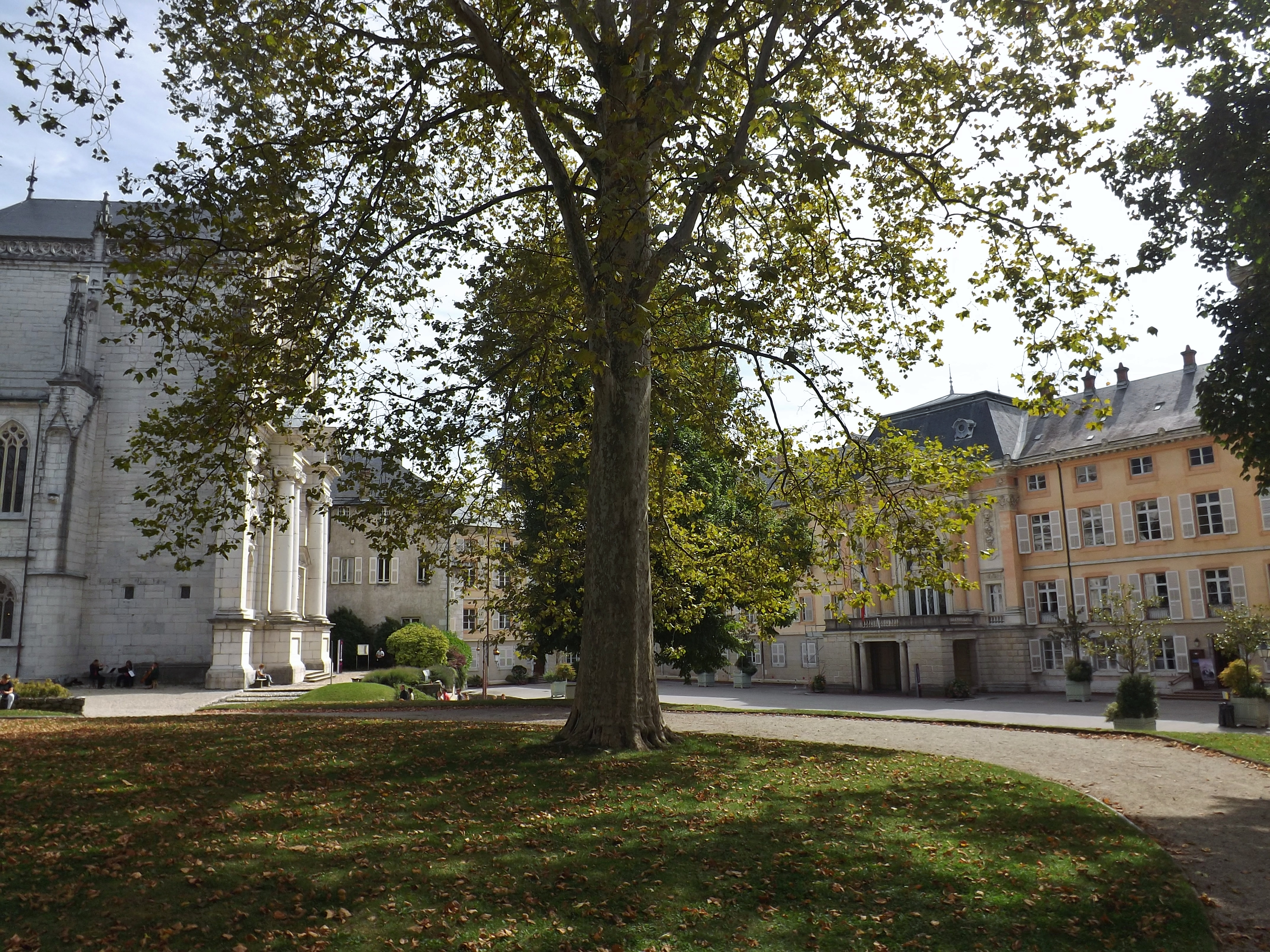
Esplanade and main courtyard.

==== The courtyard of honor ====
The medieval buildings that surrounded it at the beginning of the 18th century have all been destroyed. Even then, only two of the original four towers remained. A fountain with a basin embellished the space.

== Châtellenie of Chambéry ==
=== Châtellenie organization ===
Chambéry castle has been the seat of a châtellenie, also known as a mandement (mandamentum), since the late 13th century. The territory under its control was sufficiently large to be subdivided into five mestralies from 1315.

The five mestralies and their component parishes are:

- Chambéry;
- Chambéry-le-Vieux (Lémenc);
- Saint-Sulpice (Bissy, La Motte, Servolay);
- Couz and Vimines;
- Villette (Barberaz hamlet) or Cognin (Chanaz a Barberaz hamlet, Barberaz, Montagnole).

=== The castellans ===
In the organization of the County of Savoie, the chatelain is an "[officer], appointed for a definite term, revocable and removable" who "since the beginnings of residence, has always gone to a loyalist". He is responsible for managing the châtellenie, collecting the estate's tax revenues, and also looks after the castle's upkeep. His role was therefore multifaceted (judicial, financial and military). When Entre-deux-Guiers was confiscated by Count Amédée V in 1380, the châtelain de Chambéry was also regularly given charge of the châtellenie d'Entre-deux-Guiers, followed by Saint-Alban in the course of the 15th century.

== See also ==
- County of Savoy
- Duchy of Savoy
- Savoyard state
- History of Savoy
- House of Savoy
- Medieval fortification

== Bibliography ==
- Brocard, Michèle; Lagier-Bruno, Lucien; Palluel-Guillard, André (1982). Histoire des communes savoyardes (in French). Éditions Horvath. p. 475. ISBN 978-2-7171-0229-1.
- Brocard, Michèle (1995). Les châteaux de Savoie. Sites et Villages (in French). Éditions Cabédita. p. 328. ISBN 978-2-88295-142-7.
- Chapier, Georges (2005). Châteaux Savoyards : Faucigny, Chablais, Tarentaise, Maurienne, Savoie propre, Genevois. L'amateur Averti (in French). Éditions La Découvrance. p. 410. ISBN 978-2-84265-326-2.
- Filliard, Jeannine; Messiez-Poche, Pierre; Palluel-Guillard, André (1991). "Le château de Chambéry". Mémoires et documents de la Société savoisienne d'histoire et d'archéologie [Memoirs and documents of the Société savoisienne d'histoire et d'archéologie]. L'histoire en Savoie (in French). Société savoisienne d'histoire et d'archéologie. p. 48. ISSN 0046-7510.
- Guilleré, Christian; Palluel-Guillard, André (2011). Le château des ducs de Savoie: dix siècles d'histoire [The Château des Ducs de Savoie: ten centuries of history] (in French). Altal Éditions. ISBN 978-2-916736-20-4.
- Mesqui, Jean (1997). Châteaux forts et fortification en France [Castles and fortifications in France]. Tout l'art. Patrimoine (in French). Éditions Flammarion. p. 493. ISBN 978-2-08-012271-1.
- Perret, André (1965). "Ler château et la Sainte-Chapelle de Chambéry". Congrès archéologique de France. 123e session. Savoie. 1965 [French Archaeological Congress. 123rd session. Savoie. 1965] (in French). Société française d'archéologie. pp. 9–20.
- Sorrel, Christian; Brocard, Michel; Demotz, Bernard; Palluel-Guillard, André (1992). Histoire de Chambéry (in French). Privat. p. 328. ISBN 2-7089-8303-2.
