= Col de Couz =

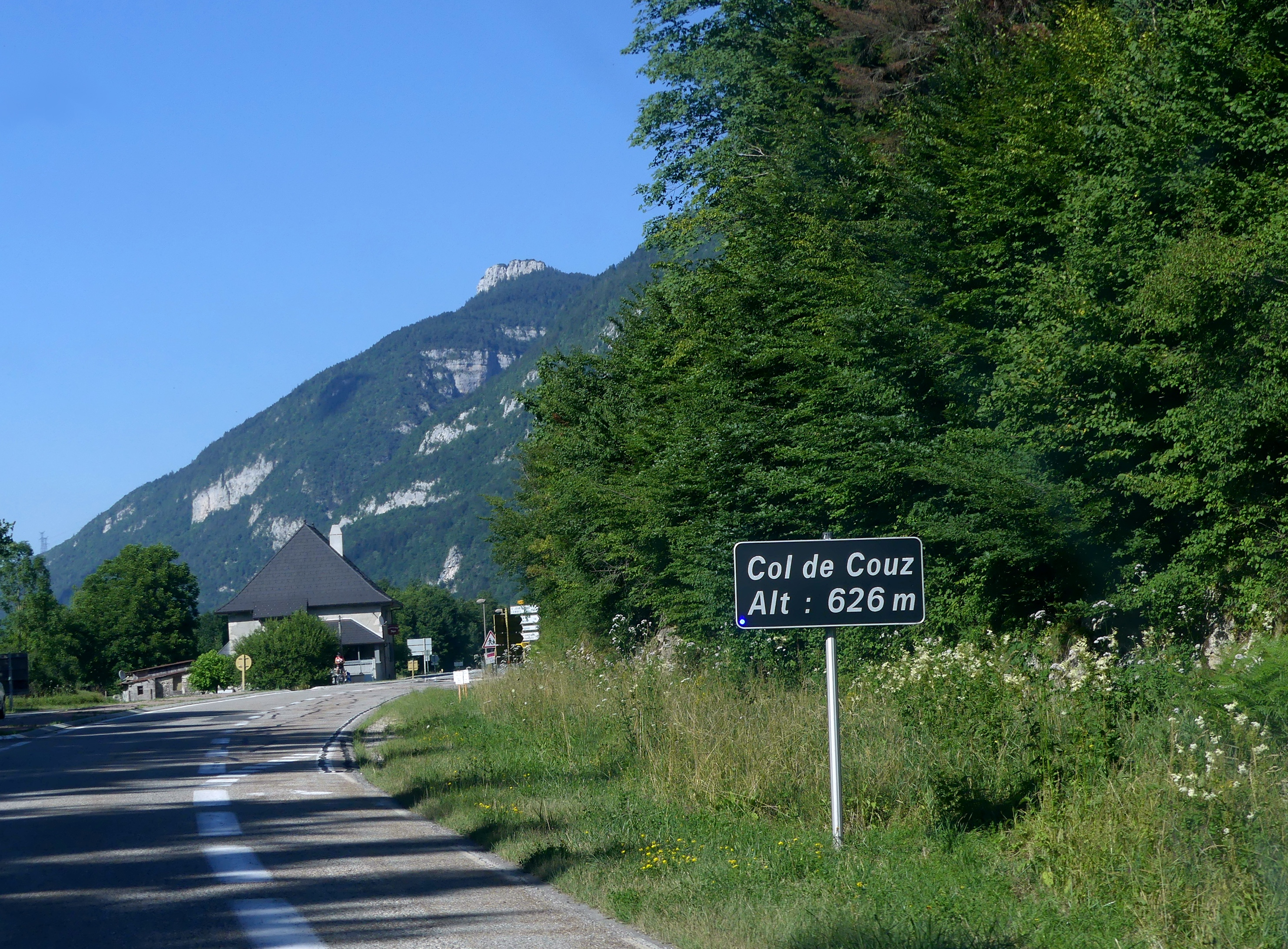
- View of Col de Coux

- Location within France
- Elevation: 624 metres (2,047 ft)
- Traversed by: D1006

Third Approach
- Location: Savoie, France
- Range: Alps
- Coordinates: 45°28′09″N 5°49′02″E

The Col de Couz is a pass located near the village of Saint-Jean-de-Couz, peaking at 624 m above sea level. It is located at equal distances from the ends of the valley of Couz. It connects Chambéry north-east to Les Echelles southwest side. It is crossed by the departmental road 1006. Mount Beauvoir is located west of the Col de Couz.
