= La Cochette =

Mountain in France

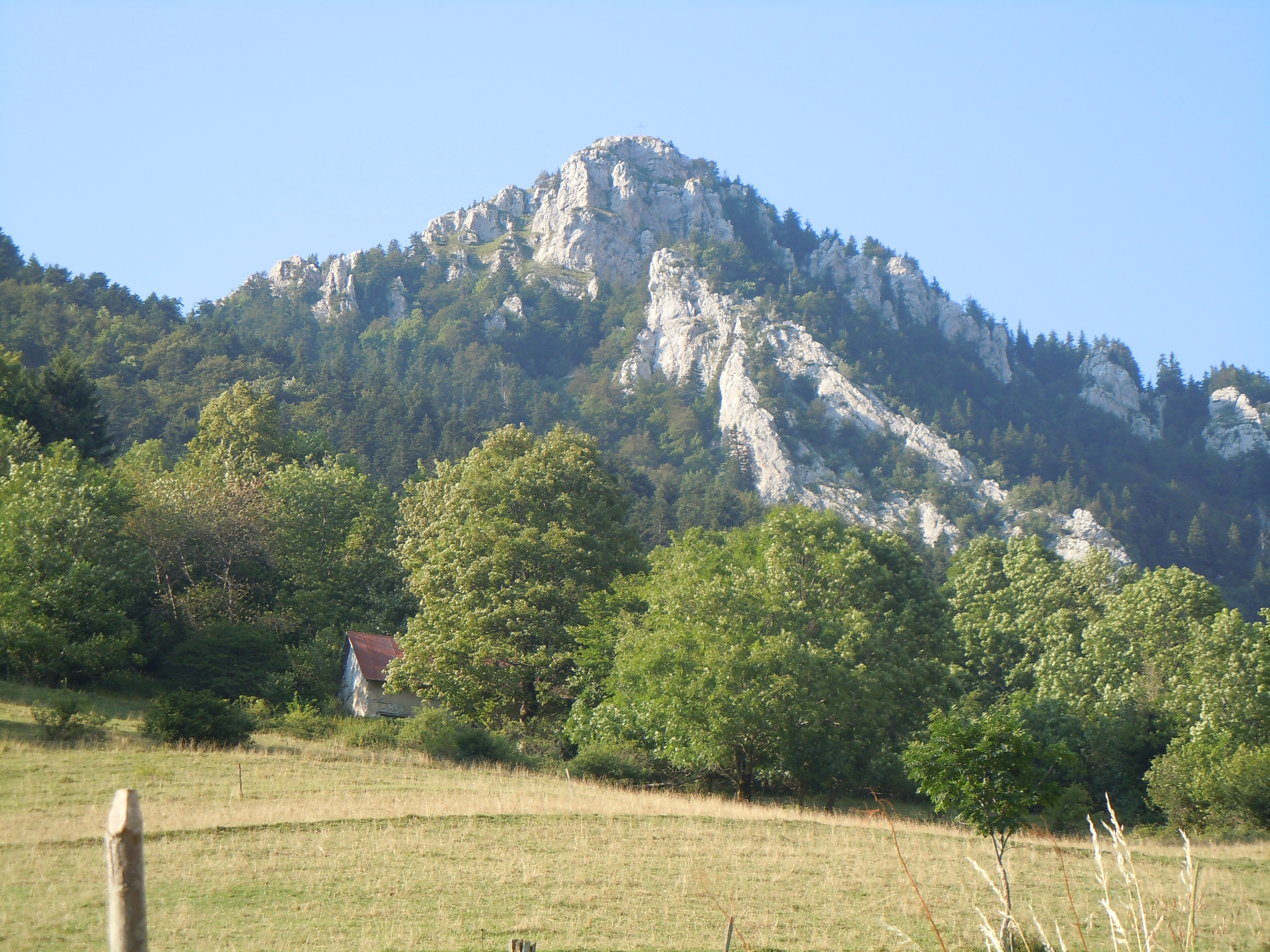
- The view from the hamlet les Cruz (Corbel).

Highest point
- Elevation: 1,618 m (5,308 ft)
- Coordinates: 45°27′19″N 05°50′08″E

Geography
- Location within France
- Location: Savoie, France
- Parent range: Chartreuse Mountains

Climbing
- Easiest route: From the Col du Grapillon

La Cochette (French pronunciation: [la kɔʃɛt]; or Pointe de la Cochette) is a mountain of the Chartreuse Mountains culminating at 1618 m above sea level and located at the edge of Corbel, of Saint-Jean-de-Couz and of Entremont-le-Vieux in Savoie.

== Geography ==
La Cochette is part of the Mount Outheran Range. The link extends to the south by its south antecime, the tip of the Grand Crêt, and ends at the Pointe de Thivelet.

The rocky crest of La Cochette is formed by limestones of Fontanil

== Access ==
Access to the tip of the Cochette passes through the col du Grapillon.

== Environmental protection ==
La Cochette is part of the Regional Natural Park of Chartreuse and the natural area of ecological, faunistic and floristic interest type II of the Chartreuse massif.
