= Col des Égaux =

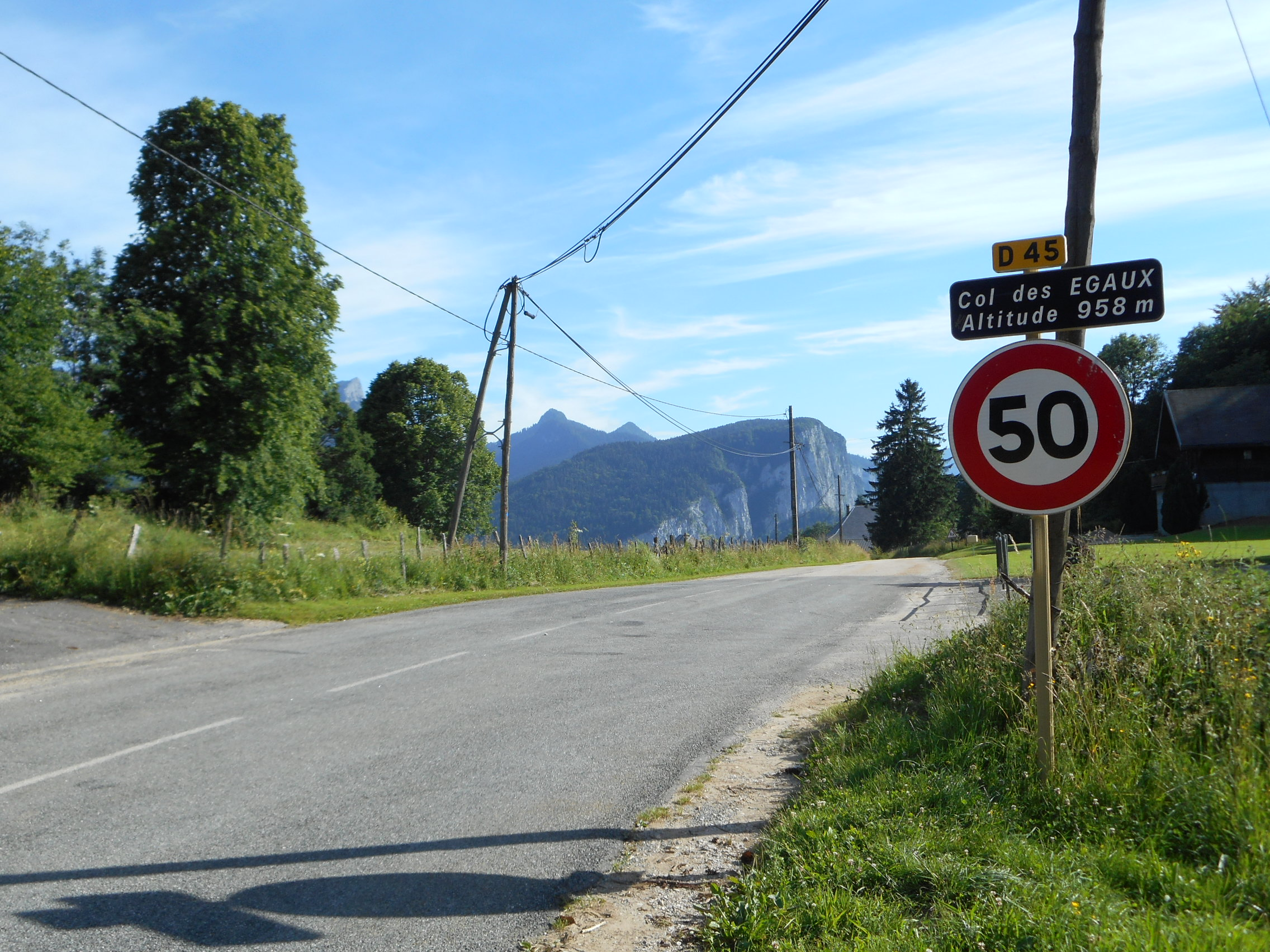
- Col des Egaux landscape

- Location within France
- Elevation: 958 metres (3,143 ft)
- Traversed by: D45

Third Approach
- Location: Savoie, France
- Range: Alps
- Coordinates: 45°26′39″N 5°48′42″E

The Col des Égaux is a Chartreuse Mountains pass rising to 958 m above sea level and located in the southern French department of Savoie, in Rhône-Alpes.

== Geography ==
The Col des Égaux is located near the Égaux hamlet, in the territory of the Corbel district. The Hyères river has its source near the pass.

La Cochette, located at the northeast, is visible from the pass.
