= Gorges du Guiers Vif =

Coordinates: 45.4259°N 5.8118°E

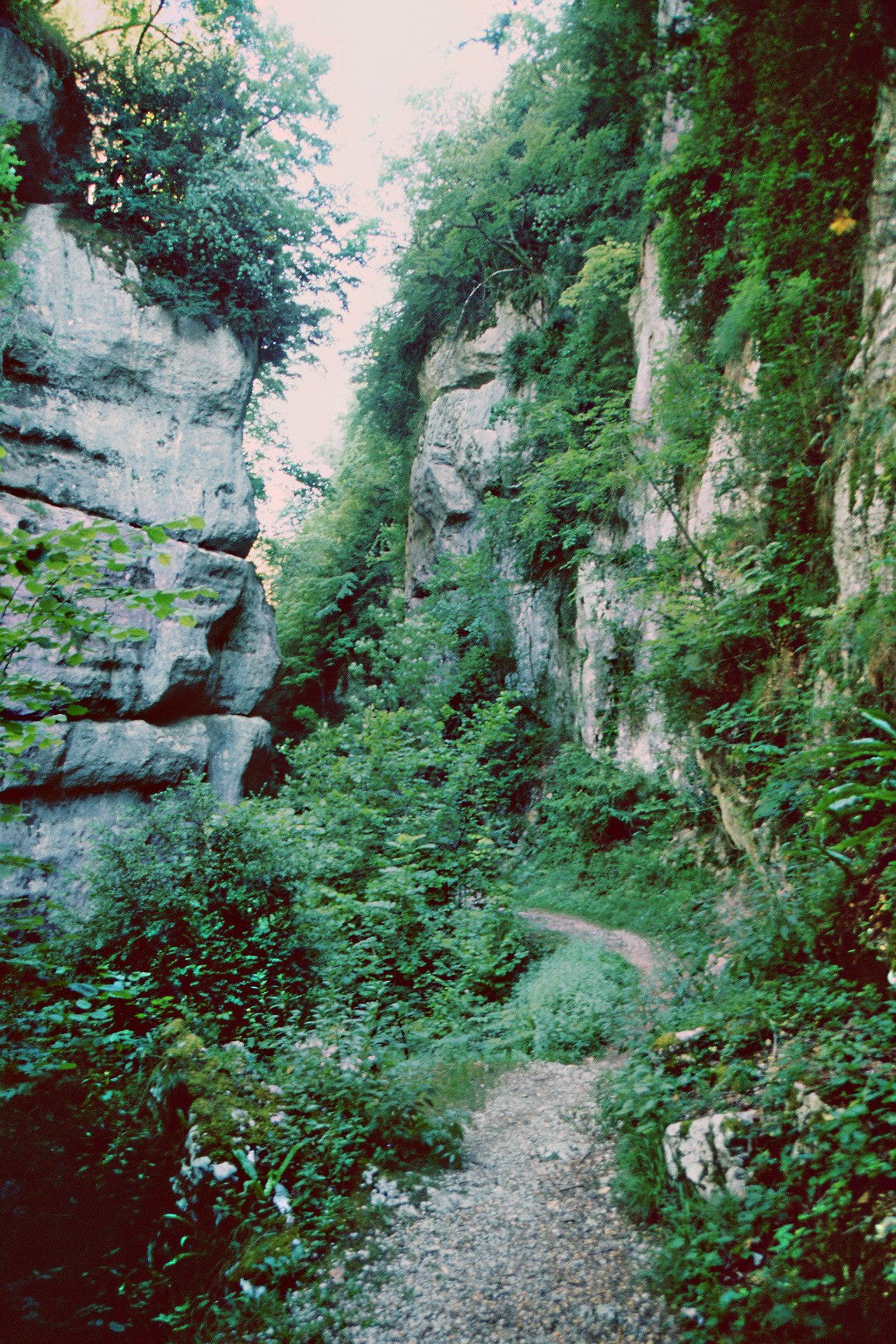

The Gorges du Guiers Vif (or Gorges du Frou) is a canyon located in Isère and Savoie between the towns of Corbel and Saint-Christophe-sur-Guiers, and having as tributary the Guiers Vif.

== Transportation ==
In 1994 a little road was built that directly connects Saint-Pierre-d'Entremont in Savoie to Corbel. It passes through the Gorges du Guiers Vif. However, for driving, it is reserved for the residents.
