= France 3 Auvergne-Rhône-Alpes =

Coordinates: 45°45′30″N 4°51′23″E

France 3 Rhône-Alpes Auvergne
- Logo used since 2018
- Country: France
- Broadcast area: Rhône-Alpes
- Headquarters: Lyon

Ownership
- Owner: France Télévisions

History
- Launched: 1954; 72 years ago
- Former names: RTF Télé-Lyon (1954–1964); ORTF Rhône-Alpes (1964–1975); FR3 Rhône-Alpes Auvergne (1975–1992); France 3 Rhône-Alpes Auvergne (1992–2010)

Links
- Website: France 3 Rhône-Alpes Auvergne

France 3 Rhône-Alpes Auvergne is one of France 3's regional services broadcasting to people in the Auvergne-Rhône-Alpes region. It was founded in 1954 as RTF Télé-Lyon. The service is headquartered in Lyon, the capital of the region, along with newsrooms in Clermont-Ferrand, Grenoble, and Moulins. Programming is also produced by France 3 Rhône-Alpes.

The service can also be seen in Switzerland.

== Presenters ==
- Sébastien Naissant
- Jean-Christophe Solari
- Alain Fauritte

== Programming ==
- Ici 19/20 Grand Lyon
- Ici 19/20 Auvergne
- Ici 19/20 Rhône-Alpes
- Ici 19/20 Saint-Étienne
- Ici 12/13 Rhône-Alpes
- Ici Matin Rhône-Alpes
- Ici 19/20 Édition Touraine Val de Loire
- C'est mieux le matin
- Côté Jardin
- Chroniques d'en haut
- Declik
- Midi Pile du Ici 12/13
- Lézard, culturel
- La voix est libre
- 3 Partout
- Goûtez voir
- Le mag

== See also ==
- France 3
- France 3 Alpes
