= Col du Grapillon =

French mountain pass

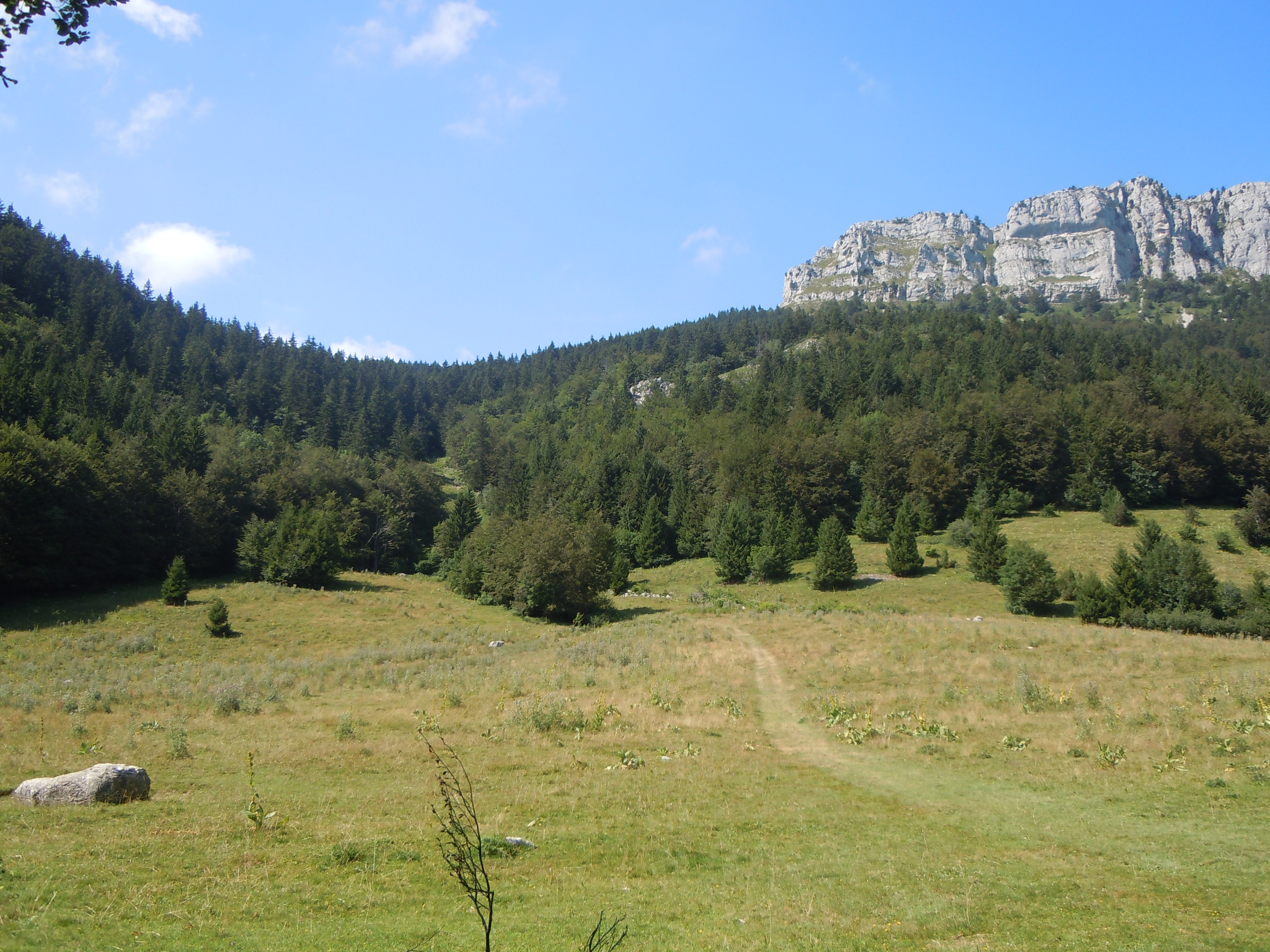
- View of the east side of the Col du Grapillon

- Location within France
- Elevation: 1,509 metres (4,951 ft)

Third Approach
- Location: Savoie, France
- Range: Chartreuse Mountains
- Coordinates: 45°27′46″N 5°50′30″E

The Col du Grapillon (or col de Grapillon) is a mountain pass located 1,509 metres (4,951 ft) above sea level in the Chartreuse Mountains between La Cochette (1,618 metres (5,308 ft)) to the south, and Mont Outheran (1,673 metres (5,489 ft)) to the north

== Access ==
The pass is available only to hikers. It connects Le Désert d'Entremont (Entremont-le-Vieux district) to Saint-Thibaud-de-Couz, and it's the southern access path of the Mont Outheran and northern access path of La Cochette. The easiest access is from the hamlet of les Bruyères on the D45, 500 metres (550 yd) north of Col de la Cluse.

== Environmental protection ==
The Col du Grapillon is part of the natural area of ecological, faunistic and floristic interest of Mont Outheran.
