= Mont Outheran =

Mountain in France

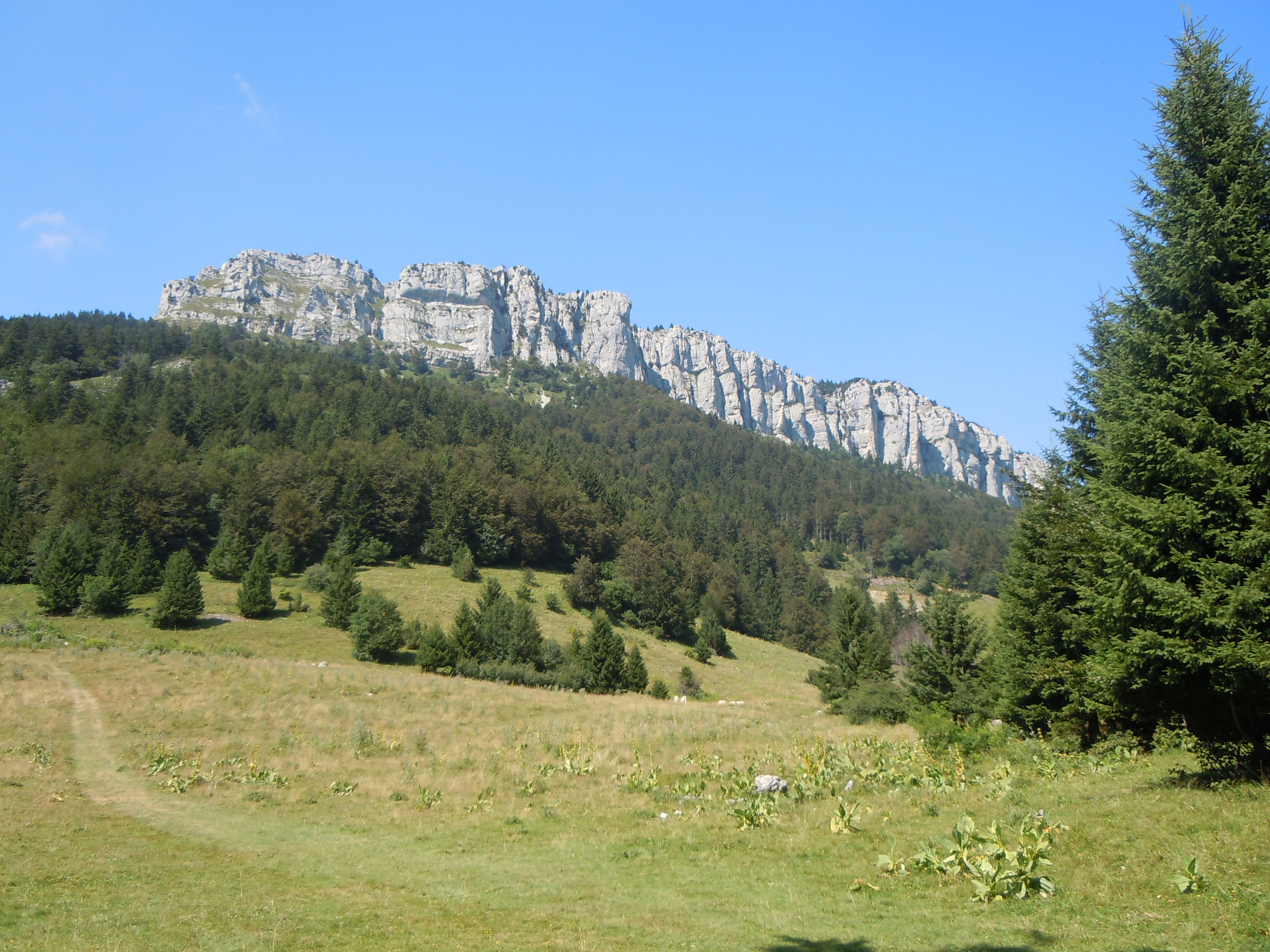

Highest point
- Elevation: 1,676 m (5,499 ft)
- Prominence: 153 m (502 ft)
- Coordinates: 45°27′57″N 05°50′42″E

Geography
- Location within Alps
- Location: Savoie, France
- Parent range: Chartreuse Mountains

Mont Outheran is a mountain 1,676 metres (5,499 ft) high located in the Chartreuse massif of the French Prealps, Savoie, France.

== Geography ==
Mont Outheran is a narrow plateau, lying several kilometers in the north-south direction between the Col du Grapillon at the south and the Col du Planet at the north. It is surrounded by cliffs on all sides. It lies within the communes of Saint-Thibaud-de-Couz and Entrement-le-Vieux, with the western cliffs forming the boundary. Much of Mont Outheran is wholly owned by Saint-Thibaud-de-Couz.

Mont Outheran is formed from Urgonian limestone, overlaying Hauterivian marls.

== Hiking ==
Mont Outheran is traversed by a hiking route between Col du Grappillon and Col du Mollard. The final part of the ascent from Col du Grappillon is exposed, and requires some scrambling in the Pas du Cuert which leads on to the plateau.

== Caves ==
Although about 50 natural limestone shafts have been identified on the plateau, no significant cave systems have been discovered. There are two caves which are over 100 metres (330 ft) deep. Gouffre Mollard is 117 metres (384 ft) deep, and 119 metres (390 ft) long, and Gouffre du Mont Outheran is 112 metres (367 ft) deep, and 120 metres (390 ft) long.
