= Pointe de Thivelet =

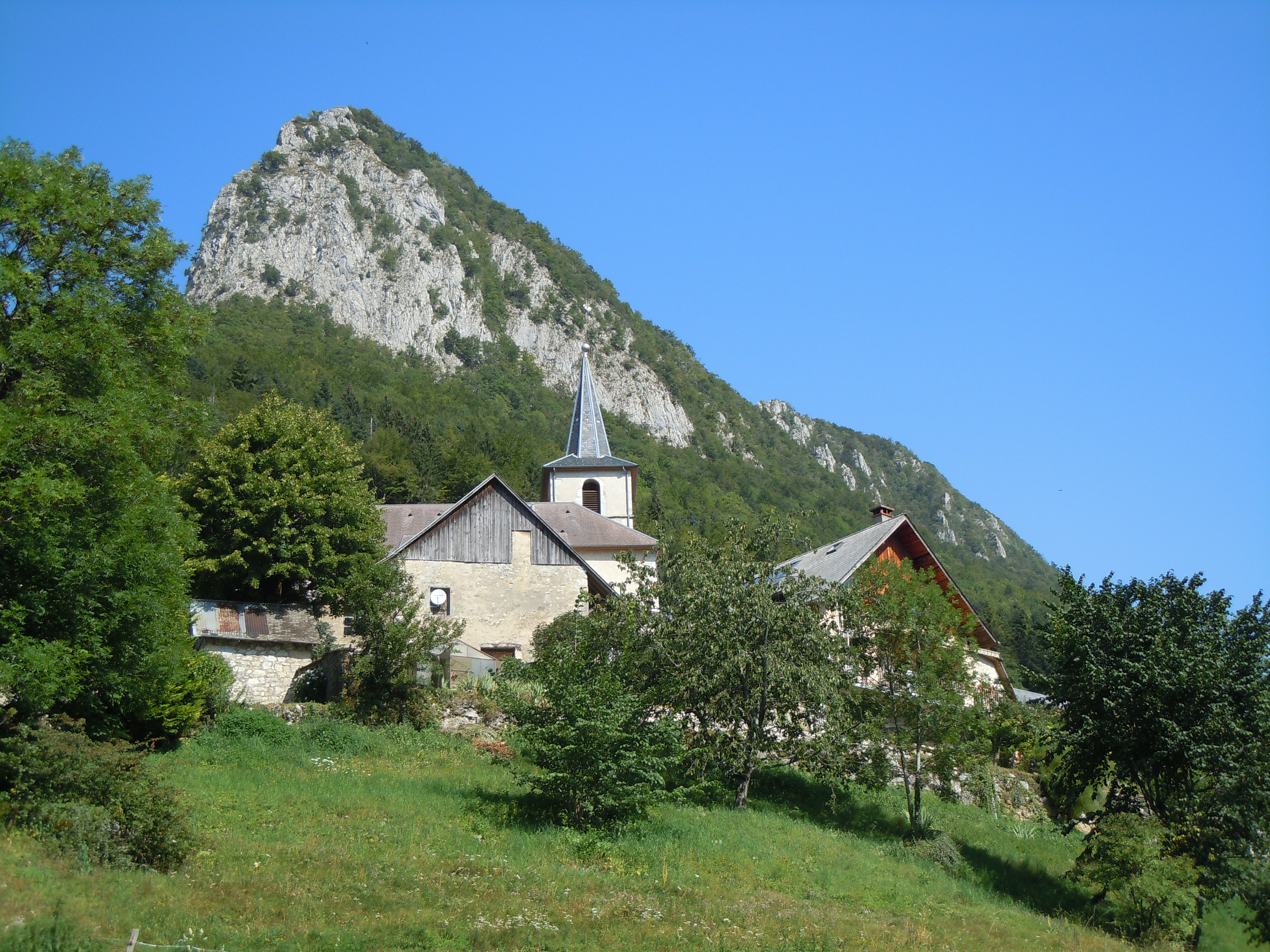
- View on La Pointe de Thivelet from Corbel.

Highest point
- Elevation: 1,231 m (4,039 ft)
- Coordinates: 45°26′05″N 05°49′19″E

Geography
- Location within France
- Location: Savoie, France
- Parent range: Chartreuse Mountains

La Pointe de Thivelet (or Pointe de Thimelet) is mountain culminating at 1231 m above sea level and located in the township of Corbel in Savoie. It is situated in the Chartreuse Mountains, which encompass more that 7000 square Km of protected natural areas. The mountain range is the gateway to the Alps from Lyon and is home to diverse animal populations in dense forest of conifers and deciduous trees.
