= Saint-Thibaud-de-Couz =

Saint-Thibaud-de-Couz Sin Tibô (Savoyard)
- Commune
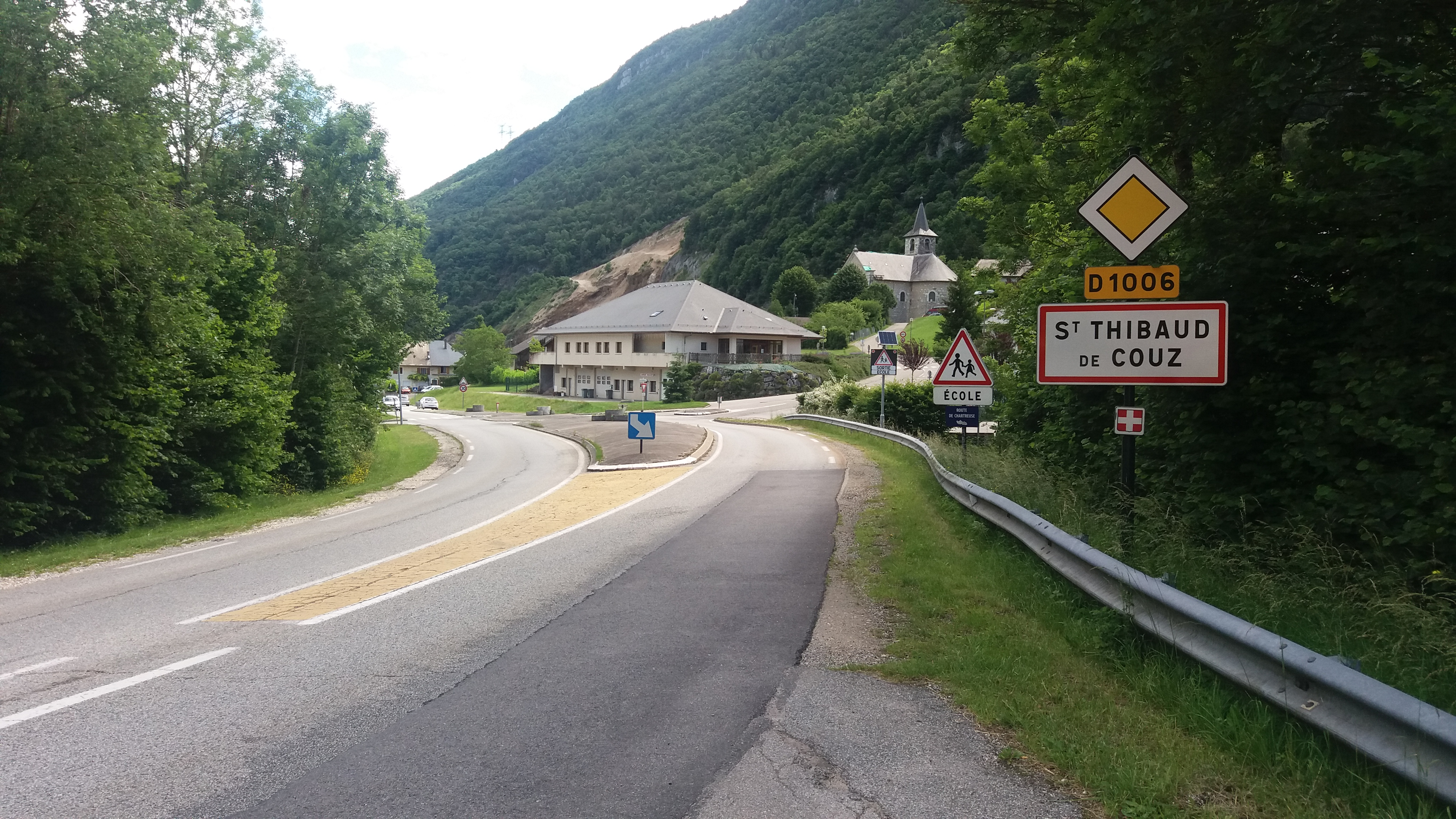
- The road into Saint-Thibaud-de-Couz
- Location of Saint-Thibaud-de-Couz
- Location within France Location within Auvergne-Rhône-Alpes
- Coordinates: 45°30′06″N 5°50′42″E
- Country: France
- Region: Auvergne-Rhône-Alpes
- Department: Savoie
- Arrondissement: Chambéry
- Canton: Le Pont-de-Beauvoisin
- Intercommunality: CC Cœur de Chartreuse

Government
  - Mayor (2026–32): Marion Fayard
- Area^{1}: 24.17 km^{2} (9.33 sq mi)
- Highest elevation: 1,676 m (5,499 ft)
- Lowest elevation: 460 m (1,510 ft)
- Population (2023): 1,107
  - Density: 45.80/km^{2} (118.6/sq mi)
- Time zone: UTC+01:00 (CET)
  - Summer (DST): UTC+02:00 (CEST)
- INSEE/Postal code: 73282 /73160
- Website: www.st-thibaud-de-couz.fr
- ^{1} French Land Register data, which excludes lakes, ponds, glaciers > 1 km^{2} (0.386 sq mi or 247 acres) and river estuaries.

Saint-Thibaud-de-Couz (pronounced [sɛ̃ tibo də ku]; Savoyard: Sin Tibô) is a commune of the Savoie department in the Auvergne-Rhône-Alpes region in south-eastern France.

== Geography ==
The village of Saint-Thibaud-de-Couz is located in the Val de Couz, which corresponds the middle valley of the Hyères Valley. The surrounding mountains are Mont Grêle (1,425 m) to the northwest, Mont Beauvoir (1,320 m) to the southwest, and Mont Outheran (1,676 m) to the southeast.

Saint-Thibaud-de-Couz is located 14 km from Saint-Christophe-sur-Guiers and Les Échelles to the south, and 10 km from Chambéry to the north, via departmental road 1006. This same road also leads to the Col de Couz, located approximately 5 km to the south.

Forests cover half of the township. The township is part of the Communauté de communes Cœur de Chartreuse.

== Toponymy ==
In the eleventh century, a Breton monk named Theobaldus built for pilgrims and travelers a "Hostellerie priory", at a place called Pre Chartreux between the Gencourt and the Poulemonts. Theobaldus gave the town its name (Thibaud), we called then the town under the name of Saint Thibaud.

Full name Saint-Thibaud-de-Couz is mentioned for the first time in Latin in 1497 in the cartulary Labaudie "Parrochia Sancti theobaldi de Couz". The name Couz, which means "pass" was used to refer to the Hyères valley until the Caves parade.

== History ==
After the planning of the caves parade by Charles Emmanuel II in 1670, crossing of the marshes of Saint-Thibaud-de-Couz located in the plain was still a real problem. Many travelers complained to the authorities; there was even, say, three people mired with their carriage in 1684. It was the draining of wetlands under Napoleon that allowed to borrow road Chambéry - Lyon without much difficulties.

In the late 1990s, excavations have revealed traces of prehistoric occupation, dating from the late high Palaeolithic (12 000 years BC.)

== Personalities ==
- Philibert II of Savoy
- Charles Emmanuel II
- Germaine Veyret-Verner

== Sights ==
- Church of Saint-Thibaud de Couz

== See also ==
- Communes of the Savoie department
