= France 3 Alpes =

- Logo used since 2018
- Country: France
- Broadcast area: Auvergne-Rhône-Alpes; Rhône-Alpes
- Headquarters: La Tronche

Ownership
- Owner: France Télévisions

History
- Launched: 1968; 58 years ago
- Former names: ORTF Rhône-Alpes (1968–1975); FR3 Rhône-Alpes Auvergne (1975–1992); France 3 Rhône-Alpes Auvergne (1992–2010)

Links
- Website: France 3 Alpes

France 3 Alpes is one France 3's regional broadcasting services to people in the Rhône-Alpes region. It was launched as ORTF Rhône-Alpes in 1968. It is headquartered in La Tronche. The service is also one of 2 services to be broadcast to people living in the region, the other being France 3 Rhône-Alpes, which is broadcast from Lyon. France 3 Alpes also produces news content. It is also received in Switzerland.

== Presenters ==
- Delphine Aldebert
- Jean-Christophe Solari

== Programming ==
- Ici 19/20 Alpes
- Ici 19/20 Grenoble
- Ici 12/13 Alpes
- Ici Matin Alpes
- La voix est libre
- Midi Pile
- Alpes Express
