= Mont Beauvoir =

- Mount Beauvoir
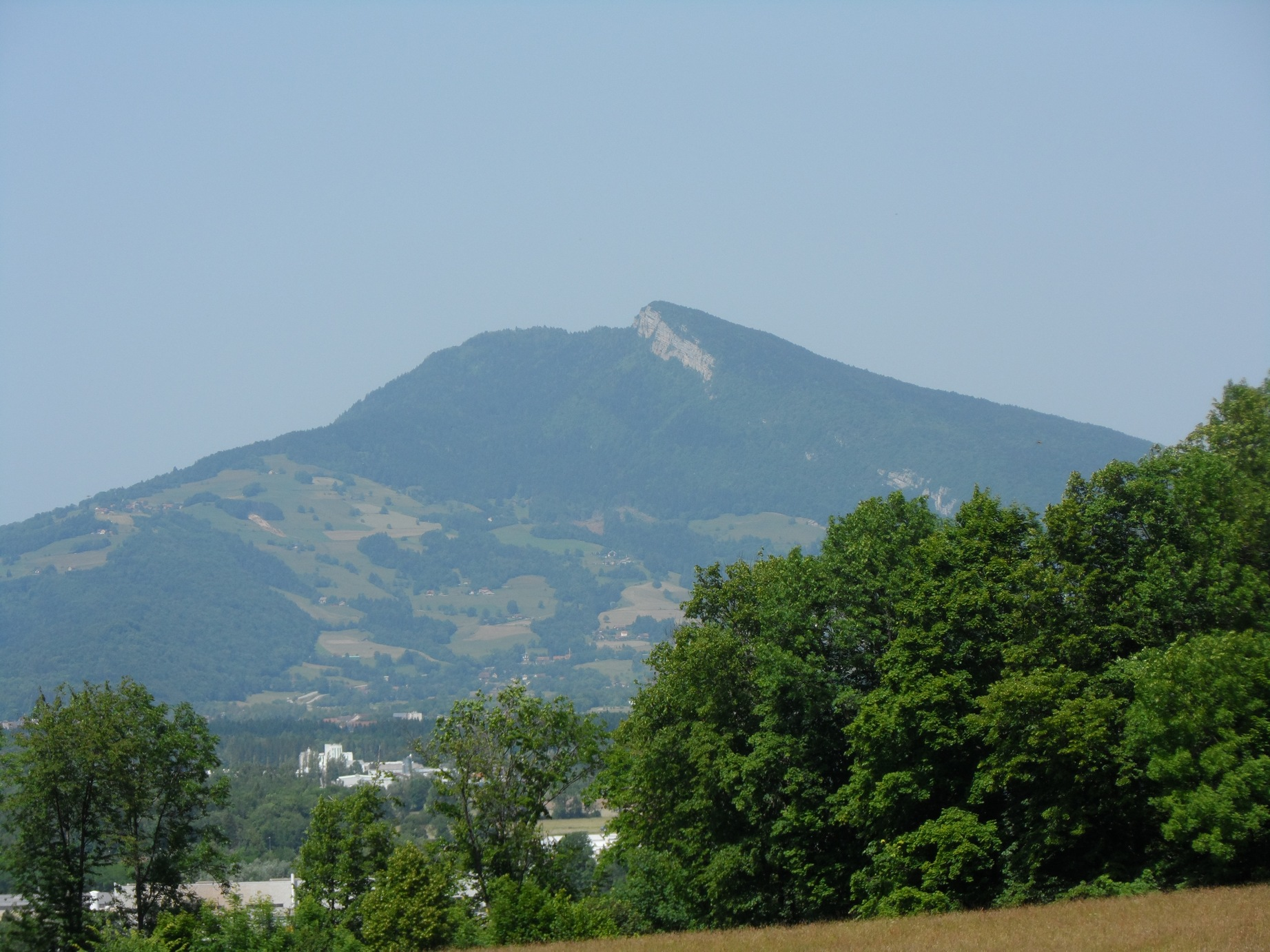

Highest point
- Elevation: 1,320 m (4,330 ft)
- Coordinates: 45°28′36″N 05°47′30″E

Geography
- Location within France
- Location: Savoie, France
- Parent range: Chartreuse Mountains

Mont Beauvoir is a Chartreuse mountain culminating at 1,320 metres (4,331 ft) above sea level in the township of Saint-Jean-de-Couz in the French department of Savoie. Mont Beauvoir is part of the Jura Mountain range.

== Geography ==
Mount Beauvoir forms a ridge southwest / northeast and is mainly composed of forest (conifers).

== Access ==
It can be reached by the departmental road 1006 from Saint-Jean-de-Couz or after the tunnel of Les Échelles.
