= Les Échelles =

Les Échelles Lez Eshyéle (Savoyard)
- Commune
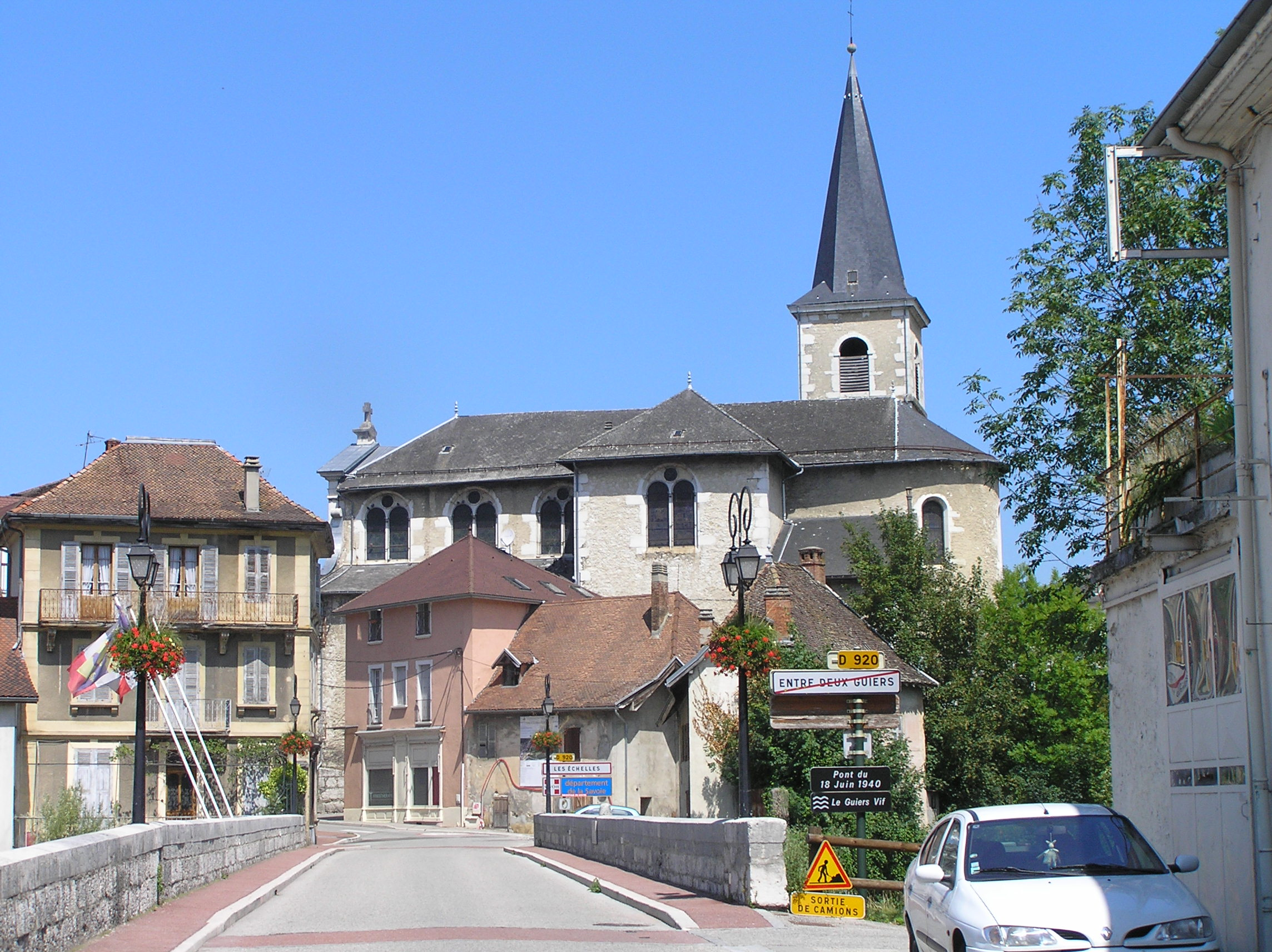
- The church in Les Échelles

- Coat of arms
- Location of Les Échelles
- Location within France Location within Auvergne-Rhône-Alpes
- Coordinates: 45°26′15″N 5°45′17″E
- Country: France
- Region: Auvergne-Rhône-Alpes
- Department: Savoie
- Arrondissement: Chambéry
- Canton: Le Pont-de-Beauvoisin
- Intercommunality: CC Cœur de Chartreuse

Government
  - Mayor (2020–2026): Cédric Vial
- Area^{1}: 3.75 km^{2} (1.45 sq mi)
- Highest elevation: 459 m (1,506 ft)
- Lowest elevation: 364 m (1,194 ft)
- Population (2023): 1,286
  - Density: 343/km^{2} (888/sq mi)
- Time zone: UTC+01:00 (CET)
  - Summer (DST): UTC+02:00 (CEST)
- INSEE/Postal code: 73105 /73360
- ^{1} French Land Register data, which excludes lakes, ponds, glaciers > 1 km^{2} (0.386 sq mi or 247 acres) and river estuaries.

Les Échelles (French pronunciation: [le.z‿eʃɛl]; Savoyard: Lez Eshyéle) is a commune in the Savoie department in the Auvergne-Rhône-Alpes region in south-eastern France.

== See also ==
- Communes of the Savoie department
