= Saint-Maurice-de-Rotherens =

Saint-Maurice-de-Rotherens Sant-Mœris (Savoyard)
- Part of Saint-Genix-les-Villages
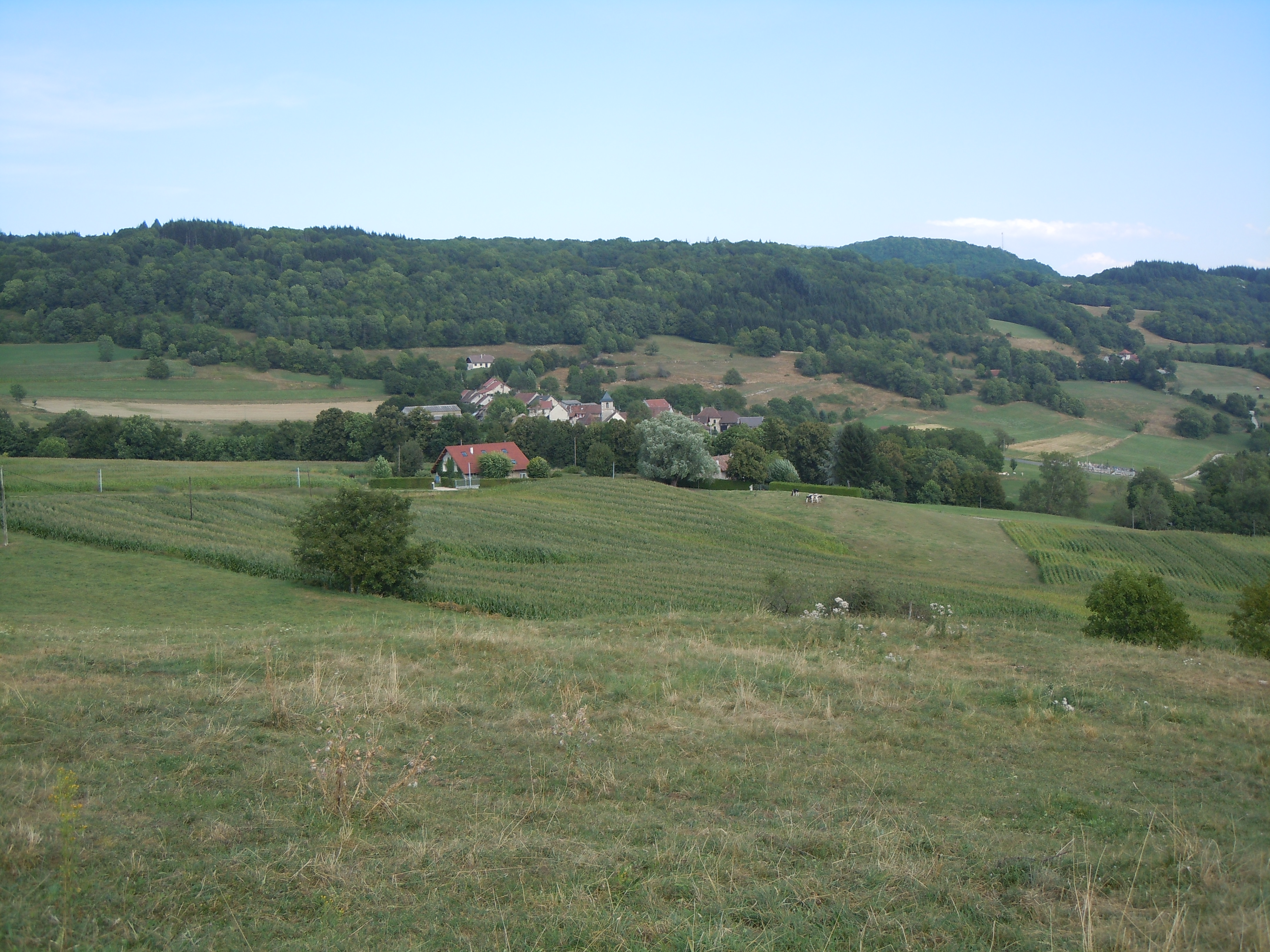
- A general view of Saint-Maurice de Rotherens
- Location of Saint-Maurice-de-Rotherens
- Location within France Location within Auvergne-Rhône-Alpes
- Coordinates: 45°37′18″N 5°41′57″E
- Country: France
- Region: Auvergne-Rhône-Alpes
- Department: Savoie
- Arrondissement: Chambéry
- Canton: Bugey savoyard
- Commune: Saint-Genix-les-Villages
- Area^{1}: 8.17 km^{2} (3.15 sq mi)
- Highest elevation: 880 m (2,890 ft)
- Lowest elevation: 376 m (1,234 ft)
- Population (2022): 225
  - Density: 27.5/km^{2} (71.3/sq mi)
- Time zone: UTC+01:00 (CET)
  - Summer (DST): UTC+02:00 (CEST)
- Postal code: 73240
- ^{1} French Land Register data, which excludes lakes, ponds, glaciers > 1 km^{2} (0.386 sq mi or 247 acres) and river estuaries.

Saint-Maurice-de-Rotherens (Savoyard: Sant-Mœris) is a former commune in the Savoie department in the Auvergne-Rhône-Alpes region in south-eastern France. On 1 January 2019, it was merged into the new commune Saint-Genix-les-Villages. In 2022, it had 225 residents.

== Geography ==
The commune is located on the ridge of Mont Tournier. Saint-Maurice-de-Rotherens is located 1.6 km from Gresin and 1.6 km from Gerbaix.

== See also ==
- Communes of the Savoie department
