= Saint-Genix-sur-Guiers =

Saint-Genix-sur-Guiers San Ni (Savoyard)
- Part of Saint-Genix-les-Villages
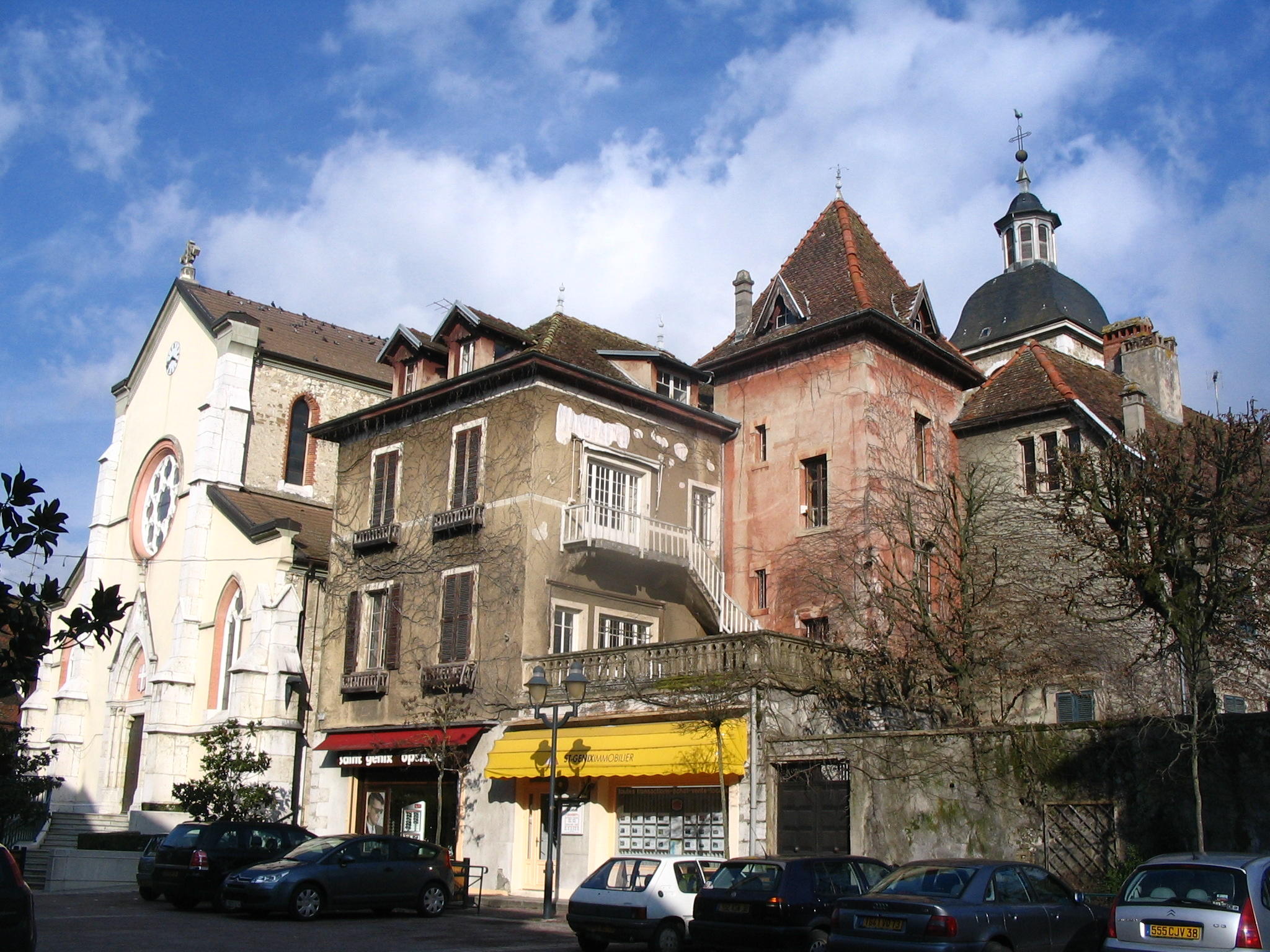
- The church square in Saint-Genix-sur-Guiers

- Coat of arms
- Location of Saint-Genix-sur-Guiers
- Location within France Location within Auvergne-Rhône-Alpes
- Coordinates: 45°36′05″N 5°38′07″E
- Country: France
- Region: Auvergne-Rhône-Alpes
- Department: Savoie
- Arrondissement: Chambéry
- Canton: Bugey savoyard
- Commune: Saint-Genix-les-Villages
- Area^{1}: 12.27 km^{2} (4.74 sq mi)
- Highest elevation: 489 m (1,604 ft)
- Lowest elevation: 208 m (682 ft)
- Population (2022): 2,427
  - Density: 197.8/km^{2} (512.3/sq mi)
- Time zone: UTC+01:00 (CET)
  - Summer (DST): UTC+02:00 (CEST)
- Postal code: 73240
- Website: www.saint-genix-sur-guiers.com
- ^{1} French Land Register data, which excludes lakes, ponds, glaciers > 1 km^{2} (0.386 sq mi or 247 acres) and river estuaries.

Saint-Genix-sur-Guiers (Savoyard: San Ni) is a former commune in the Savoie department in the Auvergne-Rhône-Alpes region in south-eastern France. On 1 January 2019, it was merged into the new commune Saint-Genix-les-Villages.

Saint-Genix-sur-Guiers is known for its cakes (gâteau de Saint-Genix) that are filled and decorated with pink pralines.

== See also ==
- Communes of the Savoie department
