= Avressieux =

Avressieux Avarcheû (Savoyard)
- Commune
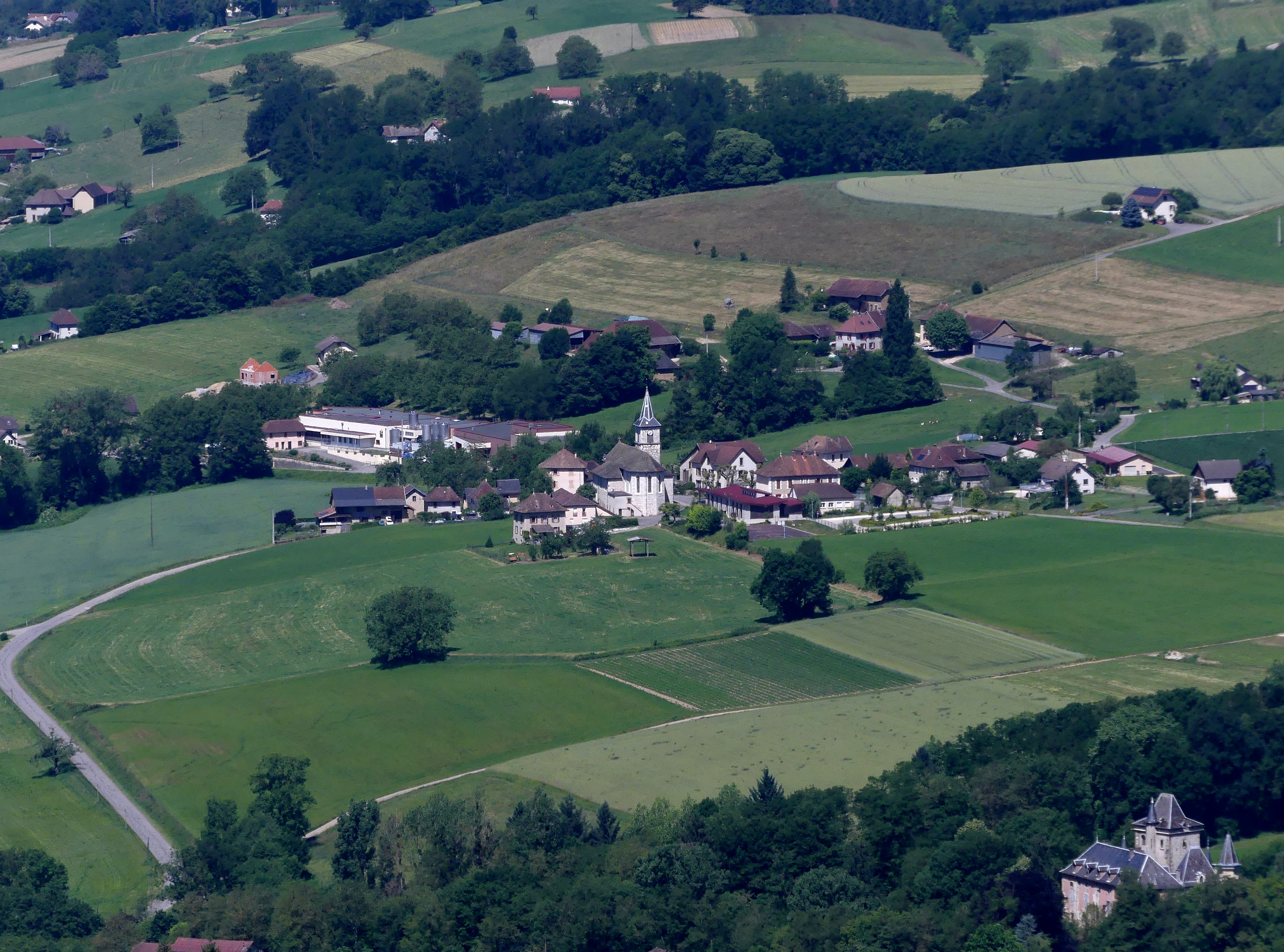
- A general view of Avressieux

- Coat of arms
- Location of Avressieux
- Location within France Location within Auvergne-Rhône-Alpes
- Coordinates: 45°34′23″N 5°41′43″E
- Country: France
- Region: Auvergne-Rhône-Alpes
- Department: Savoie
- Arrondissement: Chambéry
- Canton: Bugey savoyard
- Intercommunality: CC Val Guiers

Government
  - Mayor (2020–2026): Paul Régallet
- Area^{1}: 8.07 km^{2} (3.12 sq mi)
- Highest elevation: 477 m (1,565 ft)
- Lowest elevation: 234 m (768 ft)
- Population (2023): 544
  - Density: 67.4/km^{2} (175/sq mi)
- Time zone: UTC+01:00 (CET)
  - Summer (DST): UTC+02:00 (CEST)
- INSEE/Postal code: 73025 /73240
- ^{1} French Land Register data, which excludes lakes, ponds, glaciers > 1 km^{2} (0.386 sq mi or 247 acres) and river estuaries.

Avressieux (French pronunciation: [avʁɛsjø]; Arpitan: Avarcheû) is a commune in the Savoie department in the Auvergne-Rhône-Alpes region in south-eastern France.

== Toponymy ==
As with many polysyllabic Arpitan toponyms or anthroponyms, the final -x marks oxytonic stress (on the last syllable), whereas the final -z indicates paroxytonic stress (on the penultimate syllable) and should not be pronounced, although in French it is often mispronounced due to hypercorrection.

== See also ==
- Communes of the Savoie department
