= Saint-Genix-les-Villages =

- Commune
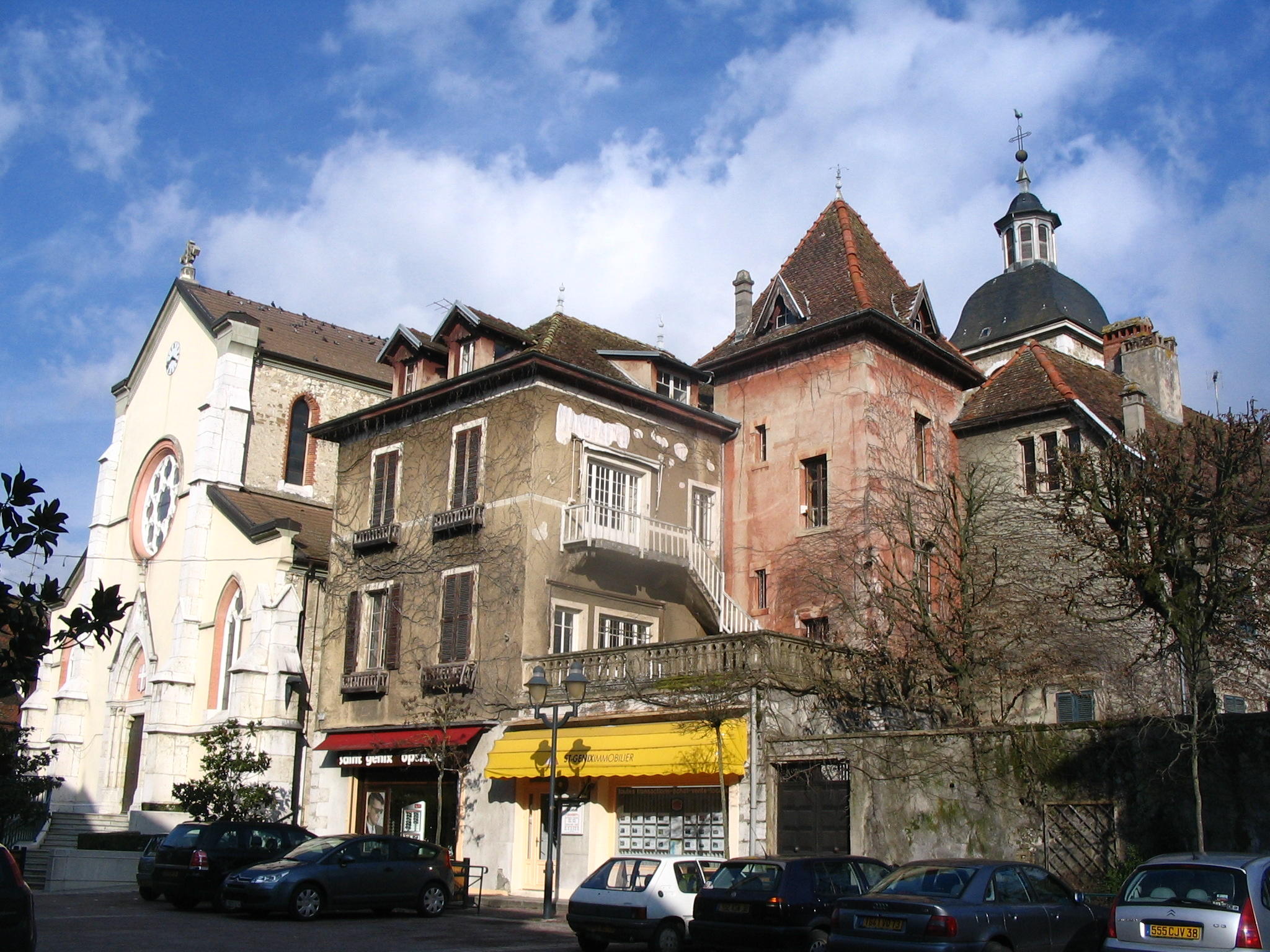
- The church square in Saint-Genix-sur-Guiers
- Location of Saint-Genix-les-Villages
- Location within France Location within Auvergne-Rhône-Alpes
- Coordinates: 45°36′05″N 5°38′07″E
- Country: France
- Region: Auvergne-Rhône-Alpes
- Department: Savoie
- Arrondissement: Chambéry
- Canton: Bugey savoyard
- Intercommunality: Val Guiers

Government
  - Mayor (2020–2026): Jean-Claude Paravy
- Area^{1}: 25.45 km^{2} (9.83 sq mi)
- Highest elevation: 880 m (2,890 ft)
- Lowest elevation: 208 m (682 ft)
- Population (2023): 3,095
  - Density: 121.6/km^{2} (315.0/sq mi)
- Time zone: UTC+01:00 (CET)
  - Summer (DST): UTC+02:00 (CEST)
- INSEE/Postal code: 73236 /73240
- Website: saint-genix-sur-guiers.net
- ^{1} French Land Register data, which excludes lakes, ponds, glaciers > 1 km^{2} (0.386 sq mi or 247 acres) and river estuaries.

Saint-Genix-les-Villages is a commune in the Savoie department in the Auvergne-Rhône-Alpes region in south-eastern France. It was established on 1 January 2019 by merger of the former communes of Saint-Genix-sur-Guiers (the seat), Gresin and Saint-Maurice-de-Rotherens.

== Population ==
Population data refer to the area corresponding with the commune as of January 2025.

Historical population
Year	Pop.	±% p.a.
1968	1,965	—
1975	1,955	−0.07%
1982	2,036	+0.58%
1990	2,133	+0.58%
1999	2,246	+0.58%
2007	2,635	+2.02%
2012	2,886	+1.84%
2017	2,944	+0.40%
2023	3,095	+0.84%
Source: INSEE

== See also ==
- Communes of the Savoie department
