= La Balme =

- Commune
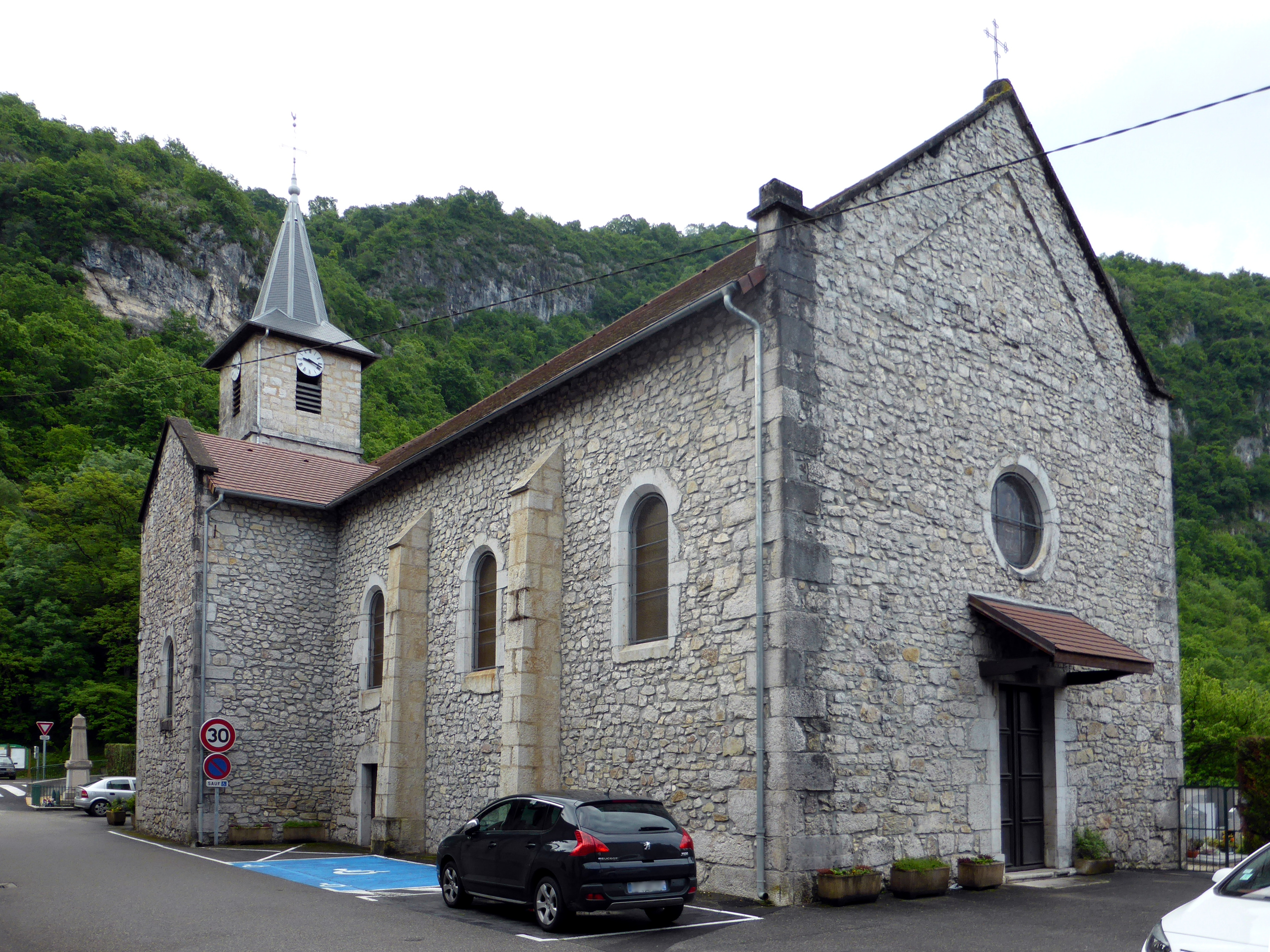
- Town church
- Location of La Balme
- Location within France Location within Auvergne-Rhône-Alpes
- Coordinates: 45°42′19″N 5°43′07″E
- Country: France
- Region: Auvergne-Rhône-Alpes
- Department: Savoie
- Arrondissement: Chambéry
- Canton: Bugey savoyard
- Intercommunality: Yenne

Government
  - Mayor (2020–2026): Martine Gojon
- Area^{1}: 9.4 km^{2} (3.6 sq mi)
- Highest elevation: 689 m (2,260 ft)
- Lowest elevation: 210 m (690 ft)
- Population (2023): 360
  - Density: 38/km^{2} (99/sq mi)
- Time zone: UTC+01:00 (CET)
  - Summer (DST): UTC+02:00 (CEST)
- INSEE/Postal code: 73028 /73170
- ^{1} French Land Register data, which excludes lakes, ponds, glaciers > 1 km^{2} (0.386 sq mi or 247 acres) and river estuaries.

La Balme (French pronunciation: [la balm]; Arpitan: La Borma) is a commune of the Savoie department in the Auvergne-Rhône-Alpes region of southeastern France.

== See also ==
- Communes of the Savoie department
