= Marcieux =

Marcieux Marcheu (Savoyard)
- Commune
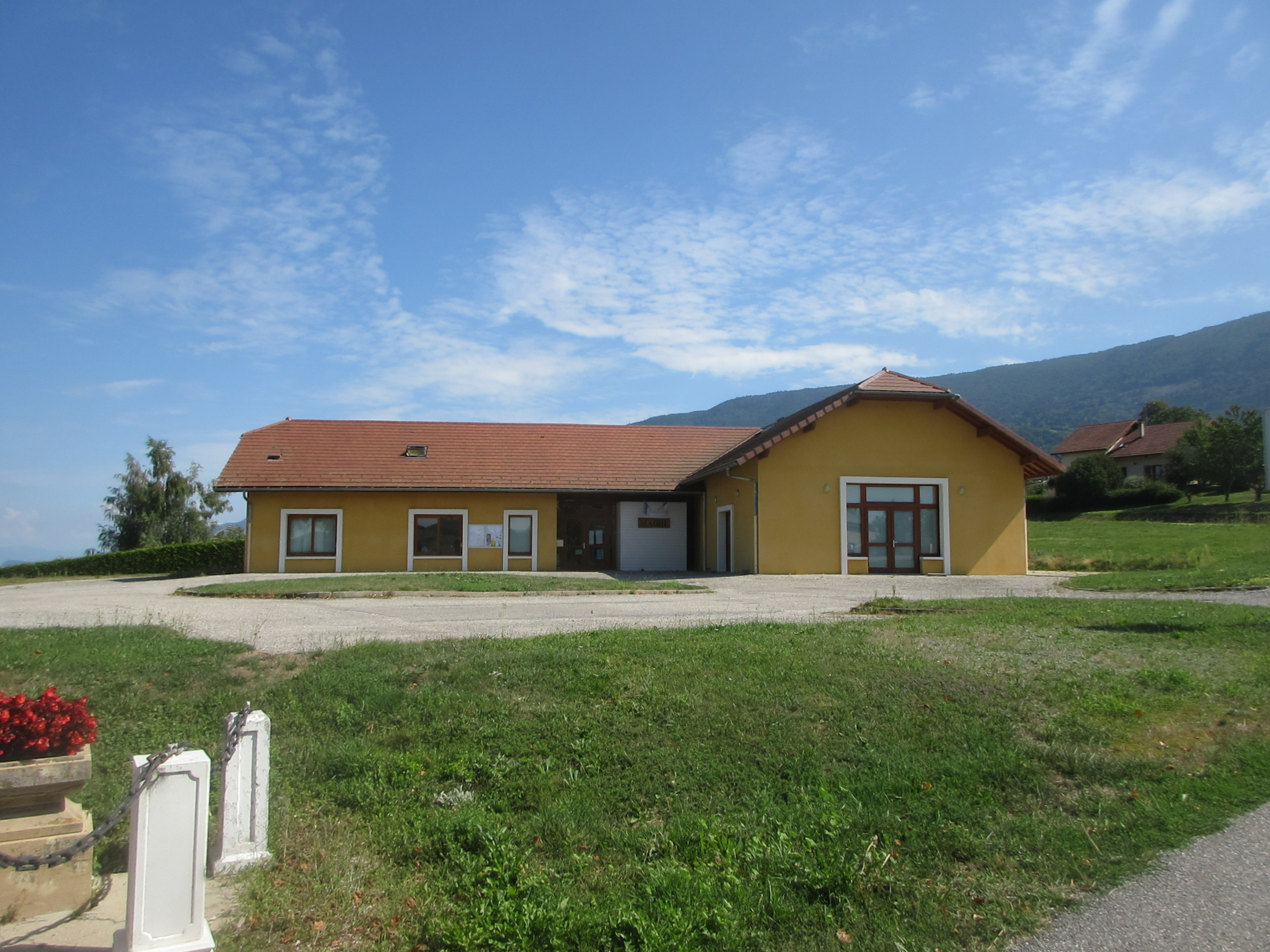
- Town hall
- Location of Marcieux
- Location within France Location within Auvergne-Rhône-Alpes
- Coordinates: 45°36′50″N 5°45′47″E
- Country: France
- Region: Auvergne-Rhône-Alpes
- Department: Savoie
- Arrondissement: Chambéry
- Canton: Bugey savoyard
- Intercommunality: lac d'Aiguebelette

Government
  - Mayor (2020–2026): Pascal Zucchero
- Area^{1}: 4.4 km^{2} (1.7 sq mi)
- Highest elevation: 1,434 m (4,705 ft)
- Lowest elevation: 400 m (1,300 ft)
- Population (2023): 240
  - Density: 55/km^{2} (140/sq mi)
- Time zone: UTC+01:00 (CET)
  - Summer (DST): UTC+02:00 (CEST)
- INSEE/Postal code: 73152 /73470
- ^{1} French Land Register data, which excludes lakes, ponds, glaciers > 1 km^{2} (0.386 sq mi or 247 acres) and river estuaries.

Marcieux (French pronunciation: [maʁsjø]; Savoyard: Marcheu) is a commune in the Savoie department in the Auvergne-Rhône-Alpes region in south-eastern France.

== See also ==
- Communes of the Savoie department
