= Champagneux =

Champagneux Shanpanyeû (Savoyard)
- Commune
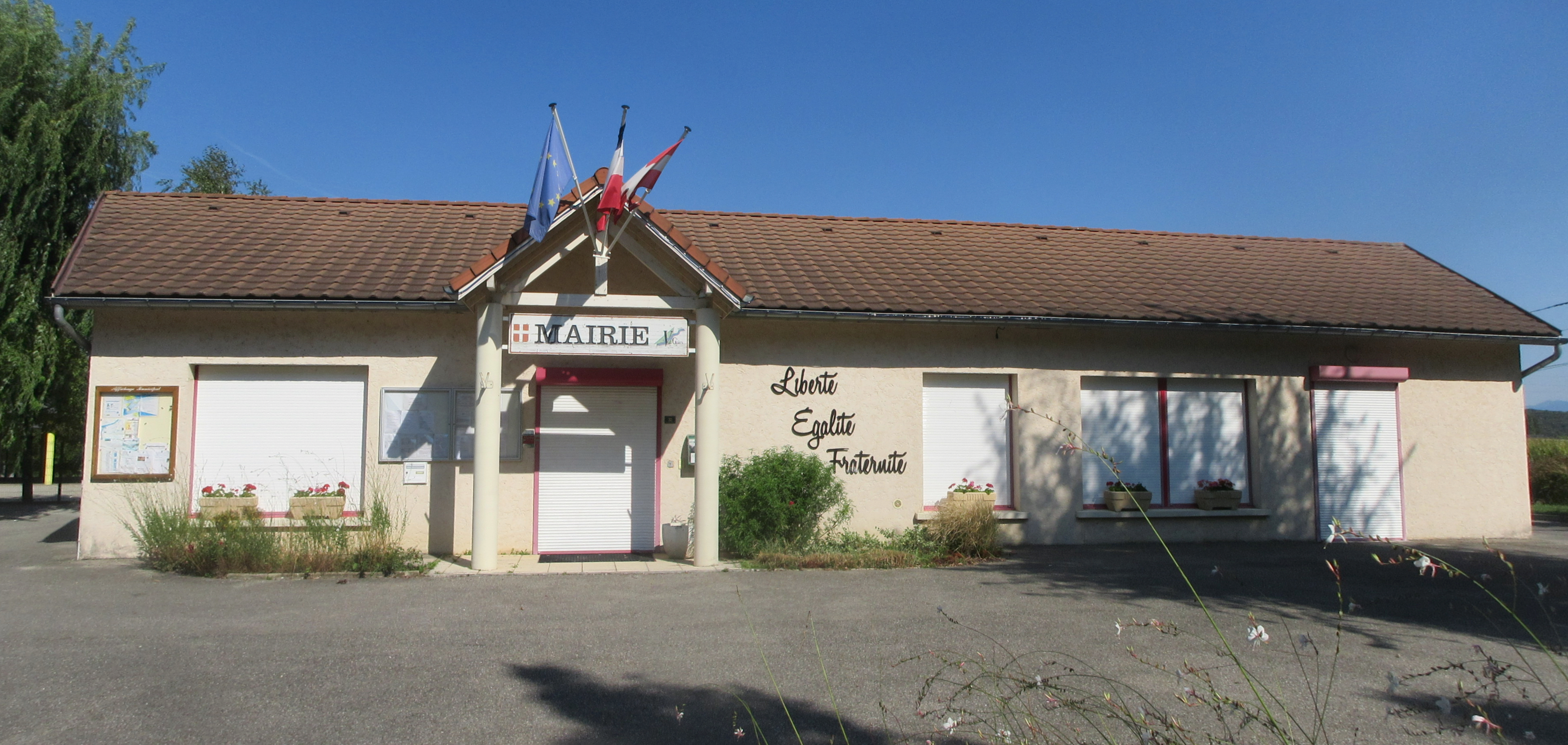
- Location of Champagneux
- Location within France Location within Auvergne-Rhône-Alpes
- Coordinates: 45°37′28″N 5°40′29″E
- Country: France
- Region: Auvergne-Rhône-Alpes
- Department: Savoie
- Arrondissement: Chambéry
- Canton: Bugey savoyard
- Intercommunality: Val Guiers

Government
  - Mayor (2020–2026): Georges Cagnin
- Area^{1}: 10.68 km^{2} (4.12 sq mi)
- Highest elevation: 820 m (2,690 ft)
- Lowest elevation: 207 m (679 ft)
- Population (2023): 675
  - Density: 63.2/km^{2} (164/sq mi)
- Time zone: UTC+01:00 (CET)
  - Summer (DST): UTC+02:00 (CEST)
- INSEE/Postal code: 73070 /73240
- ^{1} French Land Register data, which excludes lakes, ponds, glaciers > 1 km^{2} (0.386 sq mi or 247 acres) and river estuaries.

Champagneux (Savoyard: Shanpanyeû) is a commune in the Savoie department in the Auvergne-Rhône-Alpes region in south-eastern France.

== Population ==
Historical population
Year	Pop.	±% p.a.
1968	366	—
1975	303	−2.66%
1982	346	+1.91%
1990	327	−0.70%
1999	379	+1.65%
2007	500	+3.52%
2012	654	+5.52%
2017	688	+1.02%
2023	675	−0.32%
Source: INSEE

== See also ==
- Communes of the Savoie department
