= Chindrieux station =

Railway station in Chindrieux, France

Chindrieux
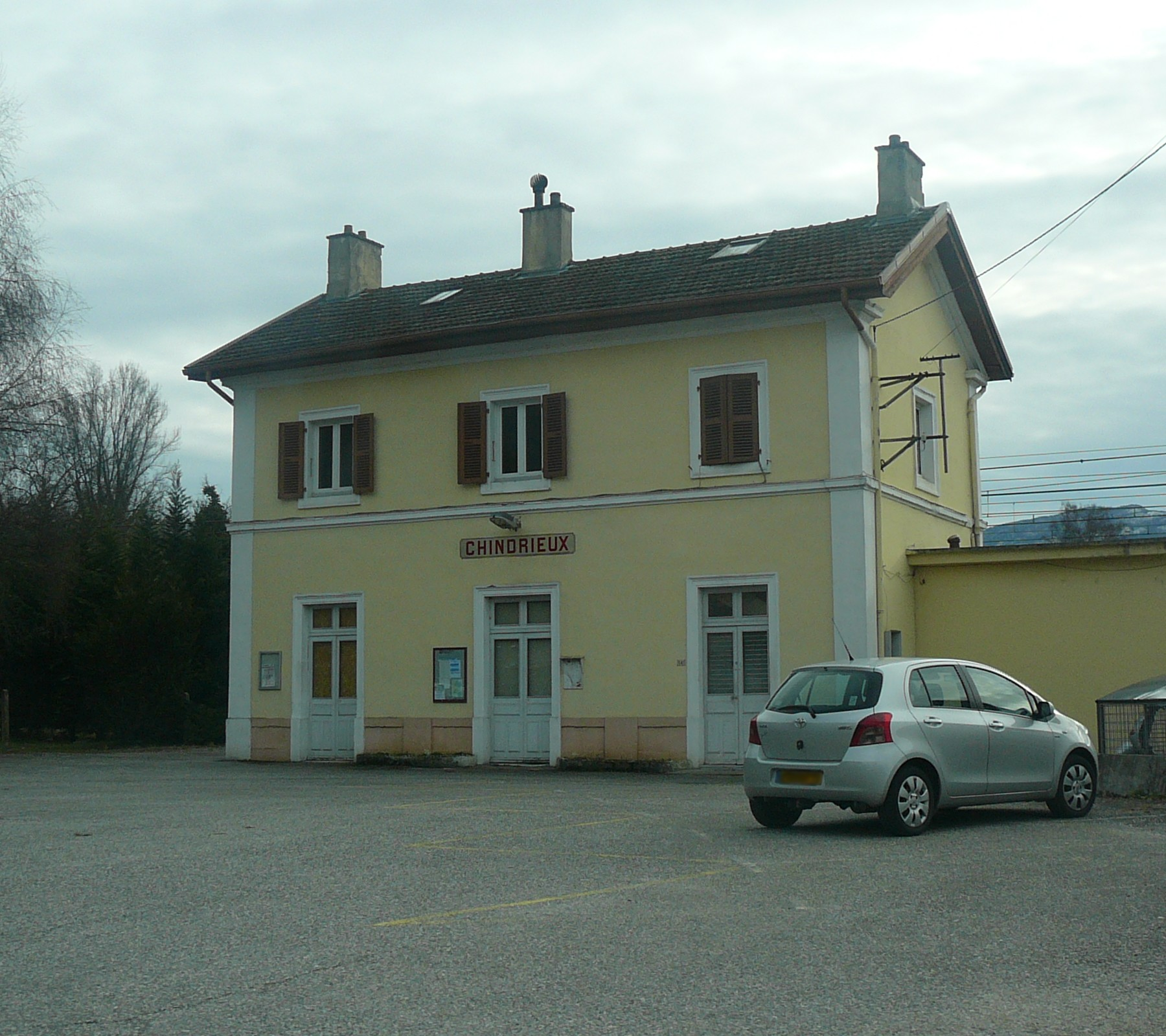
- Chindrieux railway station

General information
- Location: Chindrieux, Savoie, Auvergne-Rhône-Alpes, France
- Coordinates: 45°48′12″N 5°50′49″E
- Line: Culoz–Modane railway
- Platforms: 2

Other information
- Station code: 87741116

History
- Opened: 1858

Passengers
- 33,913 (2023)
Services
Preceding station	TER Auvergne-Rhône-Alpes	Following station
Aix-les-Bains-Le Revard towards Chambéry	51	Vions–Chanaz towards Geneva
Location

Chindrieux station (French: Gare de Chindrieux) is a railway station located in Chindrieux, Savoie, south-eastern France. The station was opened in 1858 and is located on the Culoz–Modane railway. The train services are operated by SNCF.

== Train services ==
The following services call at Chindrieux As of 2024:

- Regional services (TER Auvergne-Rhône-Alpes) Geneva - Bellegarde - Aix-les-Bains - Chambéry - Grenoble
