= Saint-Pierre-d'Alvey =

Saint-Pierre-d'Alvey San Pyérè (Savoyard)
- Commune
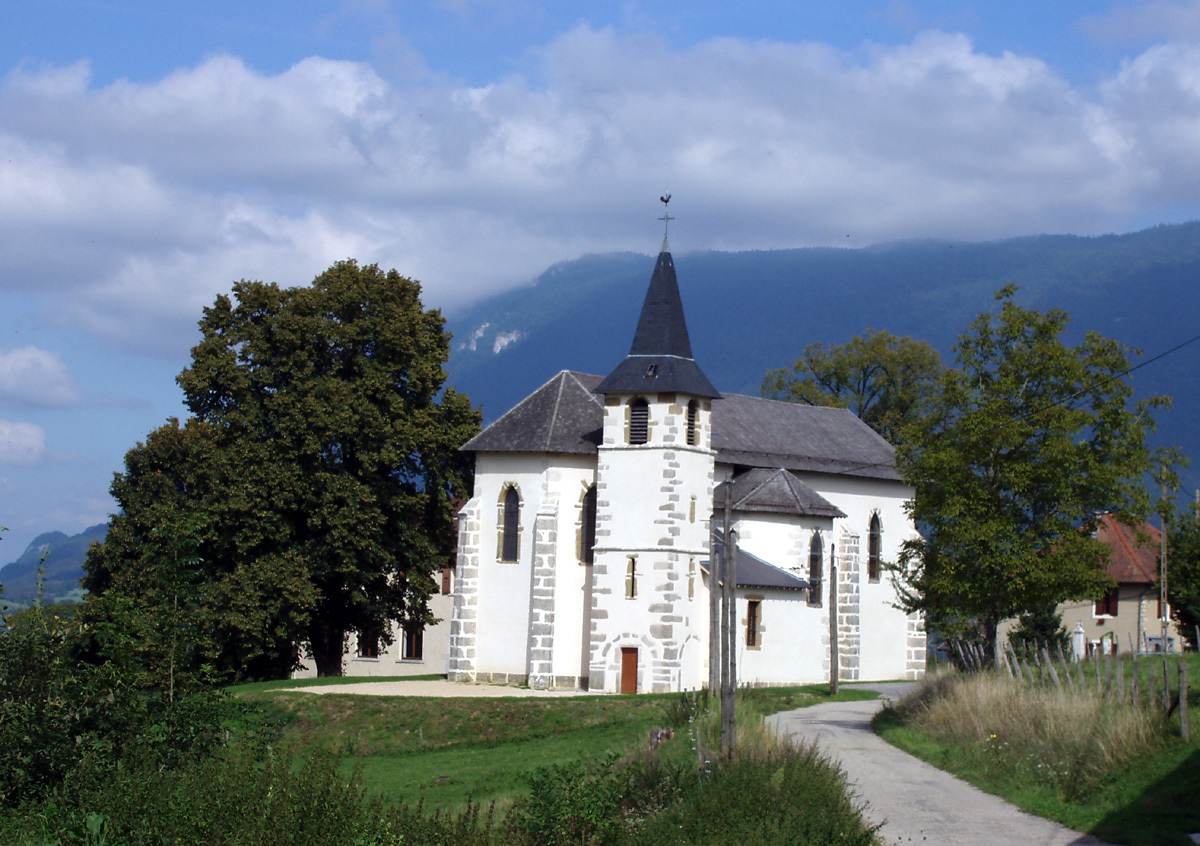
- The church in Saint-Pierre-d'Alvey
- Location of Saint-Pierre-d'Alvey
- Location within France Location within Auvergne-Rhône-Alpes
- Coordinates: 45°37′51″N 5°44′36″E
- Country: France
- Region: Auvergne-Rhône-Alpes
- Department: Savoie
- Arrondissement: Chambéry
- Canton: Bugey savoyard
- Intercommunality: Yenne

Government
  - Mayor (2020–2026): Jean-François Hébrard
- Area^{1}: 7.7 km^{2} (3.0 sq mi)
- Highest elevation: 860 m (2,820 ft)
- Lowest elevation: 410 m (1,350 ft)
- Population (2023): 305
  - Density: 40/km^{2} (100/sq mi)
- Time zone: UTC+01:00 (CET)
  - Summer (DST): UTC+02:00 (CEST)
- INSEE/Postal code: 73271 /73170
- Website: www.stpierredalvey.fr
- ^{1} French Land Register data, which excludes lakes, ponds, glaciers > 1 km^{2} (0.386 sq mi or 247 acres) and river estuaries.

Saint-Pierre-d'Alvey (French pronunciation: [sɛ̃ pjɛʁ dalvɛ]; Savoyard: San Pyérè) is a commune in the Savoie department in the Auvergne-Rhône-Alpes region in south-eastern France.

== See also ==
- Communes of the Savoie department
