= Gresin =

Gresin Grazin (Savoyard)
- Part of Saint-Genix-les-Villages
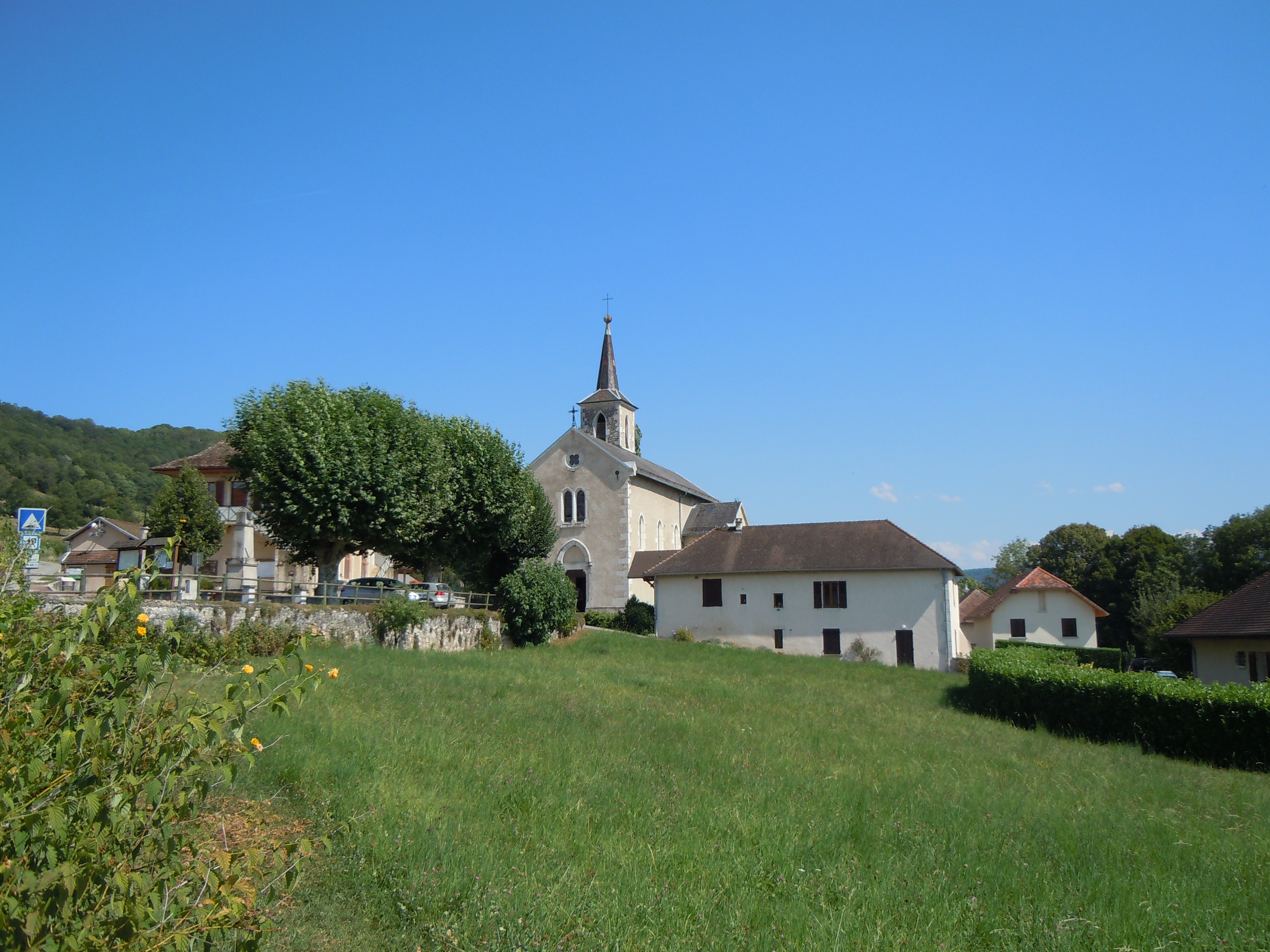
- The church and town hall in Gresin
- Location of Gresin
- Location within France Location within Auvergne-Rhône-Alpes
- Coordinates: 45°36′39″N 5°41′00″E
- Country: France
- Region: Auvergne-Rhône-Alpes
- Department: Savoie
- Arrondissement: Chambéry
- Canton: Bugey savoyard
- Commune: Saint-Genix-les-Villages
- Area^{1}: 5.01 km^{2} (1.93 sq mi)
- Highest elevation: 730 m (2,400 ft)
- Lowest elevation: 238 m (781 ft)
- Population (2022): 376
  - Density: 75.0/km^{2} (194/sq mi)
- Time zone: UTC+01:00 (CET)
  - Summer (DST): UTC+02:00 (CEST)
- Postal code: 73240
- ^{1} French Land Register data, which excludes lakes, ponds, glaciers > 1 km^{2} (0.386 sq mi or 247 acres) and river estuaries.

Gresin (Savoyard: Grazin) is a former commune in the Savoie department in the Auvergne-Rhône-Alpes region in south-eastern France. On 1 January 2019, it was merged into the new commune Saint-Genix-les-Villages.

== See also ==
- Grésin plaque
- Communes of the Savoie department
