= Chindrieux =

Chindrieux Shindro (Arpitan)
- Commune
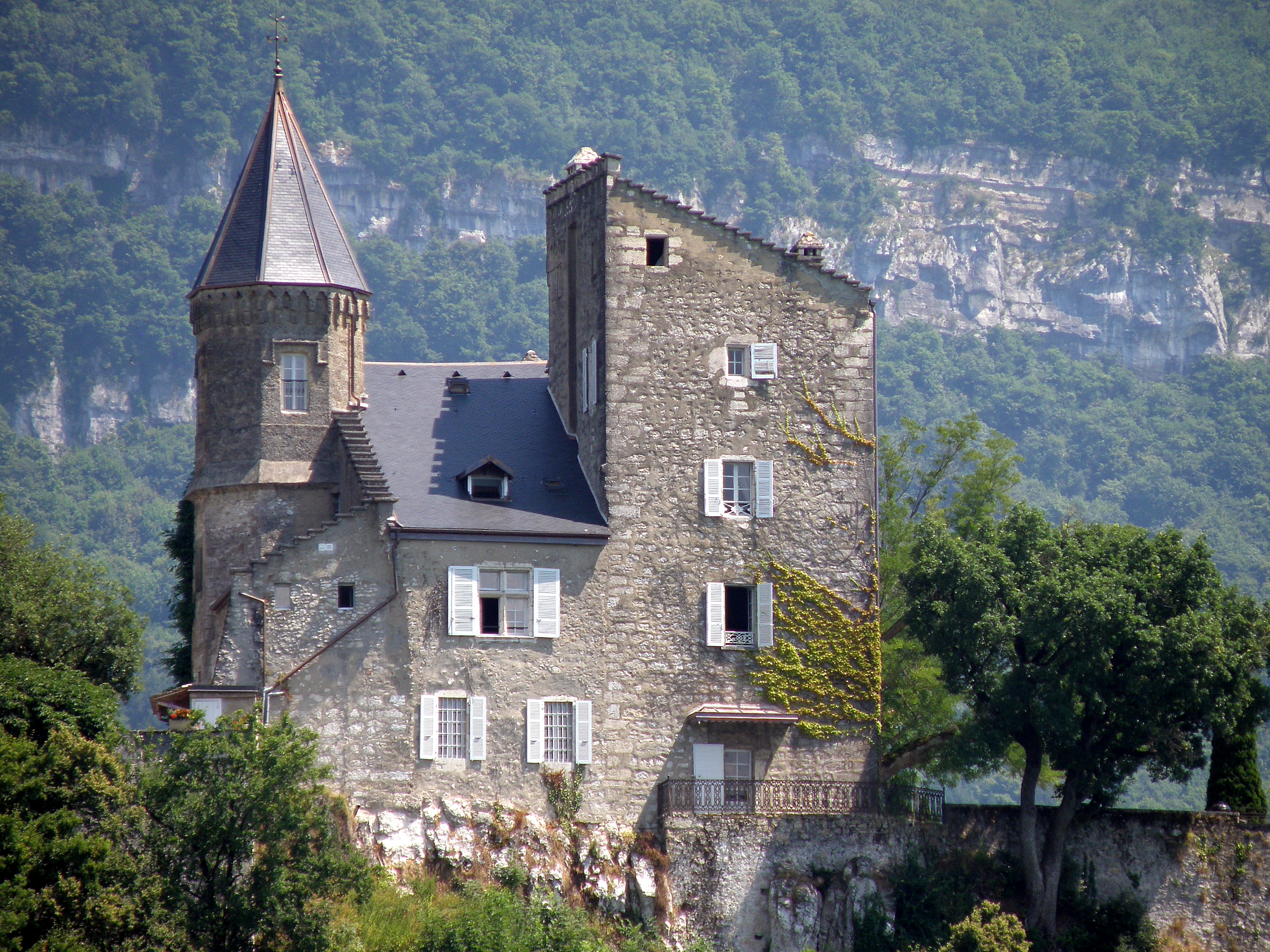
- The Château de Châtillon, in Chindrieux

- Coat of arms
- Location of Chindrieux
- Location within France Location within Auvergne-Rhône-Alpes
- Coordinates: 45°49′18″N 5°51′00″E
- Country: France
- Region: Auvergne-Rhône-Alpes
- Department: Savoie
- Arrondissement: Chambéry
- Canton: Bugey savoyard
- Intercommunality: CA Grand Lac

Government
  - Mayor (2020–2026): Marie-Claire Barbier
- Area^{1}: 16.42 km^{2} (6.34 sq mi)
- Elevation: 284 m (932 ft)
- Highest elevation: 900 m (3,000 ft)
- Lowest elevation: 227 m (745 ft)
- Population (2023): 1,531
  - Density: 93.24/km^{2} (241.5/sq mi)
- Time zone: UTC+01:00 (CET)
  - Summer (DST): UTC+02:00 (CEST)
- INSEE/Postal code: 73085 /73310
- ^{1} French Land Register data, which excludes lakes, ponds, glaciers > 1 km^{2} (0.386 sq mi or 247 acres) and river estuaries.

Chindrieux (French pronunciation: [ʃɛ̃dʁijø]; Arpitan: Shindro) is commune in the Savoie department in the Auvergne-Rhône-Alpes region in south-eastern France.

It lies near Lake Bourget.

== Geography ==
=== World Heritage Site ===
It is home to one or more prehistoric pile-dwelling (or stilt house) settlements that are part of the Prehistoric Pile dwellings around the Alps UNESCO World Heritage Site.

=== Climate ===
Chindrieux has an oceanic climate (Köppen climate classification Cfb) closely bordering on a humid subtropical climate (Cfa). The average annual temperature in Chindrieux is 11.9 °C (53.4 °F). The average annual rainfall is 1,233.9 mm (48.58 in) with October as the wettest month. The temperatures are highest on average in July, at around 21.6 °C (70.9 °F), and lowest in January, at around 2.6 °C (36.7 °F). The highest temperature ever recorded in Chindrieux was 40.7 °C (105.3 °F) on 12 August 2003; the coldest temperature ever recorded was −19.5 °C (−3.1 °F) on 7 January 1985.

Climate data for Chindrieux (1981−2010 normals, extremes 1982−2015)
Month	Jan	Feb	Mar	Apr	May	Jun	Jul	Aug	Sep	Oct	Nov	Dec	Year
Record high °C (°F)	16.9 (62.4)	20.2 (68.4)	25.4 (77.7)	29.0 (84.2)	33.0 (91.4)	36.5 (97.7)	37.6 (99.7)	40.7 (105.3)	31.8 (89.2)	27.2 (81.0)	21.5 (70.7)	21.5 (70.7)	40.7 (105.3)
Mean daily maximum °C (°F)	5.8 (42.4)	8.0 (46.4)	12.8 (55.0)	16.3 (61.3)	21.0 (69.8)	24.6 (76.3)	27.5 (81.5)	26.7 (80.1)	22.1 (71.8)	17.0 (62.6)	10.1 (50.2)	6.3 (43.3)	16.6 (61.9)
Daily mean °C (°F)	2.6 (36.7)	4.2 (39.6)	7.9 (46.2)	11.1 (52.0)	15.6 (60.1)	19.0 (66.2)	21.6 (70.9)	20.9 (69.6)	17.1 (62.8)	12.8 (55.0)	6.7 (44.1)	3.4 (38.1)	11.9 (53.4)
Mean daily minimum °C (°F)	−0.6 (30.9)	0.3 (32.5)	3.0 (37.4)	5.9 (42.6)	10.2 (50.4)	13.3 (55.9)	15.6 (60.1)	15.1 (59.2)	12.0 (53.6)	8.6 (47.5)	3.4 (38.1)	0.5 (32.9)	7.3 (45.1)
Record low °C (°F)	−19.5 (−3.1)	−11.9 (10.6)	−9.3 (15.3)	−3.6 (25.5)	−1.2 (29.8)	4.0 (39.2)	6.7 (44.1)	5.3 (41.5)	2.0 (35.6)	−3.0 (26.6)	−7.0 (19.4)	−11.1 (12.0)	−19.5 (−3.1)
Average precipitation mm (inches)	95.6 (3.76)	89.6 (3.53)	93.4 (3.68)	96.5 (3.80)	102.9 (4.05)	100.9 (3.97)	78.5 (3.09)	93.6 (3.69)	118.6 (4.67)	130.7 (5.15)	122.1 (4.81)	111.5 (4.39)	1,233.9 (48.58)
Average precipitation days (≥ 1.0 mm)	10.6	9.3	9.9	10.9	11.4	9.9	7.6	8.9	8.3	11.5	11.2	10.9	120.3
Source: Météo-France

== See also ==
- Communes of the Savoie department
- Chindrieux station
