= Verthemex =

Verthemex Vartèmé (Savoyard)
- Commune
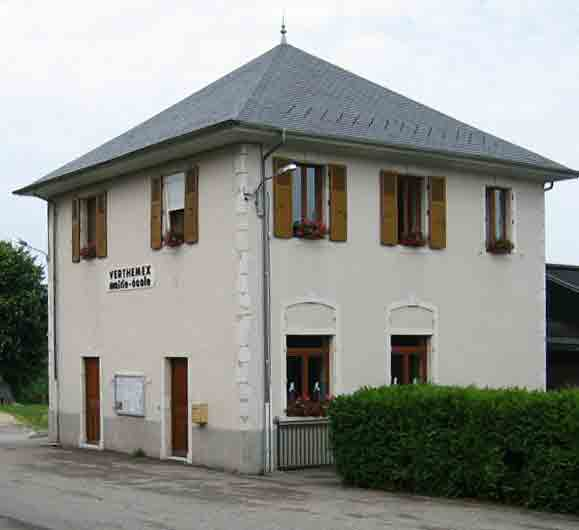
- The town hall in Verthemex
- Location of Verthemex
- Location within France Location within Auvergne-Rhône-Alpes
- Coordinates: 45°38′N 5°47′E
- Country: France
- Region: Auvergne-Rhône-Alpes
- Department: Savoie
- Arrondissement: Chambéry
- Canton: Bugey savoyard
- Intercommunality: Yenne

Government
  - Mayor (2020–2026): Éric Perriand
- Area^{1}: 9.28 km^{2} (3.58 sq mi)
- Elevation: 640 m (2,100 ft)
- Highest elevation: 1,467 m (4,813 ft)
- Lowest elevation: 410 m (1,350 ft)
- Population (2023): 244
  - Density: 26.3/km^{2} (68.1/sq mi)
- Time zone: UTC+01:00 (CET)
  - Summer (DST): UTC+02:00 (CEST)
- INSEE/Postal code: 73313 /73170
- ^{1} French Land Register data, which excludes lakes, ponds, glaciers > 1 km^{2} (0.386 sq mi or 247 acres) and river estuaries.

Verthemex (French pronunciation: [vɛʁtəmɛks]; Savoyard: Vartèmé) is a commune in the Savoie department in the Auvergne-Rhône-Alpes region in south-eastern France.

== See also ==
- Communes of the Savoie department
