= Vions =

Vions Vyon (Savoyard)
- Commune
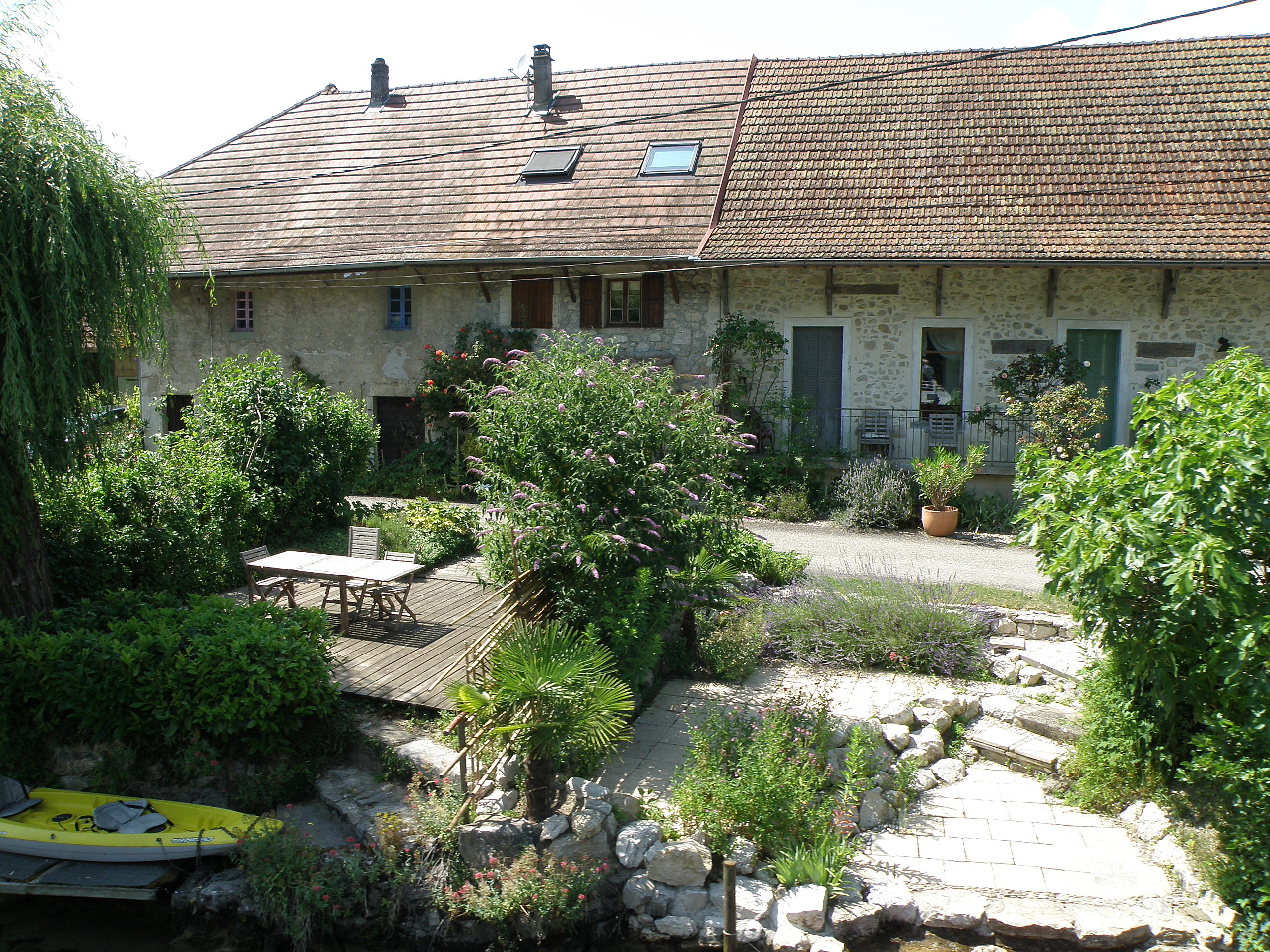
- The hamlet of Les Granges, in Vions
- Location of Vions
- Location within France Location within Auvergne-Rhône-Alpes
- Coordinates: 45°49′31″N 5°48′27″E
- Country: France
- Region: Auvergne-Rhône-Alpes
- Department: Savoie
- Arrondissement: Chambéry
- Canton: Bugey savoyard
- Intercommunality: CA Grand Lac

Government
  - Mayor (2023–2026): Manuel Arragain
- Area^{1}: 3.7 km^{2} (1.4 sq mi)
- Highest elevation: 397 m (1,302 ft)
- Lowest elevation: 224 m (735 ft)
- Population (2023): 425
  - Density: 110/km^{2} (300/sq mi)
- Time zone: UTC+01:00 (CET)
  - Summer (DST): UTC+02:00 (CEST)
- INSEE/Postal code: 73327 /73310
- ^{1} French Land Register data, which excludes lakes, ponds, glaciers > 1 km^{2} (0.386 sq mi or 247 acres) and river estuaries.

Vions (Savoyard: Vyon) is a commune in the Savoie department in the Auvergne-Rhône-Alpes region in south-eastern France.

== See also ==
- Communes of the Savoie department
- Vions-Chanaz station
