= La Chapelle-Saint-Martin =

- Commune
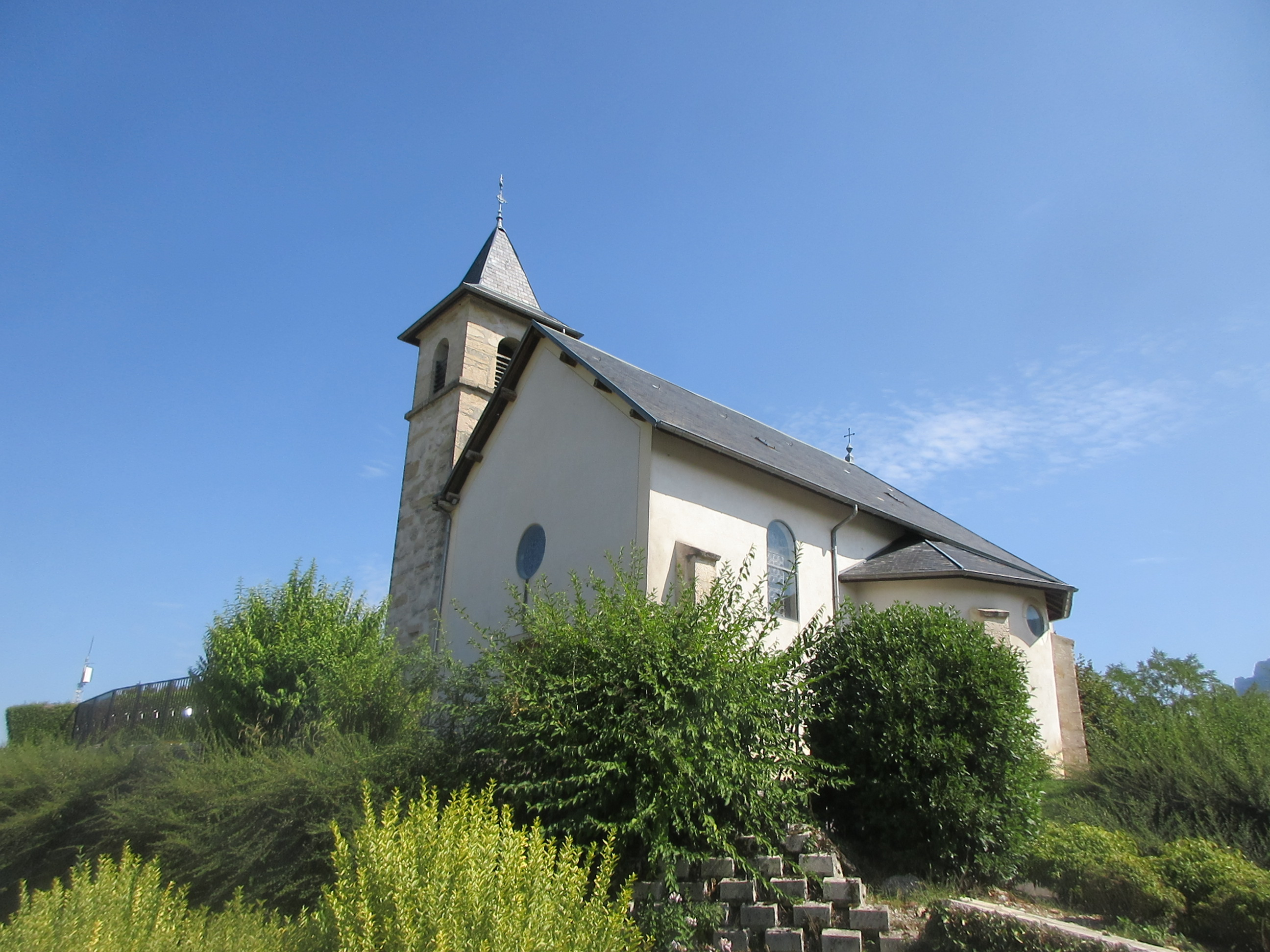
- Saint-Martin church
- Location of La Chapelle-Saint-Martin
- Location within France Location within Auvergne-Rhône-Alpes
- Coordinates: 45°38′53″N 5°45′29″E
- Country: France
- Region: Auvergne-Rhône-Alpes
- Department: Savoie
- Arrondissement: Chambéry
- Canton: Bugey savoyard
- Intercommunality: Yenne

Government
  - Mayor (2020–2026): Julien Blanchin
- Area^{1}: 2.57 km^{2} (0.99 sq mi)
- Highest elevation: 521 m (1,709 ft)
- Lowest elevation: 315 m (1,033 ft)
- Population (2023): 150
  - Density: 58/km^{2} (150/sq mi)
- Time zone: UTC+01:00 (CET)
  - Summer (DST): UTC+02:00 (CEST)
- INSEE/Postal code: 73078 /73170
- ^{1} French Land Register data, which excludes lakes, ponds, glaciers > 1 km^{2} (0.386 sq mi or 247 acres) and river estuaries.

La Chapelle-Saint-Martin (French pronunciation: [la ʃapɛl sɛ̃ maʁtɛ̃]) is a commune in the Savoie department in the Auvergne-Rhône-Alpes region in south-eastern France.

== See also ==
- Communes of the Savoie department
