= Lucey, Savoie =

Lucey Luassa (Savoyard)
- Commune
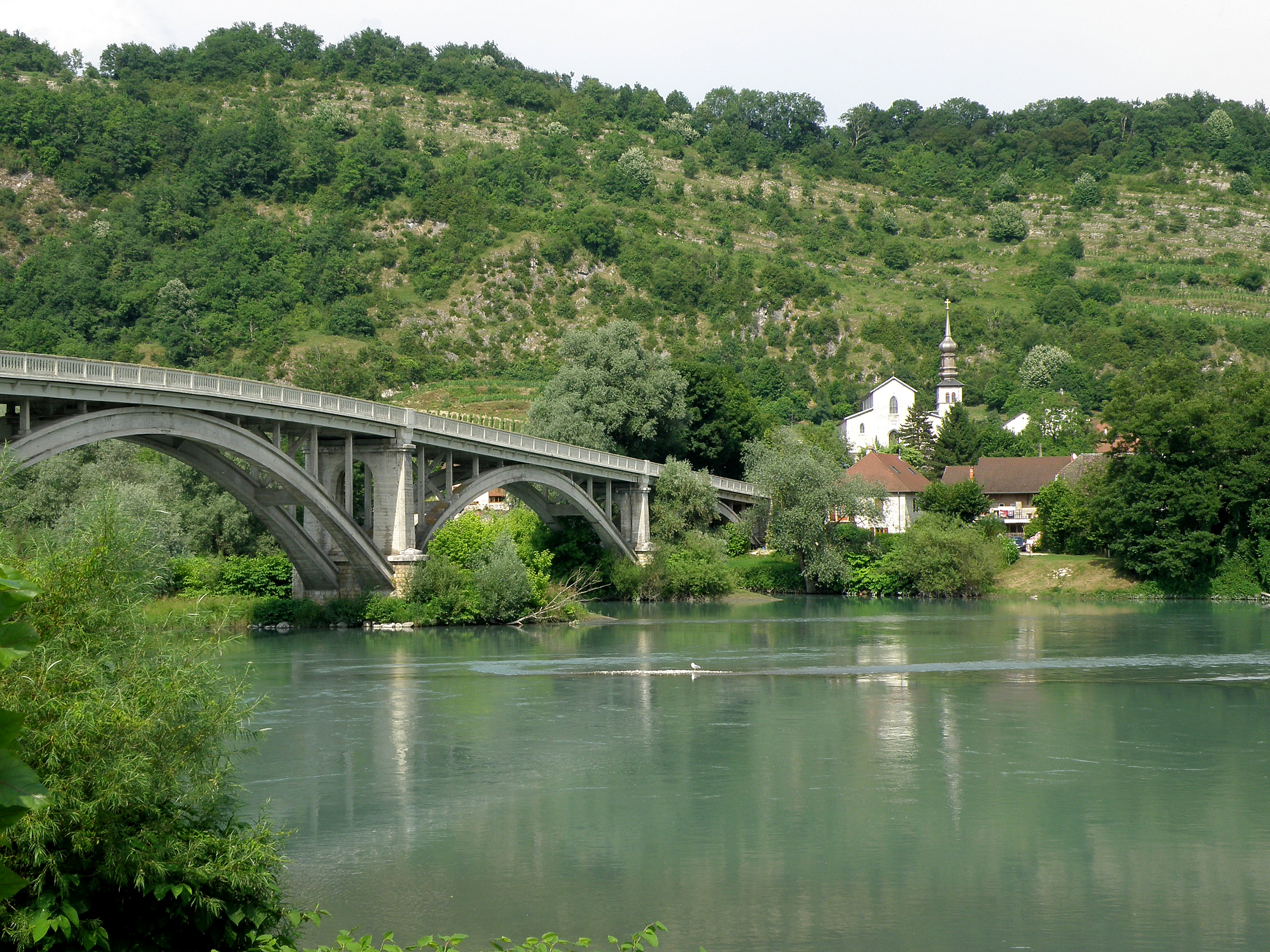
- The church and bridge over the Rhône, in Lucey
- Location of Lucey
- Location within France Location within Auvergne-Rhône-Alpes
- Coordinates: 45°45′10″N 5°47′15″E
- Country: France
- Region: Auvergne-Rhône-Alpes
- Department: Savoie
- Arrondissement: Chambéry
- Canton: Bugey savoyard
- Intercommunality: Yenne

Government
  - Mayor (2020–2026): Marie-Christine Bailet
- Area^{1}: 6.14 km^{2} (2.37 sq mi)
- Highest elevation: 660 m (2,170 ft)
- Lowest elevation: 220 m (720 ft)
- Population (2023): 286
  - Density: 46.6/km^{2} (121/sq mi)
- Time zone: UTC+01:00 (CET)
  - Summer (DST): UTC+02:00 (CEST)
- INSEE/Postal code: 73149 /73170
- ^{1} French Land Register data, which excludes lakes, ponds, glaciers > 1 km^{2} (0.386 sq mi or 247 acres) and river estuaries.

Lucey (French pronunciation: [lysɛ]; Savoyard: Luassa) is a commune in the Savoie department in the Auvergne-Rhône-Alpes region in south-eastern France.

== See also ==
- Communes of the Savoie department
