= Vions–Chanaz station =

Railway station in Vions, France

Vions–Chanaz
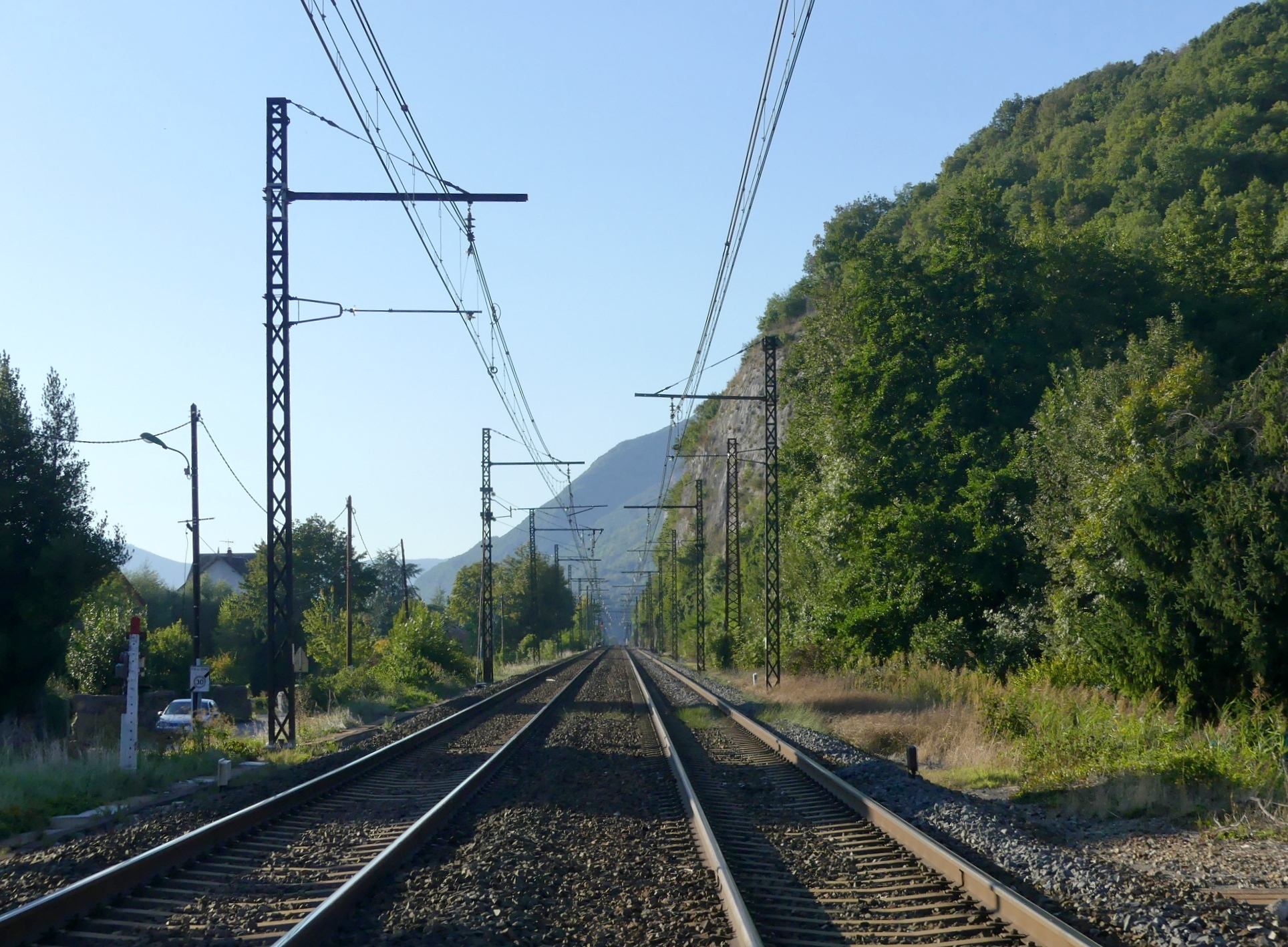
- Vions-Chanaz station

General information
- Location: Vions, Savoie, Auvergne-Rhône-Alpes, France
- Coordinates: 45°49′28″N 5°48′25″E
- Line: Culoz–Modane railway
- Platforms: 2

Other information
- Station code: 87741108

History
- Opened: 1858

Passengers
- 16,228 (2023)
Services
Preceding station	TER Auvergne-Rhône-Alpes	Following station
Chindrieux towards Chambéry	51	Culoz towards Geneva
Location

Vions–Chanaz station (French: Gare de Vions–Chanaz) is a railway station located in Vions, Savoie, south-eastern France. The station was opened in 1858 and is located on the Culoz–Modane railway. The train services are operated by SNCF.

== Train services ==
The following services call at Vions–Chanaz, as of 2024:

- Regional services (TER Auvergne-Rhône-Alpes) Geneva - Bellegarde - Aix-les-Bains - Chambéry - Grenoble

== See also ==
- List of SNCF stations in Auvergne-Rhône-Alpes
