= Rochefort, Savoie =

Rochefort Roshfô (Savoyard)
- Commune
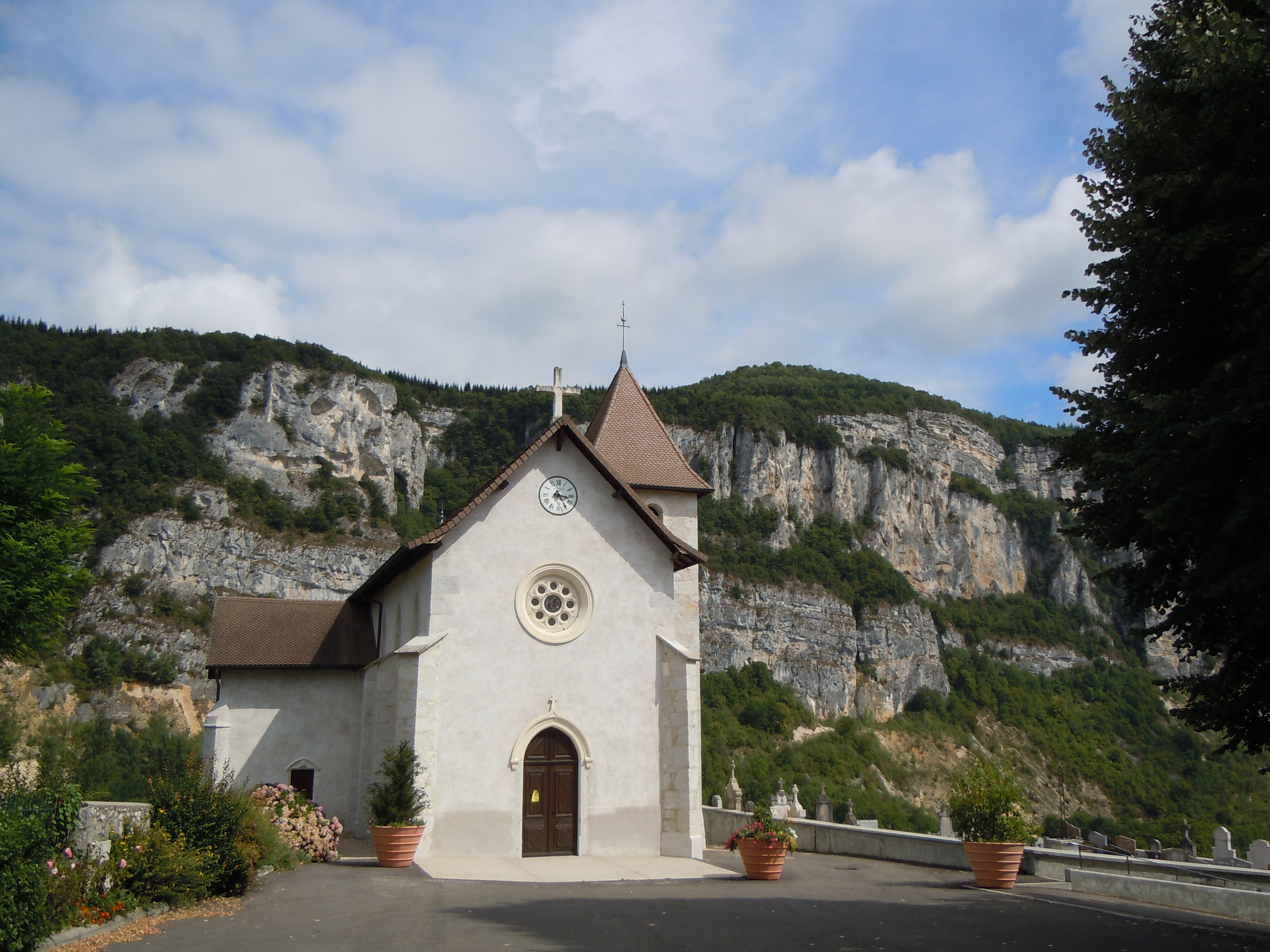
- The church in Rochefort
- Location of Rochefort
- Location within France Location within Auvergne-Rhône-Alpes
- Coordinates: 45°34′59″N 5°43′22″E
- Country: France
- Region: Auvergne-Rhône-Alpes
- Department: Savoie
- Arrondissement: Chambéry
- Canton: Bugey savoyard
- Intercommunality: Val Guiers

Government
  - Mayor (2020–2026): Yves Argoud
- Area^{1}: 5.6 km^{2} (2.2 sq mi)
- Highest elevation: 700 m (2,300 ft)
- Lowest elevation: 298 m (978 ft)
- Population (2023): 253
  - Density: 45/km^{2} (120/sq mi)
- Time zone: UTC+01:00 (CET)
  - Summer (DST): UTC+02:00 (CEST)
- INSEE/Postal code: 73214 /73240
- Website: www.commune-rochefort-savoie.org
- ^{1} French Land Register data, which excludes lakes, ponds, glaciers > 1 km^{2} (0.386 sq mi or 247 acres) and river estuaries.

Rochefort (French pronunciation: [ʁɔʃfɔʁ]; Savoyard: Roshfô) is a commune in the Savoie department in the Auvergne-Rhône-Alpes region in south-eastern France.

== See also ==
- Communes of the Savoie department
