= Sainte-Marie-d'Alvey =

Sainte-Marie-d'Alvey Sint Mari (Savoyard)
- Commune
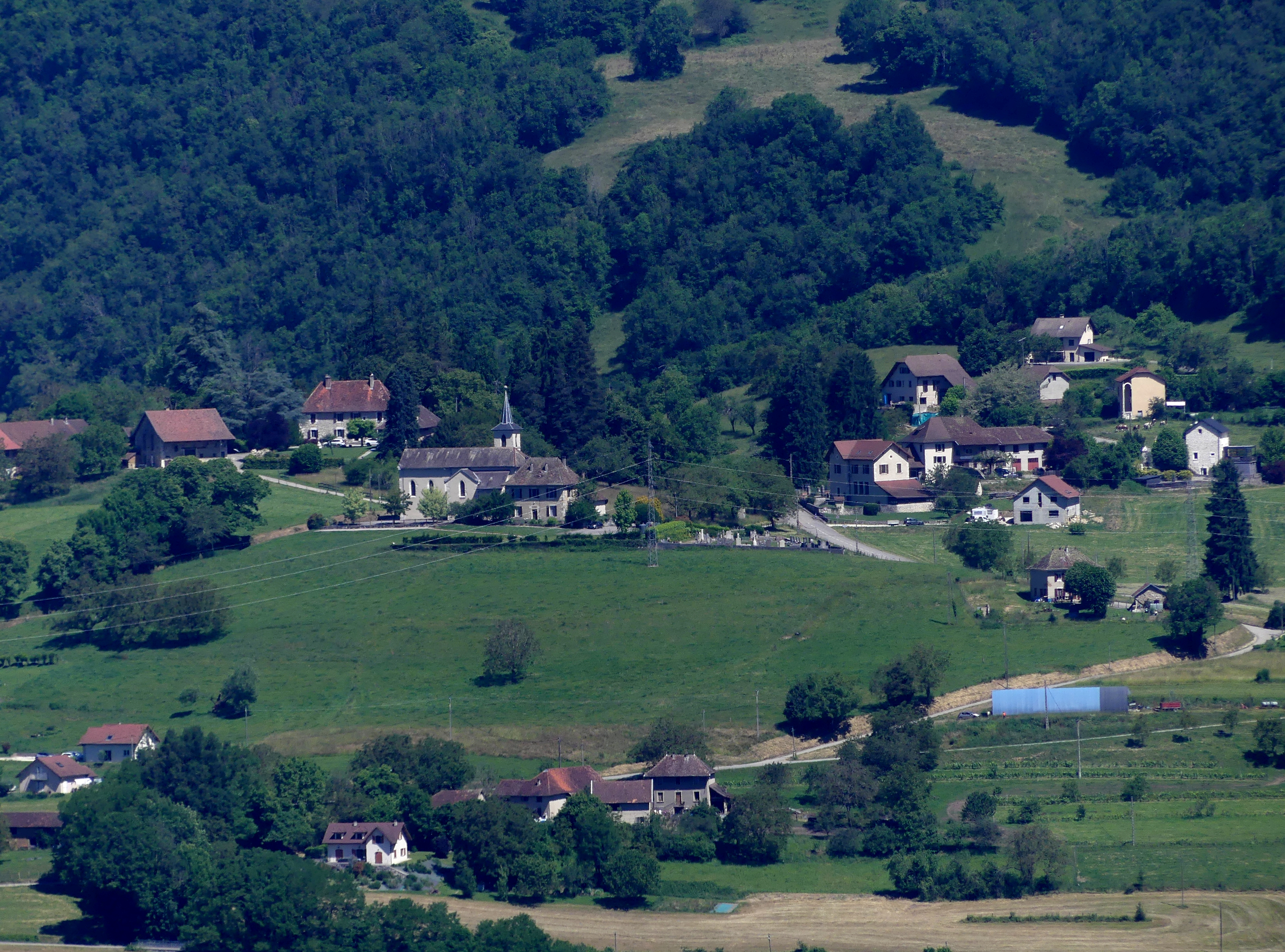
- Location of Sainte-Marie-d'Alvey
- Location within France Location within Auvergne-Rhône-Alpes
- Coordinates: 45°35′39″N 5°43′17″E
- Country: France
- Region: Auvergne-Rhône-Alpes
- Department: Savoie
- Arrondissement: Chambéry
- Canton: Bugey savoyard
- Intercommunality: Val Guiers

Government
  - Mayor (2020–2026): Philippe Person
- Area^{1}: 2.61 km^{2} (1.01 sq mi)
- Highest elevation: 705 m (2,313 ft)
- Lowest elevation: 326 m (1,070 ft)
- Population (2023): 133
  - Density: 51.0/km^{2} (132/sq mi)
- Time zone: UTC+01:00 (CET)
  - Summer (DST): UTC+02:00 (CEST)
- INSEE/Postal code: 73254 /73240
- ^{1} French Land Register data, which excludes lakes, ponds, glaciers > 1 km^{2} (0.386 sq mi or 247 acres) and river estuaries.

Sainte-Marie-d'Alvey (French pronunciation: [sɛ̃t maʁi dalvɛ]; Savoyard: Sint Mari) is a commune in the Savoie department in the Auvergne-Rhône-Alpes region in south-eastern France.

== See also ==
- Communes of the Savoie department
