= Jongieux =

Jongieux Zhondzeu (Arpitan)
- Commune
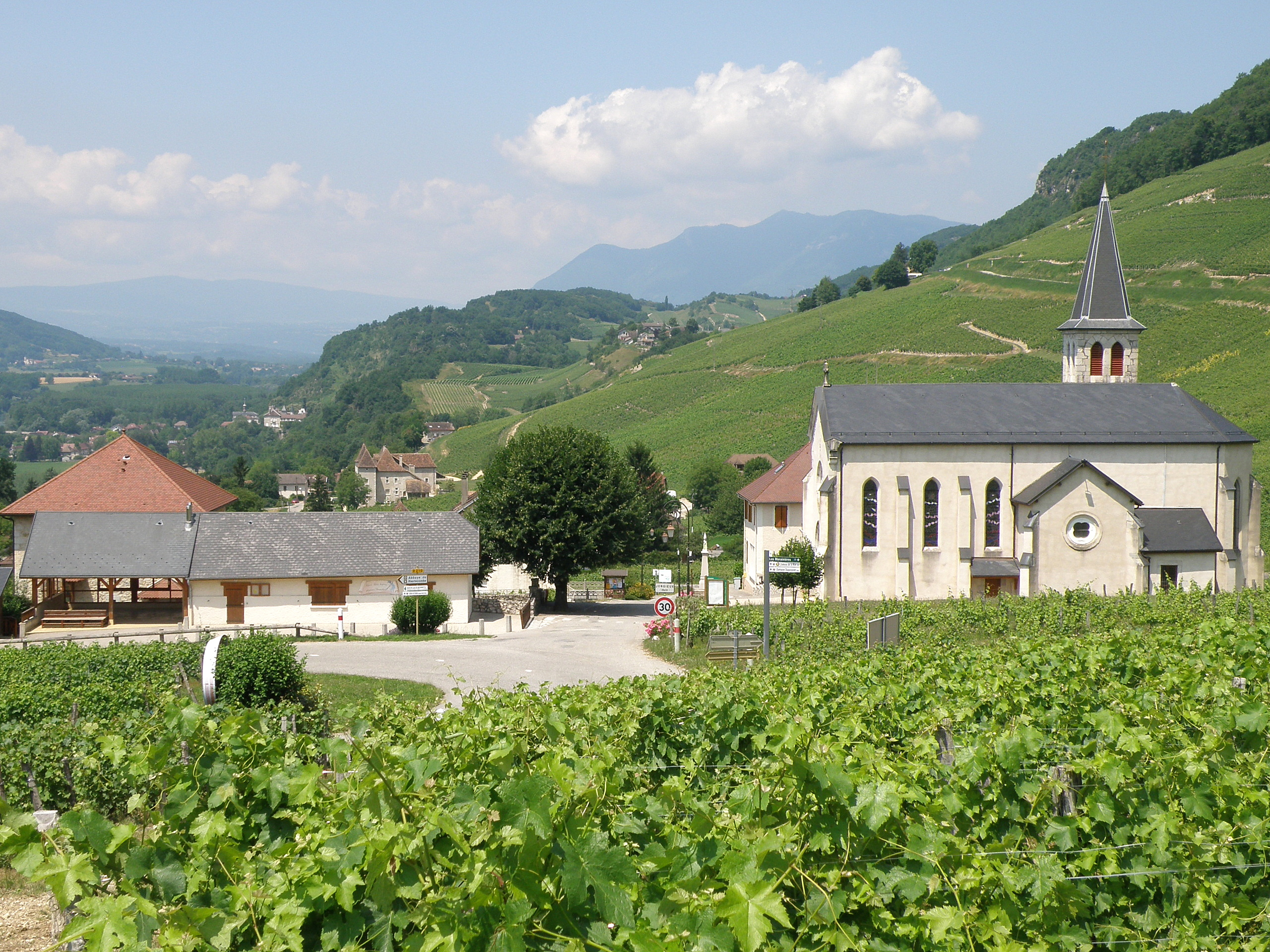
- A general view of Jongieux
- Location of Jongieux
- Location within France Location within Auvergne-Rhône-Alpes
- Coordinates: 45°44′23″N 5°47′57″E
- Country: France
- Region: Auvergne-Rhône-Alpes
- Department: Savoie
- Arrondissement: Chambéry
- Canton: Bugey savoyard
- Intercommunality: Yenne

Government
  - Mayor (2025–2026): Didier Padey
- Area^{1}: 6.43 km^{2} (2.48 sq mi)
- Highest elevation: 1,128 m (3,701 ft)
- Lowest elevation: 226 m (741 ft)
- Population (2023): 289
  - Density: 44.9/km^{2} (116/sq mi)
- Time zone: UTC+01:00 (CET)
  - Summer (DST): UTC+02:00 (CEST)
- INSEE/Postal code: 73140 /73170
- ^{1} French Land Register data, which excludes lakes, ponds, glaciers > 1 km^{2} (0.386 sq mi or 247 acres) and river estuaries.

Jongieux (French pronunciation: [ʒɔ̃ʒjø]; Arpitan: Zhondzeu) is a commune in the Savoie department in the Auvergne-Rhône-Alpes region in south-eastern France.

== Toponymy ==
As with many polysyllabic Arpitan toponyms or anthroponyms, the final -x marks oxytonic stress (on the last syllable), whereas the final -z indicates paroxytonic stress (on the penultimate syllable) and should not be pronounced, although in French it is often mispronounced due to hypercorrection.

== See also ==
- Communes of the Savoie department
