= Loisieux =

Loisieux Lajeu (Savoyard)
- Commune
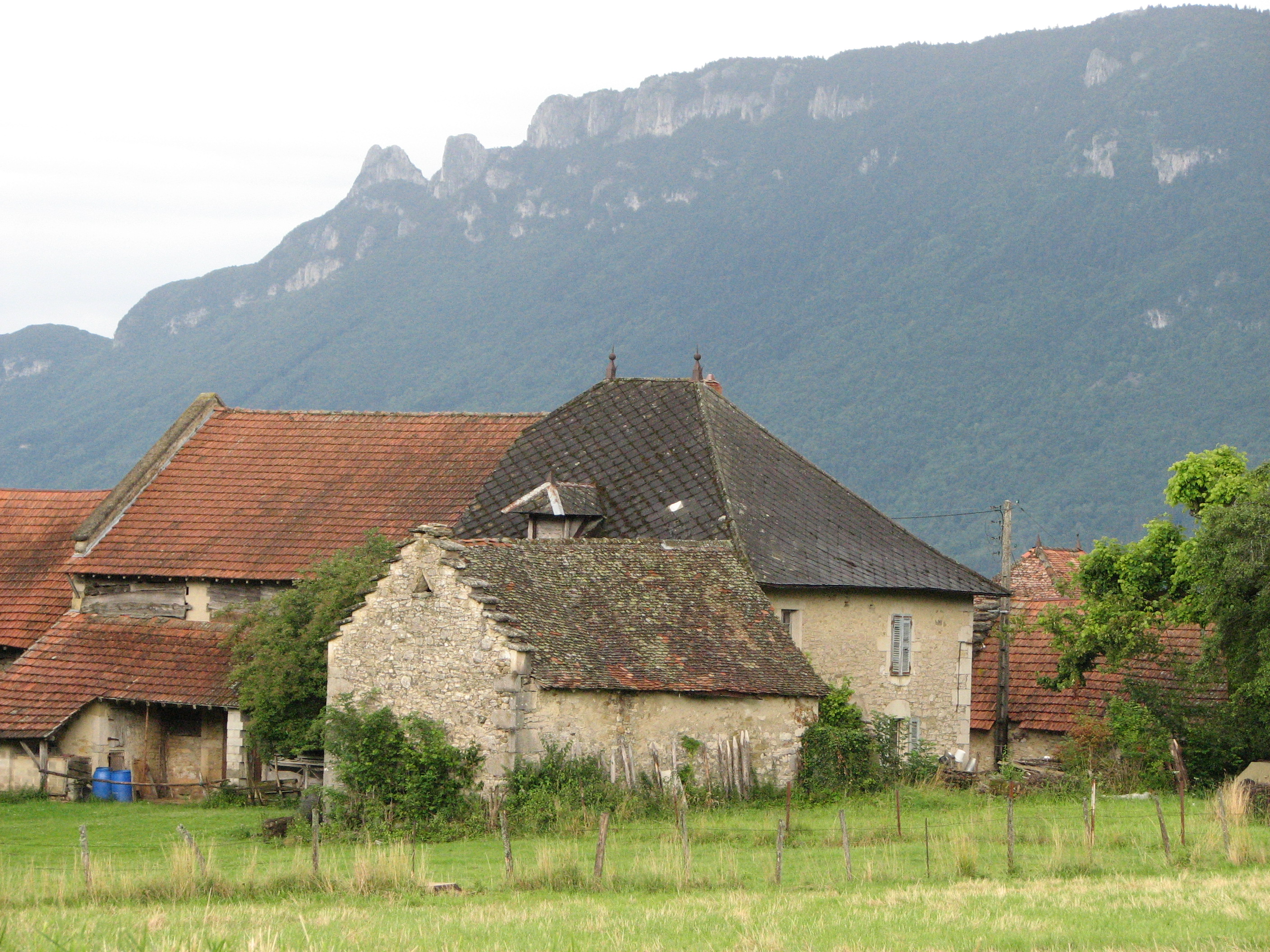
- A hamlet in the commune of Loisieux
- Location of Loisieux
- Location within France Location within Auvergne-Rhône-Alpes
- Coordinates: 45°39′08″N 5°44′09″E
- Country: France
- Region: Auvergne-Rhône-Alpes
- Department: Savoie
- Arrondissement: Chambéry
- Canton: Bugey savoyard
- Intercommunality: Yenne

Government
  - Mayor (2020–2026): Christian Garioud
- Area^{1}: 9.33 km^{2} (3.60 sq mi)
- Highest elevation: 860 m (2,820 ft)
- Lowest elevation: 360 m (1,180 ft)
- Population (2023): 236
  - Density: 25.3/km^{2} (65.5/sq mi)
- Time zone: UTC+01:00 (CET)
  - Summer (DST): UTC+02:00 (CEST)
- INSEE/Postal code: 73147 /73170
- ^{1} French Land Register data, which excludes lakes, ponds, glaciers > 1 km^{2} (0.386 sq mi or 247 acres) and river estuaries.

Loisieux (French pronunciation: [lwazjø]; Savoyard: Lajeu) is a commune in the Savoie department in the Auvergne-Rhône-Alpes region in south-eastern France.

== See also ==
- Communes of the Savoie department
