= Gerbaix =

- Commune
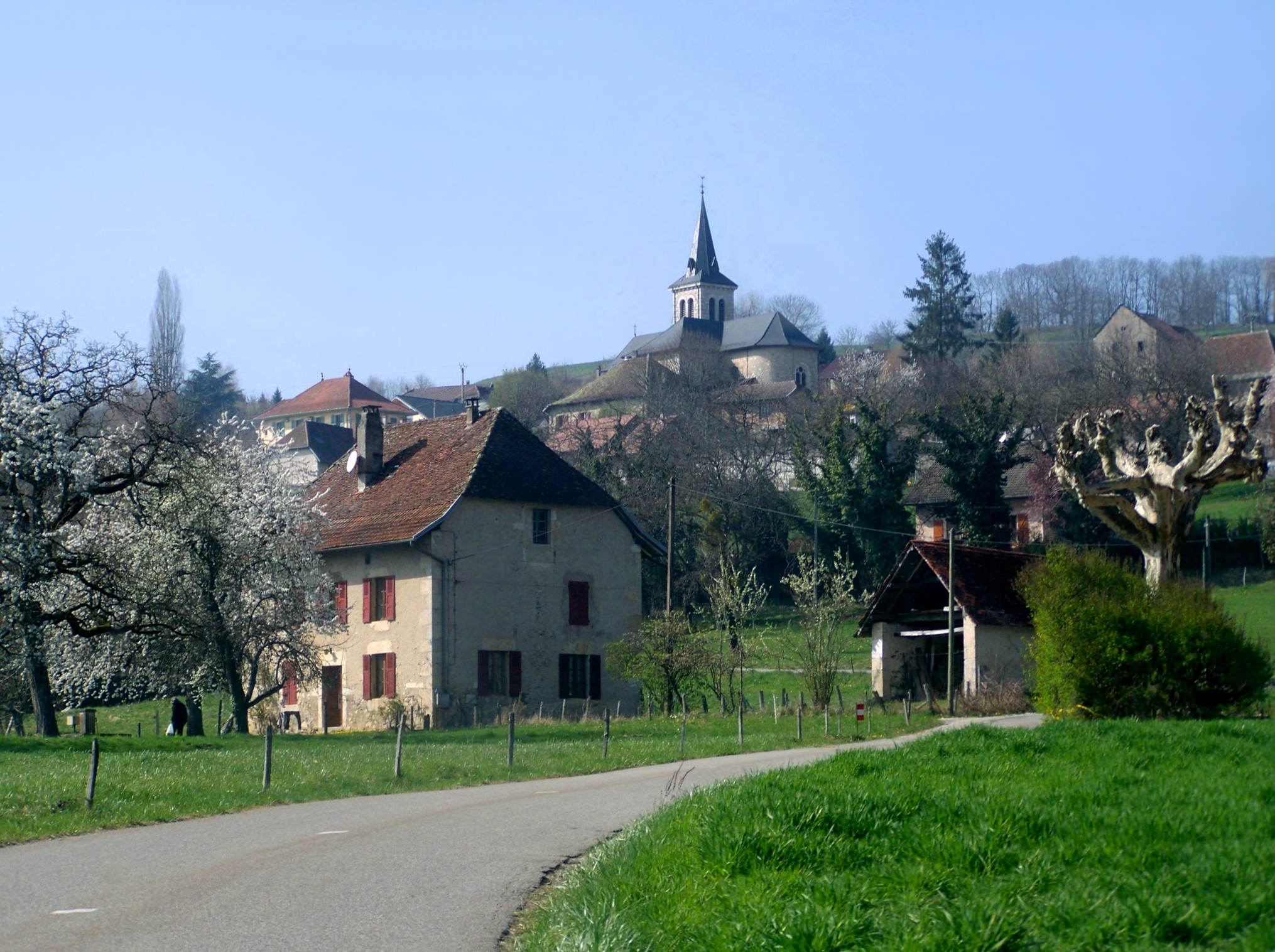
- Location of Gerbaix
- Location within France Location within Auvergne-Rhône-Alpes
- Coordinates: 45°36′38″N 5°44′52″E
- Country: France
- Region: Auvergne-Rhône-Alpes
- Department: Savoie
- Arrondissement: Chambéry
- Canton: Bugey savoyard
- Intercommunality: Lac d'Aiguebelette

Government
  - Mayor (2020–2026): Christophe Veuillet
- Area^{1}: 6.91 km^{2} (2.67 sq mi)
- Highest elevation: 858 m (2,815 ft)
- Lowest elevation: 440 m (1,440 ft)
- Population (2023): 461
  - Density: 66.7/km^{2} (173/sq mi)
- Time zone: UTC+01:00 (CET)
  - Summer (DST): UTC+02:00 (CEST)
- INSEE/Postal code: 73122 /73470
- ^{1} French Land Register data, which excludes lakes, ponds, glaciers > 1 km^{2} (0.386 sq mi or 247 acres) and river estuaries.

Gerbaix is a commune in the Savoie department in the Auvergne-Rhône-Alpes region in south-eastern France.

== See also ==
- Communes of the Savoie department
