= Canton of Bugey savoyard =

Coordinates: 45.70°N 5.76°E

Bugey savoyard
- Canton
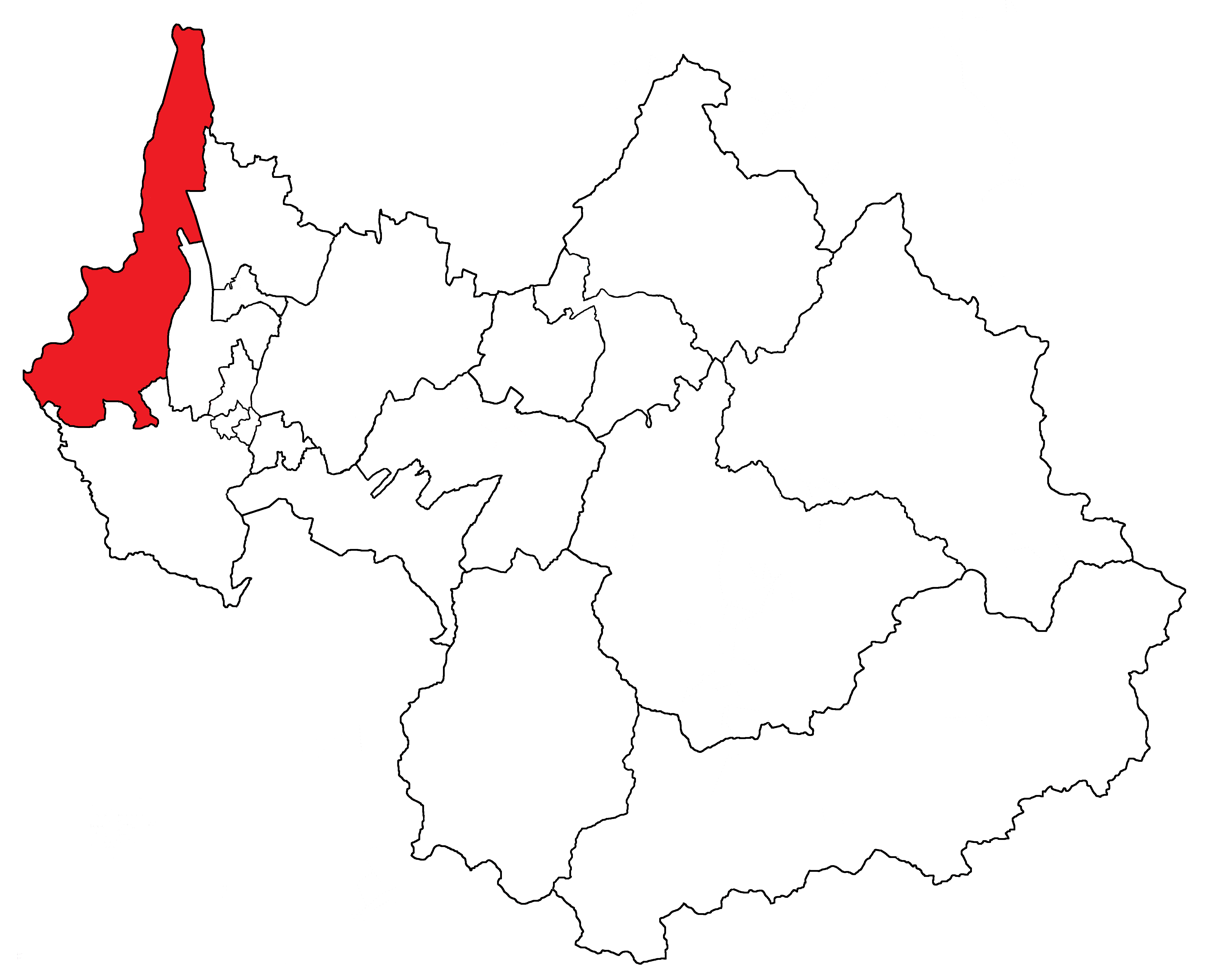
- Interactive map of Bugey savoyard
- Country: France
- Region: Auvergne-Rhône-Alpes
- Department: Savoie
- No. of communes: {{{nbcomm}}}

Government
  - Representatives (2021–2028): François Moiroud; Marie-Claire Barbier
- Area: 289.90 km^{2} (111.93 sq mi)
- Population (2023): 20,839
  - Density: 71.883/km^{2} (186.18/sq mi)
- INSEE code: 73 06

The canton of Bugey savoyard is an administrative division of the Savoie department, southeastern France. It was created at the French canton reorganisation which came into effect in March 2015. Its seat is in Yenne.

== Composition ==
It consists of the following communes:

1. Avressieux
2. La Balme
3. Billième
4. Champagneux
5. Chanaz
6. La Chapelle-Saint-Martin
7. Chindrieux
8. Conjux
9. Gerbaix
10. Jongieux
11. Loisieux
12. Lucey
13. Marcieux
14. Meyrieux-Trouet
15. Motz
16. Novalaise
17. Ontex
18. Rochefort
19. Ruffieux
20. Sainte-Marie-d'Alvey
21. Saint-Genix-les-Villages
22. Saint-Jean-de-Chevelu
23. Saint-Paul
24. Saint-Pierre-d'Alvey
25. Saint-Pierre-de-Curtille
26. Serrières-en-Chautagne
27. Traize
28. Verthemex
29. Vions
30. Yenne

== Councillors ==
Election	Councillors	Party	Occupation
2015	Gaston Arthaud-Berthet	LR	Mayor of Sainte-Marie-d'Alvey
2015	Marie-Claire Barbier	DVD	Mayor of Chindrieux

== Pictures of the canton ==
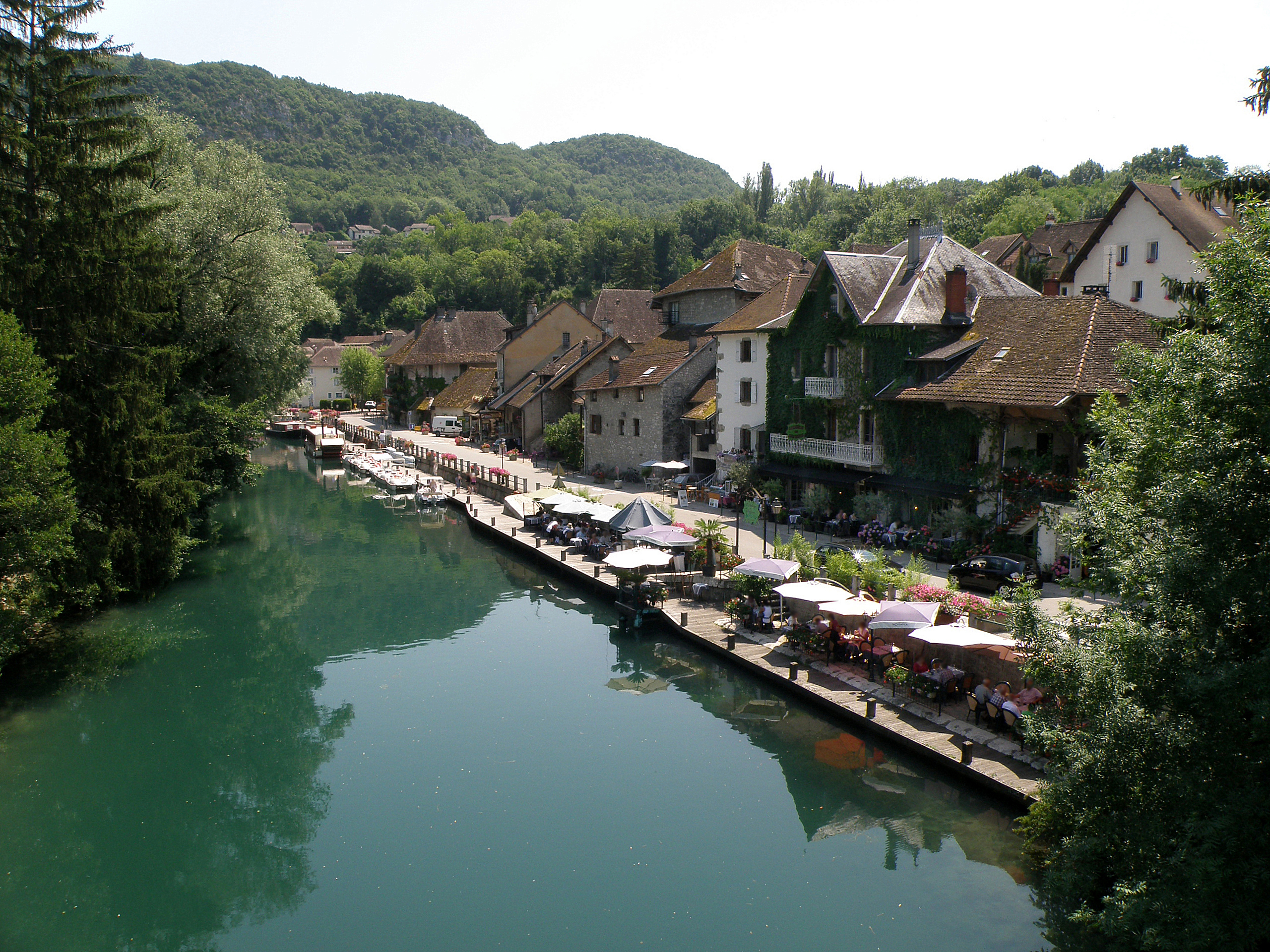
View of Chanaz

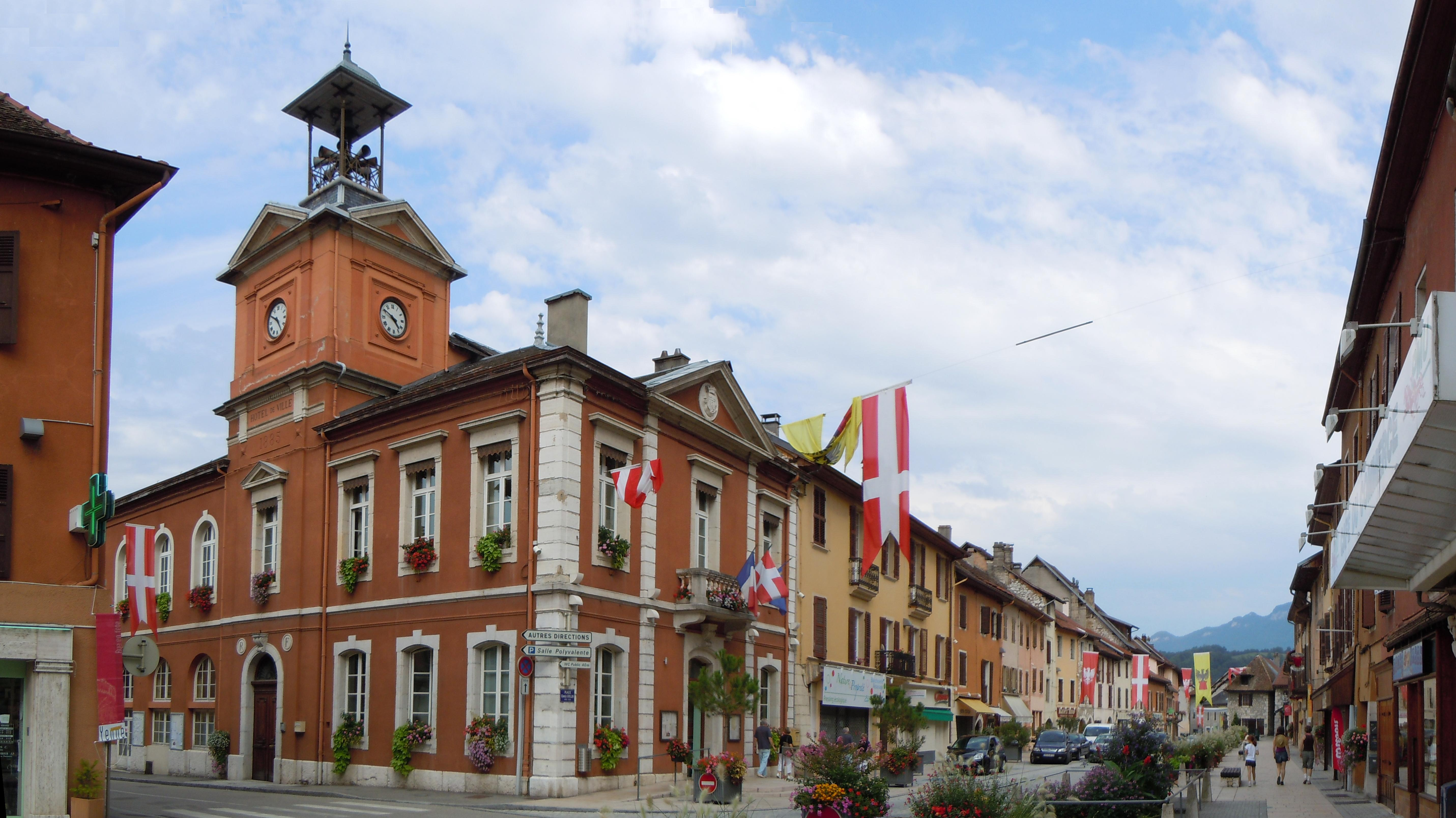
Charles Dullin Square in Yenne

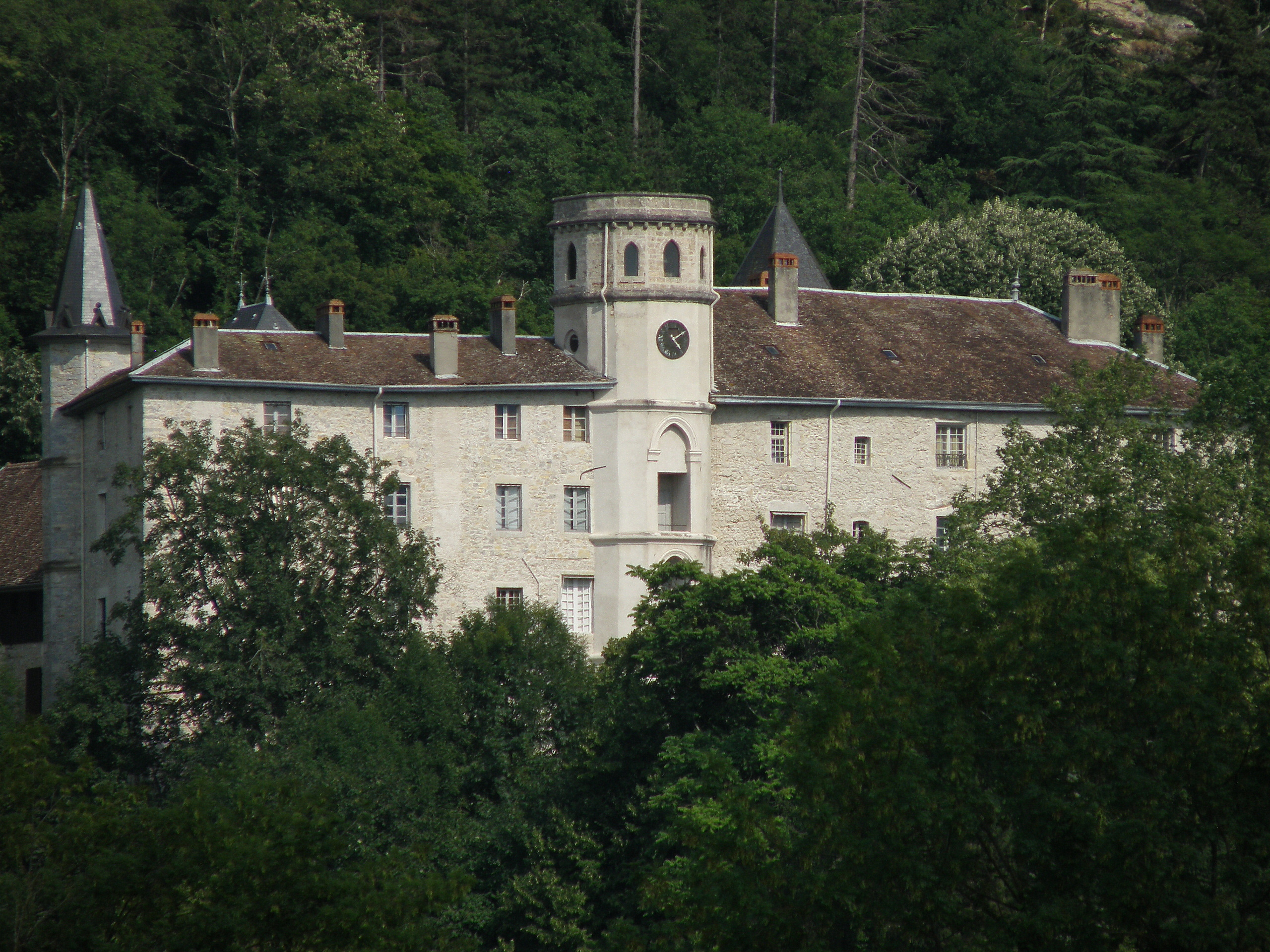
The "Lucey Castle"
