= Marquis of Vaulserre =

Coat of arms of the Corbel Corbeau de Vaulserre family

Marquis of Vaulserre (French: Marquis des Vaulserre) was a title in the Peerage of France.

== History ==
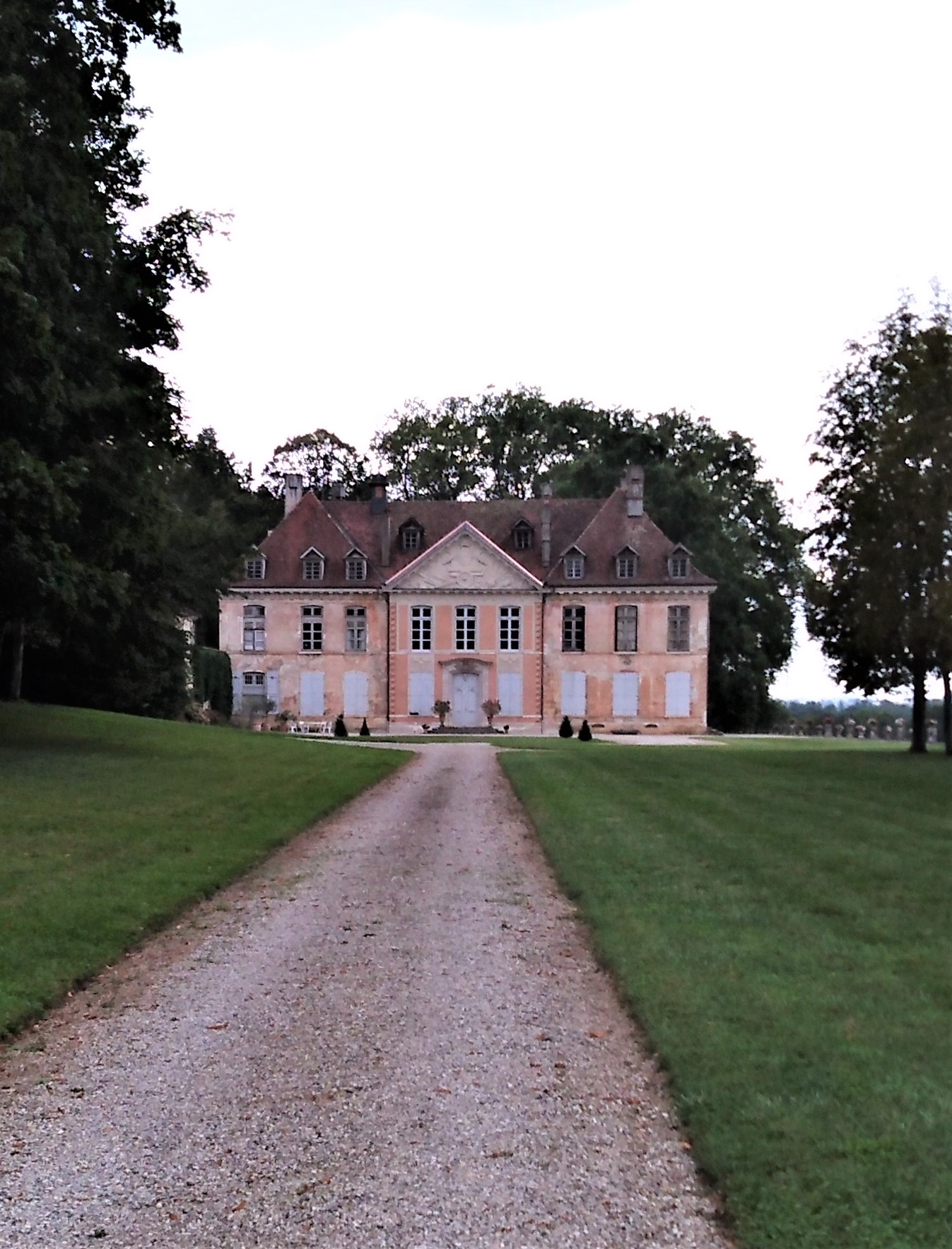
The Château de Vaulserre in Saint-Albin-de-Vaulserre

The title was created for Antoine Corbel-Corbeau de Vaulserre, Lord of Saint-Albin-de-Vaulserre (in the Isère department), of Puy-Saint-Martin (in the Drôme department), and of Saint-Franc (in the Savoie department), all in the Auvergne-Rhône-Alpes region in southeastern France, in August 1751 by King Louis XV "in consideration of the services rendered by his family".

The 5th Marquis of Vaulserre, was born at the Château de Vaulserre in Saint-Albin-de-Vaulserre in 1850. After his death without male issue in 1909, the Château was inherited by his youngest daughter, Yolande, who married Jean-Félix d'Aubigny. (Note: Yolande de Corbel-Corbeau de Vaulserre (1887–1945), transferred the Vaulserre estate including, Château de Vaulserre, to the family of her husband, Jean-Félix d'Aubigny, who in turn bequeathed it to his niece, Andrée de Parscau du Plessix, Viscountess Louis Bernard de Courville, mother of the current owner.) The marquisate, however, passed to his brother, Bruno. Upon his death, it passed to his only son, François de Corbel-Corbeau de Vaulserre, who died without issue in 1976.

== List of titleholders (1751–1976) ==
Number	From	To	Name	Relationship to predecessor	Spouse
1	1751	1761	Antoine de Corbel Corbeau	1st Marquis of Vaulserre	Marie-Anne Alloïs
2	1761	1785	François de Corbel Corbeau	Son	Marie-Gabrielle-Françoise de Rachais
3	1785	1849	François-Marie de Corbel Corbeau	Son	Gabrielle de La Rochelambert
4	1849	1906	Charles-François de Corbel Corbeau de Vaulserre	Son	Hélène de Théllusson
5	1906	1909	Maurice de Corbel Corbeau de Vaulserre	Son	Élisabeth-Marie de Moracin de Ramouzen
6	1909	1941	Bruno de Corbel Corbeau de Vaulserre	Brother	Marie-Thérèse de Curel
7	1941	1976	François de Corbel-Corbeau de Vaulserre	Son	Emmanuelle d'Albert de Luynes; Jeanne de Sabran-Pontèves

== See also ==
- French nobility
