= François de Corbel-Corbeau de Vaulserre =

French aristocrat

François Michel Marie de Corbel-Corbeau de Vaulserre, 7th Marquis of Vaulserre (2 July 1892 – 5 February 1976) was a French aristocrat.

== Early life ==
Coat of arms of the Corbel Corbeau de Vaulserre family

Vaulserre was born on 2 July 1892 in Hagondange, Lorraine, France into a Savoy family of ancient nobility. He was the son of Bruno Charles Armand Marie de Corbel-Corbeau de Vaulserre, 6th Marquis of Vaulserre (1853–1941) and Marie-Thérèse de Curel (1865–1949). His sisters were Marie-Aimée-Hélène de Corbel-Corbeau de Vaulserre (wife of Louis-Hugues-Charles de Klopstein) and Marthe de Corbel-Corbeau de Vaulserre (wife of Count Roger de Lancrau de Bréon).

His paternal grandparents were Marie Charles François de Corbel-Corbeau de Vaulserre, 4th Marquis of Vaulserre, and Hélène Françoise Louise de Thélusson. Through his paternal aunt, Berthe de Corbel-Corbeau de Vaulserre (the wife of Henri de Wendel, himself a son of Charles de Wendel and brother to Robert de Wendel), he was a first cousin of French industrialist and politician François de Wendel. His maternal grandparents were Robert Ernest de Curel and Marie Anne Mélanie Arson.

== Career ==
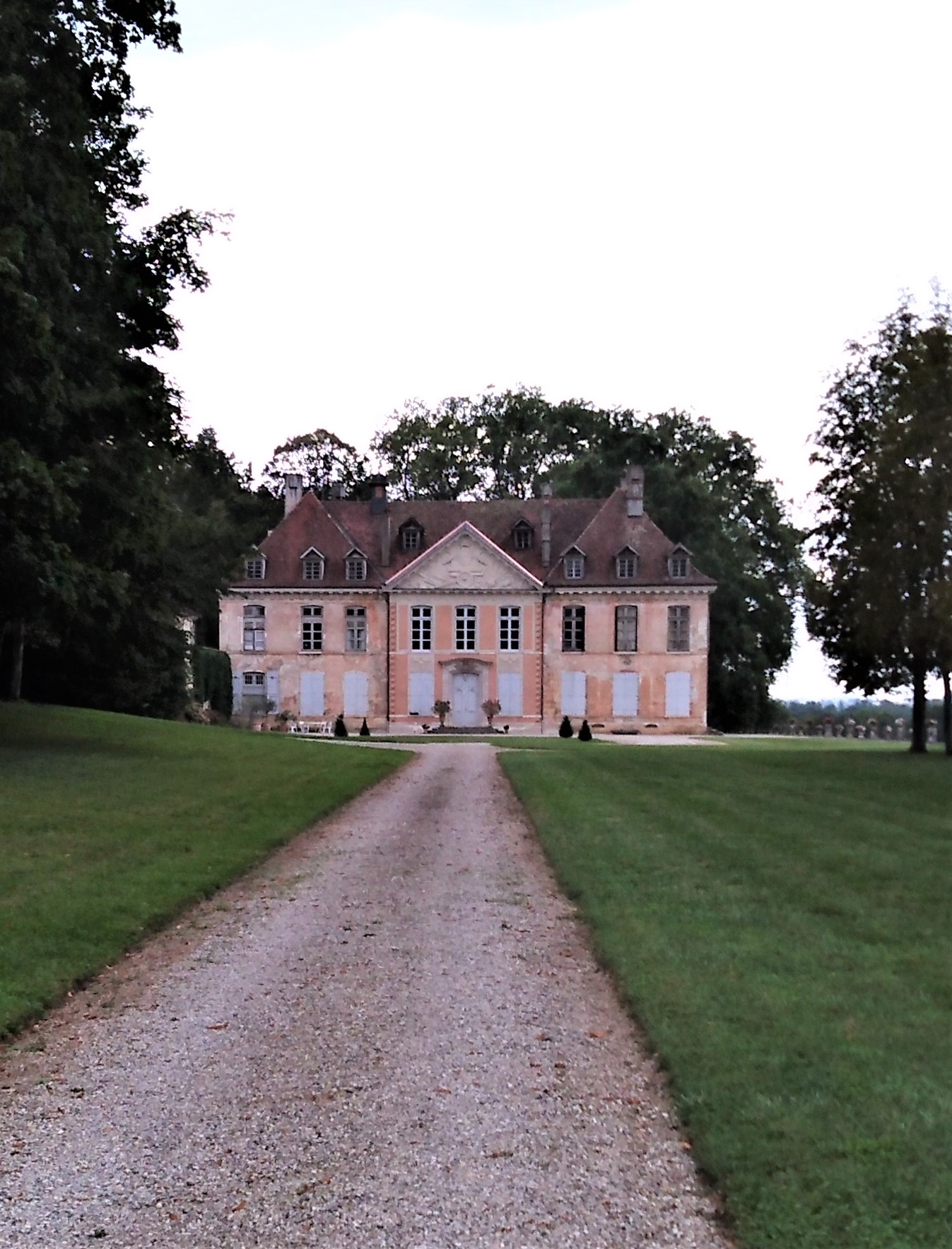
The Château de Vaulserre in Saint-Albin-de-Vaulserre

In August 1751, his ancestor, Antoine Corbel-Corbeau de Vaulserre, Lord of Saint-Albin-de-Vaulserre (in the Isère department), of Puy-Saint-Martin (in the Drôme department), and of Saint-Franc (in the Savoie department), all in the Auvergne-Rhône-Alpes region in southeastern France, was created a Marquis by King Louis XV "in consideration of the services rendered by his family". His uncle, Maurice de Corbel Corbeau de Vaulserre, 5th Marquis of Vaulserre, was born at the Château de Vaulserre in Saint-Albin-de-Vaulserre in 1850. After his death without male issue in 1909, the Château was inherited by his youngest daughter, Yolande, who married Jean-Félix d'Aubigny. (Note: His cousin Yolande (née Corbel-Corbeau de Vaulserre) (1887–1945), transferred the Vaulserre estate including, Château de Vaulserre, to the family of her husband, Jean-Félix d'Aubigny, who in turn bequeathed it to his niece, Andrée de Parscau du Plessix, Viscountess Louis Bernard de Courville, mother of the current owner.) The marquisate, however, passed to his father, Bruno, before passing to François in 1941. Before he became Marquis, he was known as Count.

== Personal life ==
On 11 August 1926, Count de Vaulserre married Emmanuelle Anne Yolande Charlotte Simone Valentine Marie Gabrielle d'Albert de Luynes (1891–1947) in Paris. She was the eldest daughter of Honoré d'Albert de Luynes, 10th Duke of Luynes, and Simone Louise Laure de Crussol d'Uzes (a daughter of Emmanuel de Crussol, 12th Duke of Uzès and Anne de Rochechouart de Mortemart, who inherited a large fortune from her great-grandmother, Madame Clicquot Ponsardin, founder of Veuve Clicquot). In Paris they lived at 32 rue de la Bienfaisance. The divorced on 31 January 1940.

They divorced and on 25 May 1943, he married Jeanne Marguerite Marie Josèphe Delphine Théodule de Sabran-Pontèves (1909–1979) in Paris. She was a daughter of Count Elzéar de Saban-Pontevès and Constance de Croÿ.

The Marquis died on 5 February 1976 in Nice, France. Upon his death, the marquisate became extinct.
