= Guiers (disambiguation) =

The Guiers is a river in the Isère and Savoie departments of eastern France.

Guiers may also refer to:

- Lac de Guiers, a lake in northern Senegal
- Entre-deux-Guiers, commune in the Isère department in south-eastern France
- Saint-Christophe-sur-Guiers, a commune in the Isère department in south-eastern France
- Saint-Genix-sur-Guiers, a commune in the Savoie department in the Rhône-Alpes, France
