= Verel =

Verel or Verèl is a surname.

- A. J. Verel, American kickboxer
- Engin Verel (born 1956), Turkish footballer
- Hans Verèl (1953–2019), Dutch footballer and manager

== See also ==
- Verel-Pragondran and Verel-de-Montbel, two communes in the Savoie department, Rhône-Alpes region, France
