= Domessin =

- Commune
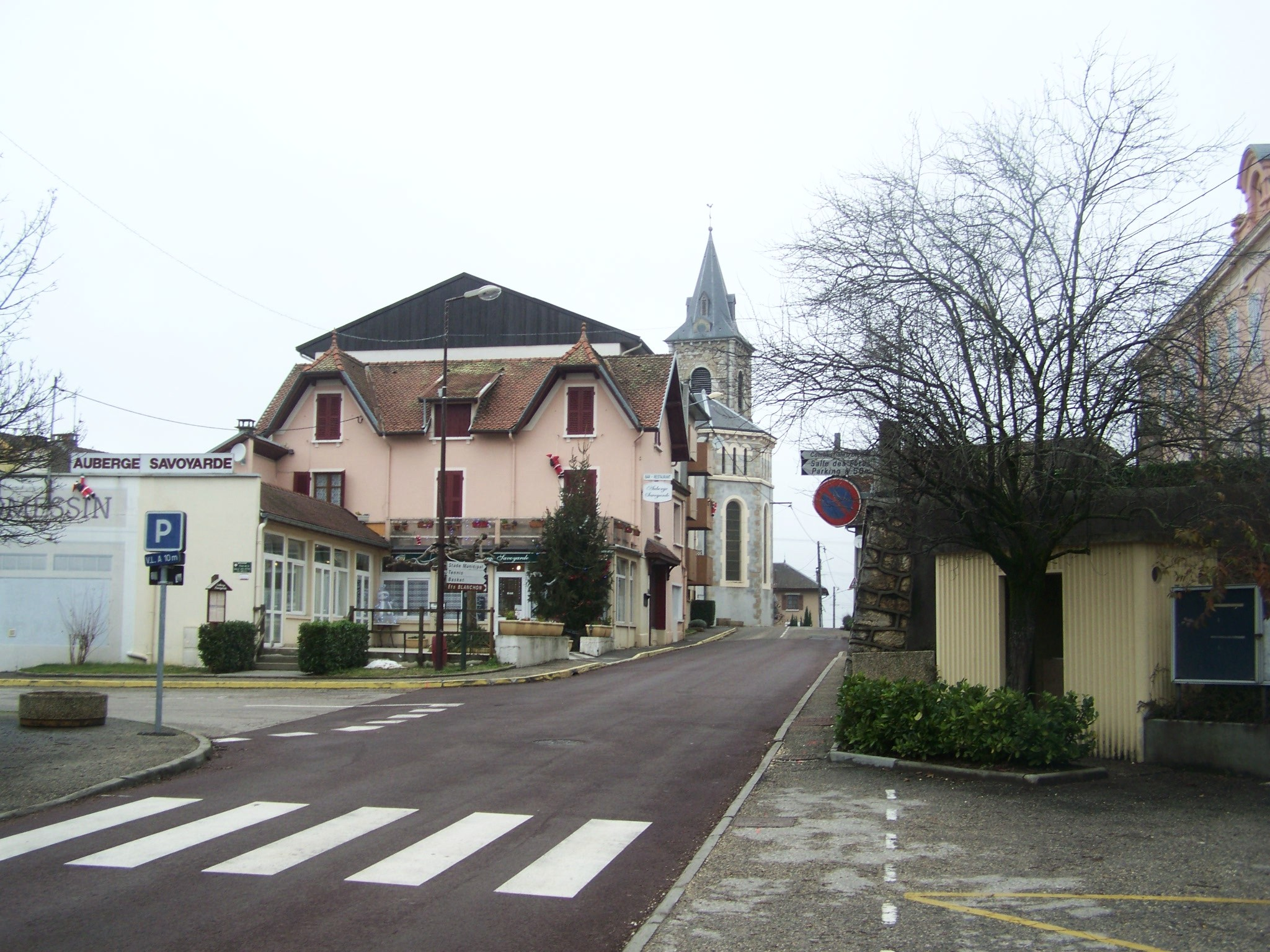
- The church and surrounding buildings in Domessin
- Location of Domessin
- Location within France Location within Auvergne-Rhône-Alpes
- Coordinates: 45°32′28″N 5°42′35″E
- Country: France
- Region: Auvergne-Rhône-Alpes
- Department: Savoie
- Arrondissement: Chambéry
- Canton: Le Pont-de-Beauvoisin
- Intercommunality: Val Guiers

Government
  - Mayor (2020–2026): Valérie André
- Area^{1}: 9.83 km^{2} (3.80 sq mi)
- Highest elevation: 364 m (1,194 ft)
- Lowest elevation: 235 m (771 ft)
- Population (2023): 2,005
  - Density: 204/km^{2} (528/sq mi)
- Time zone: UTC+01:00 (CET)
  - Summer (DST): UTC+02:00 (CEST)
- INSEE/Postal code: 73100 /73330
- Website: www.domessin.fr
- ^{1} French Land Register data, which excludes lakes, ponds, glaciers > 1 km^{2} (0.386 sq mi or 247 acres) and river estuaries.

Domessin (French pronunciation: [dɔmesɛ̃]; Arpitan: Domshin) is a commune in the Savoie department in the Auvergne-Rhône-Alpes region in south-eastern France.

== Population ==
Historical population
Year	Pop.	±% p.a.
1968	971	—
1975	995	+0.35%
1982	1,130	+1.83%
1990	1,271	+1.48%
1999	1,367	+0.81%
2007	1,496	+1.13%
2012	1,823	+4.03%
2017	1,855	+0.35%
2023	2,005	+1.30%
Source: INSEE

== See also ==
- Communes of the Savoie department
