= La Bauche =

- Commune
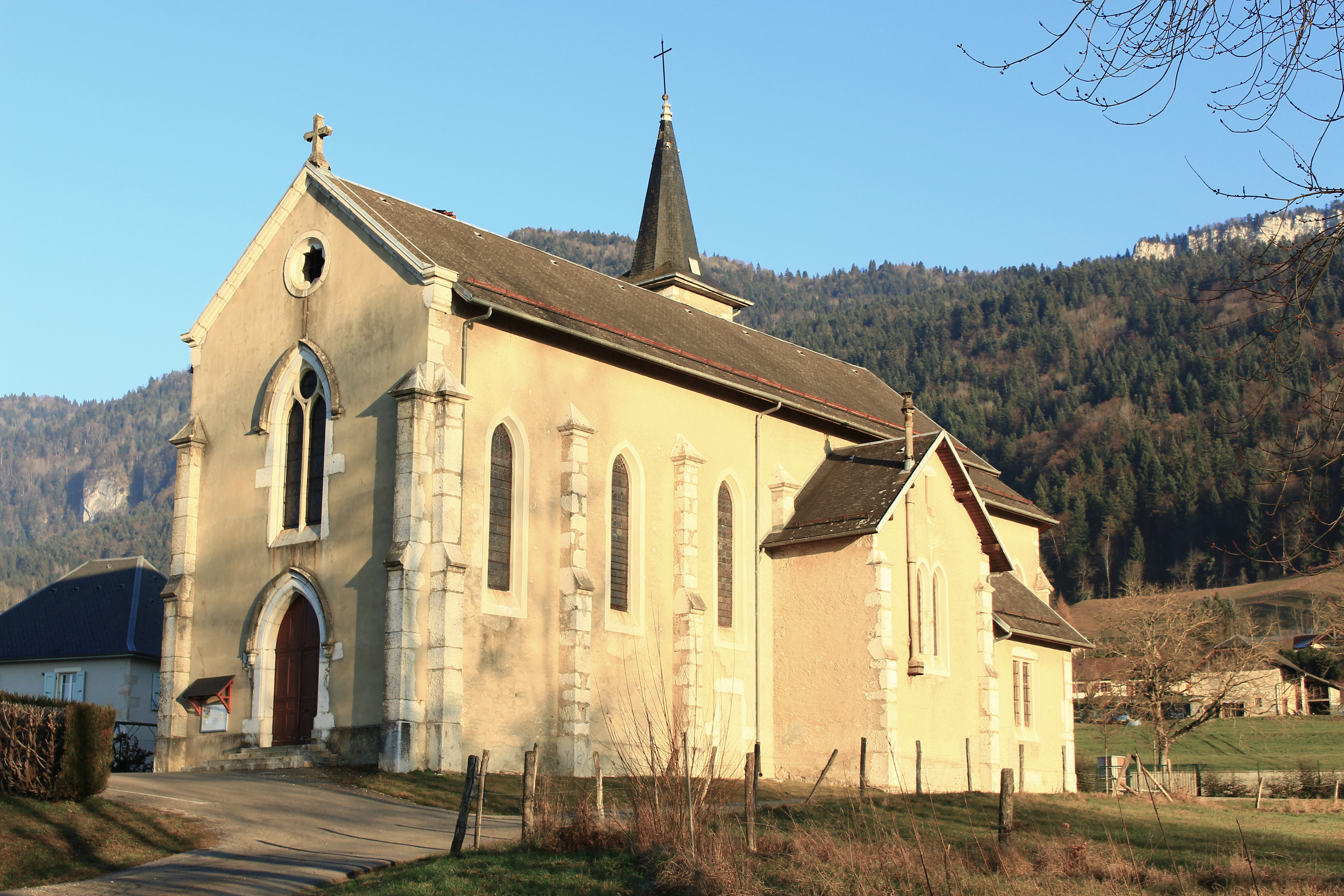
- Location of La Bauche
- Location within France Location within Auvergne-Rhône-Alpes
- Coordinates: 45°29′00″N 5°45′55″E
- Country: France
- Region: Auvergne-Rhône-Alpes
- Department: Savoie
- Arrondissement: Chambéry
- Canton: Le Pont-de-Beauvoisin
- Intercommunality: CC Cœur de Chartreuse

Government
  - Mayor (2020–2026): Evelyne Labrude
- Area^{1}: 6.58 km^{2} (2.54 sq mi)
- Highest elevation: 1,311 m (4,301 ft)
- Lowest elevation: 408 m (1,339 ft)
- Population (2023): 542
  - Density: 82.4/km^{2} (213/sq mi)
- Time zone: UTC+01:00 (CET)
  - Summer (DST): UTC+02:00 (CEST)
- INSEE/Postal code: 73033 /73360
- ^{1} French Land Register data, which excludes lakes, ponds, glaciers > 1 km^{2} (0.386 sq mi or 247 acres) and river estuaries.

La Bauche (French pronunciation: [la boʃ]; Arpitan: La Boush) is a commune in the Savoie department in the Auvergne-Rhône-Alpes region in south-eastern France.

== See also ==
- Communes of the Savoie department
