= Miribel-les-Échelles =

- Commune
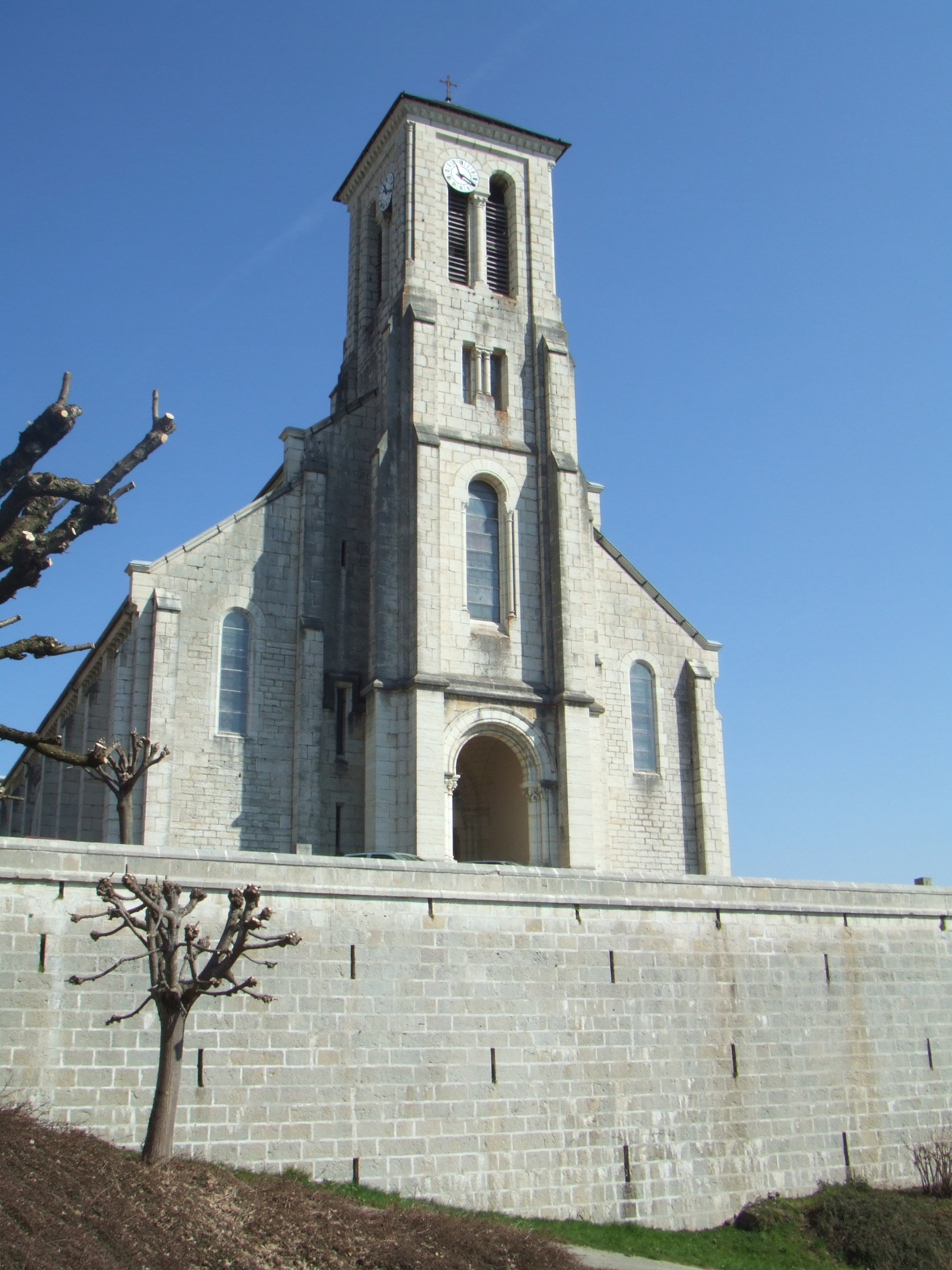
- The church of Miribel-les-Échelles

- Coat of arms
- Location of Miribel-les-Échelles
- Location within France Location within Auvergne-Rhône-Alpes
- Coordinates: 45°25′36″N 5°42′26″E
- Country: France
- Region: Auvergne-Rhône-Alpes
- Department: Isère
- Arrondissement: Grenoble
- Canton: Chartreuse-Guiers
- Intercommunality: CC Cœur de Chartreuse

Government
  - Mayor (2020–2026): Williams Dufour
- Area^{1}: 29.34 km^{2} (11.33 sq mi)
- Highest elevation: 1,509 m (4,951 ft)
- Lowest elevation: 423 m (1,388 ft)
- Population (2023): 1,713
  - Density: 58.38/km^{2} (151.2/sq mi)
- Time zone: UTC+01:00 (CET)
  - Summer (DST): UTC+02:00 (CEST)
- INSEE/Postal code: 38236 /38380
- ^{1} French Land Register data, which excludes lakes, ponds, glaciers > 1 km^{2} (0.386 sq mi or 247 acres) and river estuaries.

Miribel-les-Échelles (French pronunciation: [miʁibɛl le.z‿eʃɛl]) is a commune in the Isère department in southeastern France.

== Population ==
Historical population
Year	Pop.	±% p.a.
1968	1,209	—
1975	1,245	+0.42%
1982	1,442	+2.12%
1990	1,607	+1.36%
1999	1,708	+0.68%
2007	1,738	+0.22%
2012	1,740	+0.02%
2017	1,721	−0.22%
2023	1,713	−0.08%
Source: INSEE

== Notable person ==
- Henry Louis Le Chatelier (1850–1936) died in Miribel-les-Échelles

== See also ==
- Communes of the Isère department
