= Dullin =

- Commune
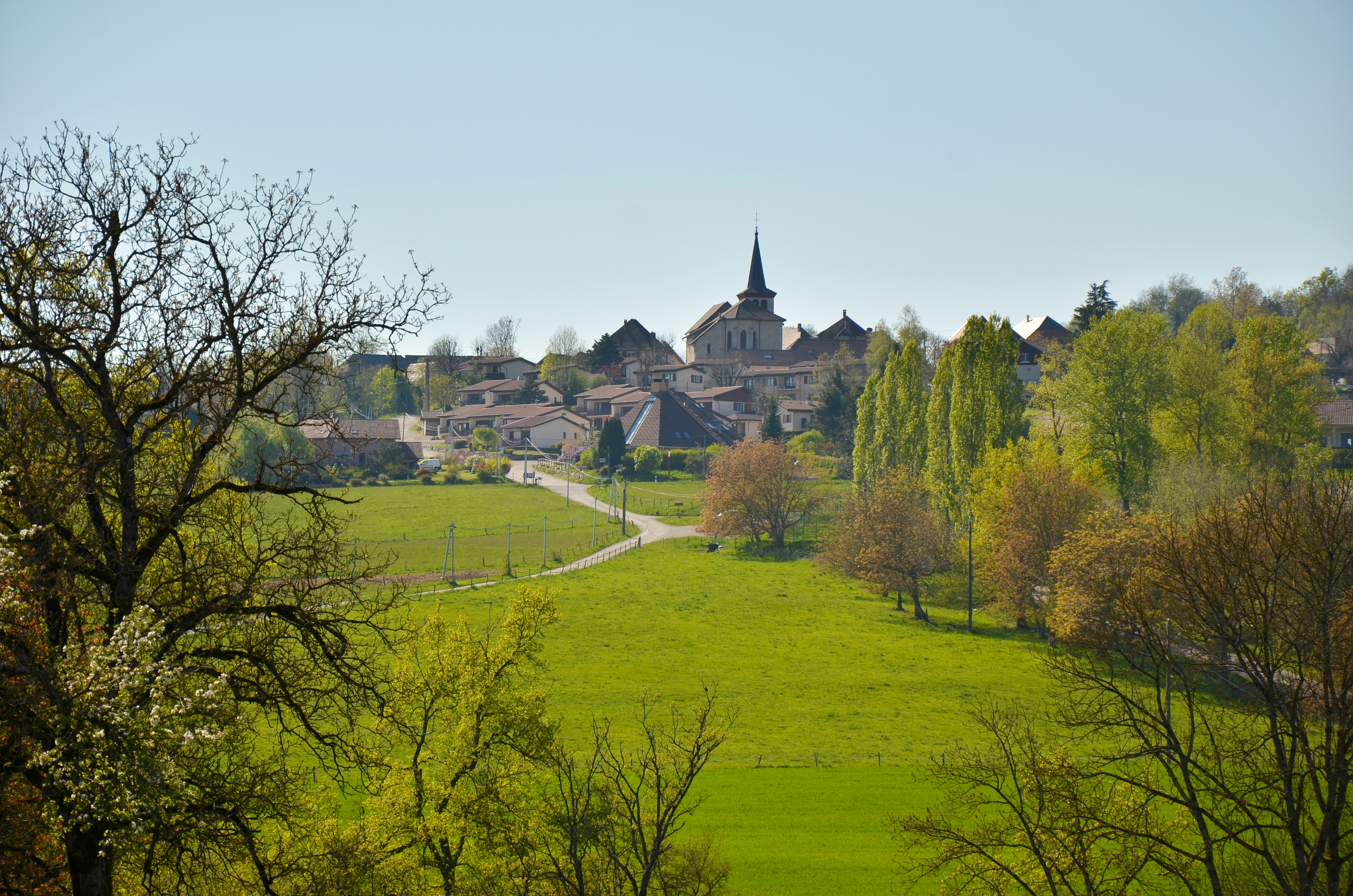
- Location of Dullin
- Location within France Location within Auvergne-Rhône-Alpes
- Coordinates: 45°33′17″N 5°44′43″E
- Country: France
- Region: Auvergne-Rhône-Alpes
- Department: Savoie
- Arrondissement: Chambéry
- Canton: Le Pont-de-Beauvoisin
- Intercommunality: Lac d'Aiguebelette

Government
  - Mayor (2020–2026): André Bois
- Area^{1}: 5.31 km^{2} (2.05 sq mi)
- Highest elevation: 669 m (2,195 ft)
- Lowest elevation: 280 m (920 ft)
- Population (2023): 497
  - Density: 93.6/km^{2} (242/sq mi)
- Time zone: UTC+01:00 (CET)
  - Summer (DST): UTC+02:00 (CEST)
- INSEE/Postal code: 73104 /73610
- ^{1} French Land Register data, which excludes lakes, ponds, glaciers > 1 km^{2} (0.386 sq mi or 247 acres) and river estuaries.

Dullin (French pronunciation: [dylɛ̃]; Arpitan: Dolin) is a commune in the Savoie department in the Auvergne-Rhône-Alpes region in south-eastern France.

== See also ==
- Communes of the Savoie department
