= Saint-Christophe, Savoie =

Saint-Christophe Sin Kristof (Savoyard)
- Commune
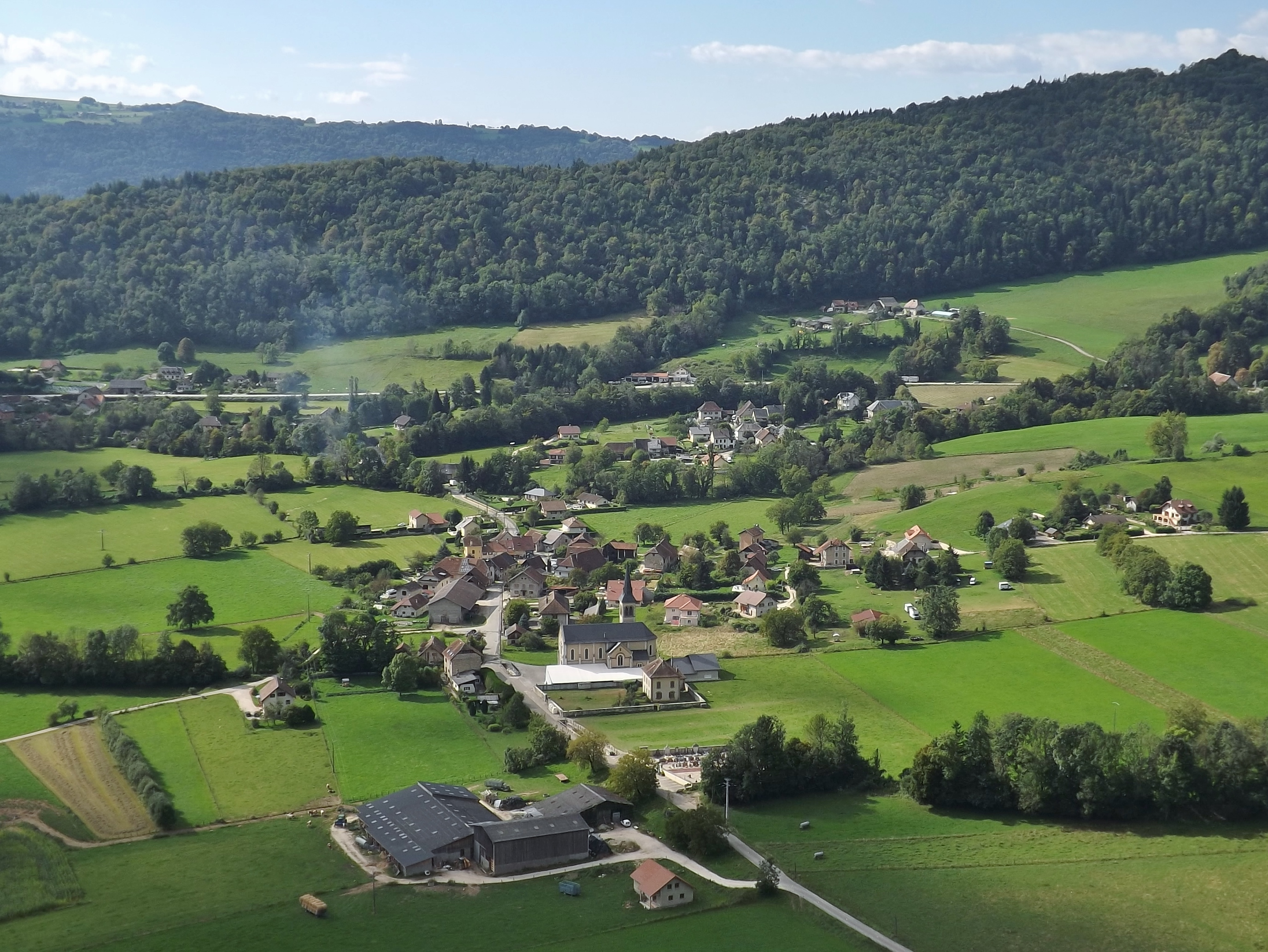
- A general view of Saint-Christophe
- Location of Saint-Christophe
- Location within France Location within Auvergne-Rhône-Alpes
- Coordinates: 45°27′05″N 5°46′35″E
- Country: France
- Region: Auvergne-Rhône-Alpes
- Department: Savoie
- Arrondissement: Chambéry
- Canton: Le Pont-de-Beauvoisin
- Intercommunality: CC Cœur de Chartreuse

Government
  - Mayor (2020–2026): Laurette Botta
- Area^{1}: 11.01 km^{2} (4.25 sq mi)
- Highest elevation: 1,253 m (4,111 ft)
- Lowest elevation: 385 m (1,263 ft)
- Population (2023): 545
  - Density: 49.5/km^{2} (128/sq mi)
- Time zone: UTC+01:00 (CET)
  - Summer (DST): UTC+02:00 (CEST)
- INSEE/Postal code: 73229 /73360
- ^{1} French Land Register data, which excludes lakes, ponds, glaciers > 1 km^{2} (0.386 sq mi or 247 acres) and river estuaries.

Saint-Christophe (French pronunciation: [sɛ̃ kʁistɔf]; Savoyard: Sin Kristof) is a commune in the Savoie department in the Auvergne-Rhône-Alpes region in south-eastern France.

== See also ==
- Communes of the Savoie department
