= Saint-Joseph-de-Rivière =

- Commune
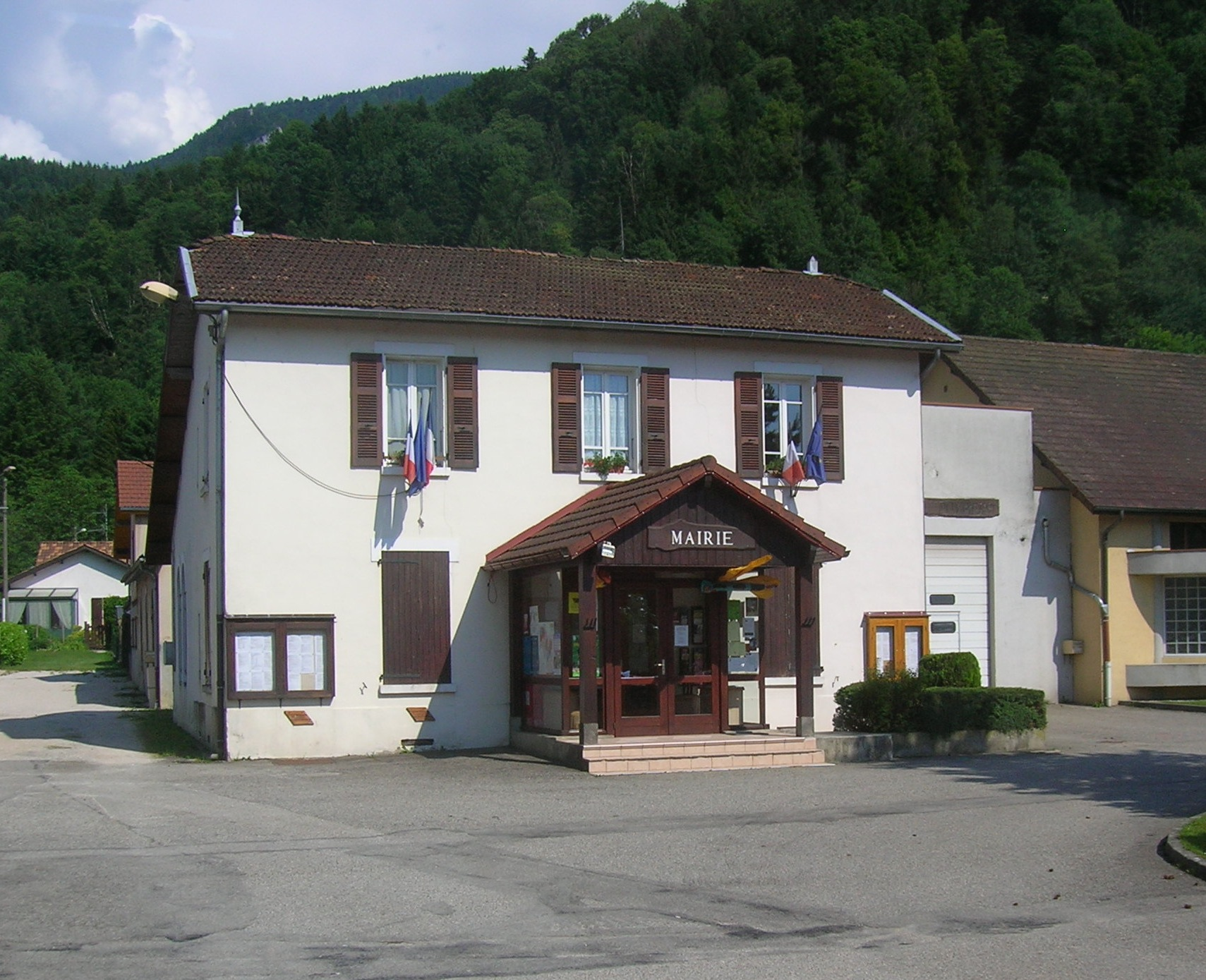
- The town hall of Saint-Joseph-de-Rivière
- Location of Saint-Joseph-de-Rivière
- Location within France Location within Auvergne-Rhône-Alpes
- Coordinates: 45°22′36″N 5°41′51″E
- Country: France
- Region: Auvergne-Rhône-Alpes
- Department: Isère
- Arrondissement: Grenoble
- Canton: Chartreuse-Guiers
- Intercommunality: CC Cœur de Chartreuse

Government
  - Mayor (2020–2026): Marylène Guijarro
- Area^{1}: 17.39 km^{2} (6.71 sq mi)
- Elevation: 418 m (1,371 ft)
- Highest elevation: 1,880 m (6,170 ft)
- Lowest elevation: 387 m (1,270 ft)
- Population (2023): 1,254
  - Density: 72.11/km^{2} (186.8/sq mi)
- Time zone: UTC+01:00 (CET)
  - Summer (DST): UTC+02:00 (CEST)
- INSEE/Postal code: 38405 /38134
- ^{1} French Land Register data, which excludes lakes, ponds, glaciers > 1 km^{2} (0.386 sq mi or 247 acres) and river estuaries.

Saint-Joseph-de-Rivière (French pronunciation: [sɛ̃ ʒozɛf də ʁivjɛʁ]) is a commune in the Isère department in southeastern France.

== Population ==
Historical population
Year	Pop.	±% p.a.
1968	533	—
1975	598	+1.66%
1982	723	+2.75%
1990	800	+1.27%
1999	961	+2.06%
2007	1,097	+1.67%
2012	1,174	+1.37%
2017	1,219	+0.76%
2023	1,254	+0.47%
Source: INSEE

== See also ==
- Communes of the Isère department
