= Saint-Pierre-de-Genebroz =

Saint-Pierre-de-Genebroz San Pyèrè (Savoyard)
- Commune
- Location of Saint-Pierre-de-Genebroz
- Location within France Location within Auvergne-Rhône-Alpes
- Coordinates: 45°27′12″N 5°45′17″E
- Country: France
- Region: Auvergne-Rhône-Alpes
- Department: Savoie
- Arrondissement: Chambéry
- Canton: Le Pont-de-Beauvoisin
- Intercommunality: CC Cœur de Chartreuse

Government
  - Mayor (2020–2026): Christine Wagon
- Area^{1}: 6.14 km^{2} (2.37 sq mi)
- Highest elevation: 1,313 m (4,308 ft)
- Lowest elevation: 380 m (1,250 ft)
- Population (2023): 334
  - Density: 54.4/km^{2} (141/sq mi)
- Time zone: UTC+01:00 (CET)
  - Summer (DST): UTC+02:00 (CEST)
- INSEE/Postal code: 73275 /73360
- ^{1} French Land Register data, which excludes lakes, ponds, glaciers > 1 km^{2} (0.386 sq mi or 247 acres) and river estuaries.

Saint-Pierre-de-Genebroz (Savoyard: San Pyèrè) is a commune in the Savoie department in the Auvergne-Rhône-Alpes region in south-eastern France.

== See also ==
- Communes of the Savoie department
