= Belmont-Tramonet =

Belmont-Tramonet Bèrmon (Savoyard)
- Commune
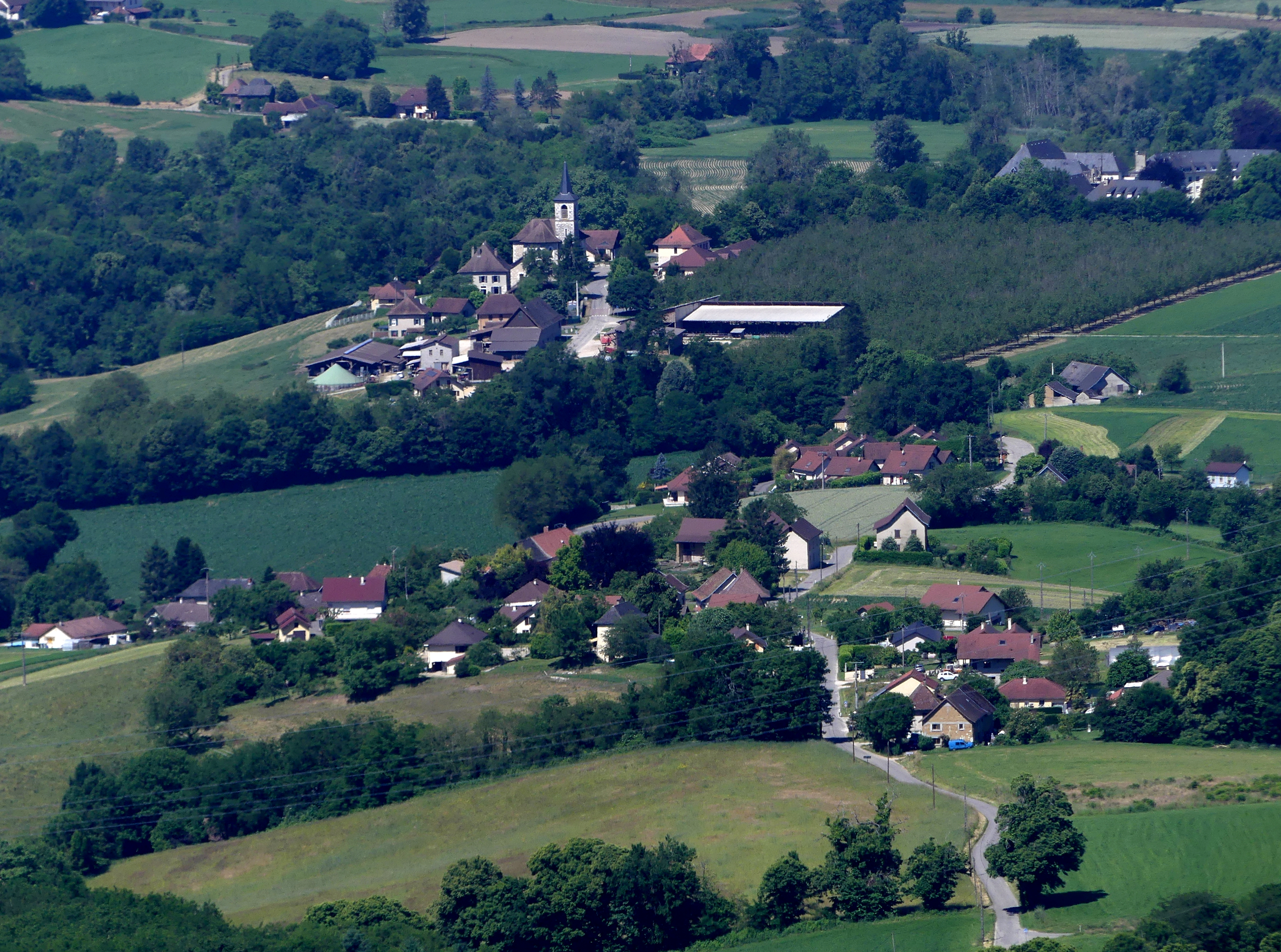
- Location of Belmont-Tramonet
- Location within France Location within Auvergne-Rhône-Alpes
- Coordinates: 45°33′37″N 5°40′48″E
- Country: France
- Region: Auvergne-Rhône-Alpes
- Department: Savoie
- Arrondissement: Chambéry
- Canton: Le Pont-de-Beauvoisin
- Intercommunality: Val Guiers

Government
  - Mayor (2020–2026): Nicolas Verguet
- Area^{1}: 5.46 km^{2} (2.11 sq mi)
- Highest elevation: 360 m (1,180 ft)
- Lowest elevation: 219 m (719 ft)
- Population (2023): 505
  - Density: 92.5/km^{2} (240/sq mi)
- Time zone: UTC+01:00 (CET)
  - Summer (DST): UTC+02:00 (CEST)
- INSEE/Postal code: 73039 /73330
- Website: www.belmont-tramonet.fr
- ^{1} French Land Register data, which excludes lakes, ponds, glaciers > 1 km^{2} (0.386 sq mi or 247 acres) and river estuaries.

Belmont-Tramonet (French pronunciation: [bɛlmɔ̃ tʁamɔnɛ]; Arpitan: Bèrmon) is a commune in the Savoie department in the Auvergne-Rhône-Alpes region in south-eastern France.

== See also ==
- Communes of the Savoie department
