= Communauté de communes Cœur de Chartreuse =

Federation of municipalities in France

Cœur de Chartreuse
- Communauté de communes
- Interactive map of Cœur de Chartreuse
- Coordinates: 45°25′N 05°48′E
- Country: France
- Region: Auvergne-Rhône-Alpes
- Department: Isère, Savoie
- No. of communes: {{{nbcomm}}}
- Established: 2014
- Area: 356.8 km^{2} (137.8 sq mi)
- Population (2019): 17,052
  - Density: 47.79/km^{2} (123.8/sq mi)

Communauté de communes Cœur de Chartreuse is a French intercommunality composed of 17 communes, situated in the departments of Isère and Savoie in the Auvergne-Rhône-Alpes region. It was founded on January 1, 2014. It seat is Entre-deux-Guiers. Its area is 356.8 km^{2}, and its population was 17,052 in 2019.

== Composition ==
The communauté de communes consists of the following 17 communes, of which 7 in Isère and 10 in Savoie:

1. Entre-deux-Guiers (seat)
2. La Bauche
3. Corbel
4. Entremont-le-Vieux
5. Les Échelles
6. Miribel-les-Échelles
7. Saint-Christophe
8. Saint-Christophe-sur-Guiers
9. Saint-Jean-de-Couz
10. Saint-Joseph-de-Rivière
11. Saint-Franc
12. Saint-Laurent-du-Pont
13. Saint-Pierre-de-Chartreuse
14. Saint-Pierre-d'Entremont, Savoie
15. Saint-Pierre-d'Entremont, Isère
16. Saint-Pierre-de-Genebroz
17. Saint-Thibaud-de-Couz
