= Ayn, Savoie =

Ayn Ayin (Savoyard)
- Commune
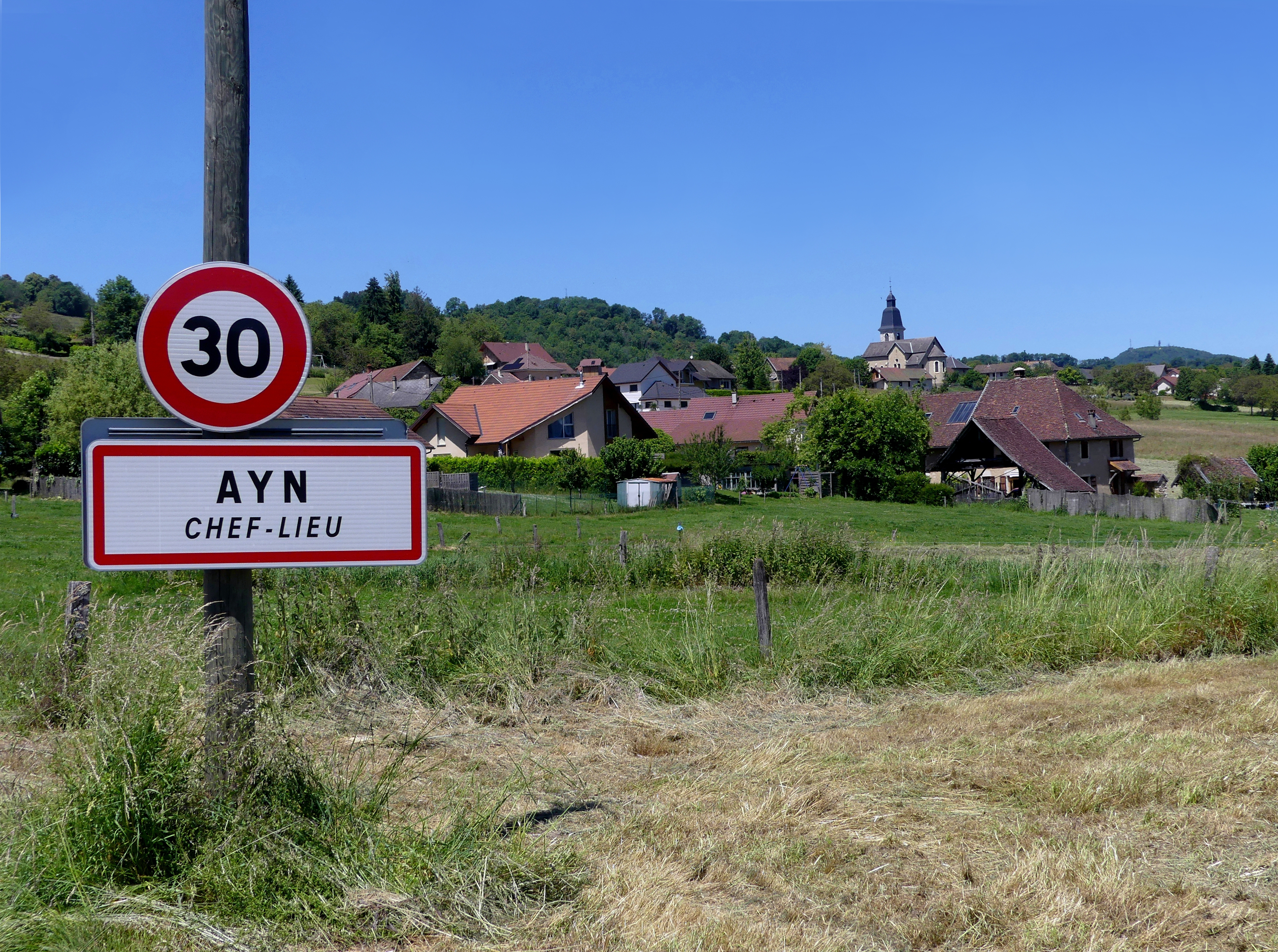
- Location of Ayn
- Location within France Location within Auvergne-Rhône-Alpes
- Coordinates: 45°34′24″N 5°45′05″E
- Country: France
- Region: Auvergne-Rhône-Alpes
- Department: Savoie
- Arrondissement: Chambéry
- Canton: Le Pont-de-Beauvoisin
- Intercommunality: CC Lac d'Aiguebelette

Government
  - Mayor (2020–2026): Frédéric Touihrat
- Area^{1}: 7.44 km^{2} (2.87 sq mi)
- Highest elevation: 720 m (2,360 ft)
- Lowest elevation: 440 m (1,440 ft)
- Population (2023): 392
  - Density: 52.7/km^{2} (136/sq mi)
- Demonym: Aynsards / Aynsardes
- Time zone: UTC+01:00 (CET)
  - Summer (DST): UTC+02:00 (CEST)
- INSEE/Postal code: 73027 /73470
- ^{1} French Land Register data, which excludes lakes, ponds, glaciers > 1 km^{2} (0.386 sq mi or 247 acres) and river estuaries.

Ayn (French pronunciation: [ajɛ̃]; Arpitan: Ayin) is a commune in the Savoie department in the Auvergne-Rhône-Alpes region in south-eastern France.

== See also ==
- Communes of the Savoie department
