= Saint-Béron =

- Commune
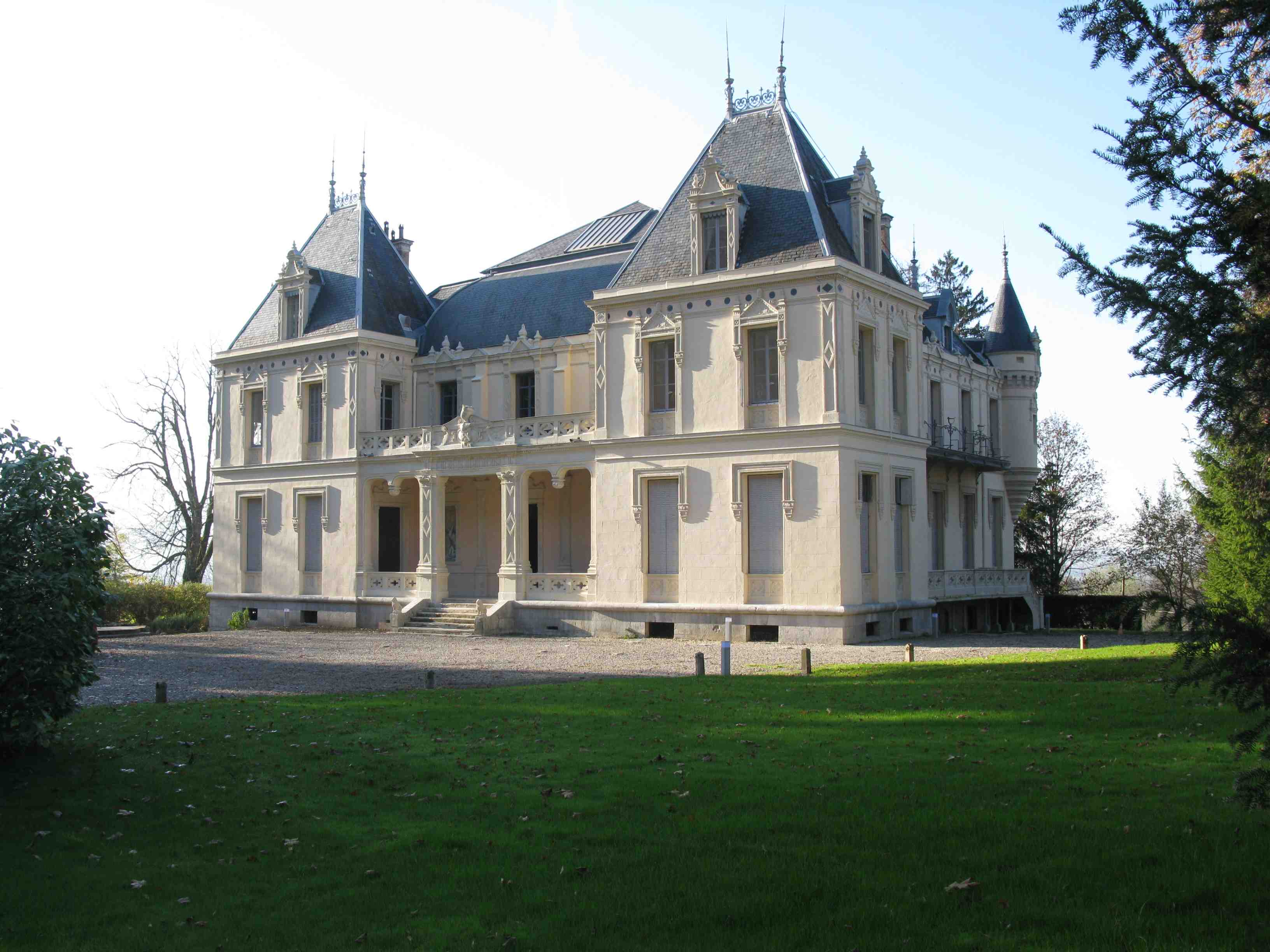
- The chateau in Saint-Béron
- Location of Saint-Béron
- Location within France Location within Auvergne-Rhône-Alpes
- Coordinates: 45°30′08″N 5°43′48″E
- Country: France
- Region: Auvergne-Rhône-Alpes
- Department: Savoie
- Arrondissement: Chambéry
- Canton: Le Pont-de-Beauvoisin
- Intercommunality: Val Guiers

Government
  - Mayor (2020–2026): Alain Perrot
- Area^{1}: 8.66 km^{2} (3.34 sq mi)
- Highest elevation: 573 m (1,880 ft)
- Lowest elevation: 254 m (833 ft)
- Population (2023): 1,713
  - Density: 198/km^{2} (512/sq mi)
- Time zone: UTC+01:00 (CET)
  - Summer (DST): UTC+02:00 (CEST)
- INSEE/Postal code: 73226 /73520
- ^{1} French Land Register data, which excludes lakes, ponds, glaciers > 1 km^{2} (0.386 sq mi or 247 acres) and river estuaries.

Saint-Béron (French pronunciation: [sɛ̃ beʁɔ̃]; Arpitan: San Beron) is a commune in the Savoie department in the Auvergne-Rhône-Alpes region in south-eastern France.

== See also ==
- Communes of the Savoie department
