= Entre-deux-Guiers =

- Commune
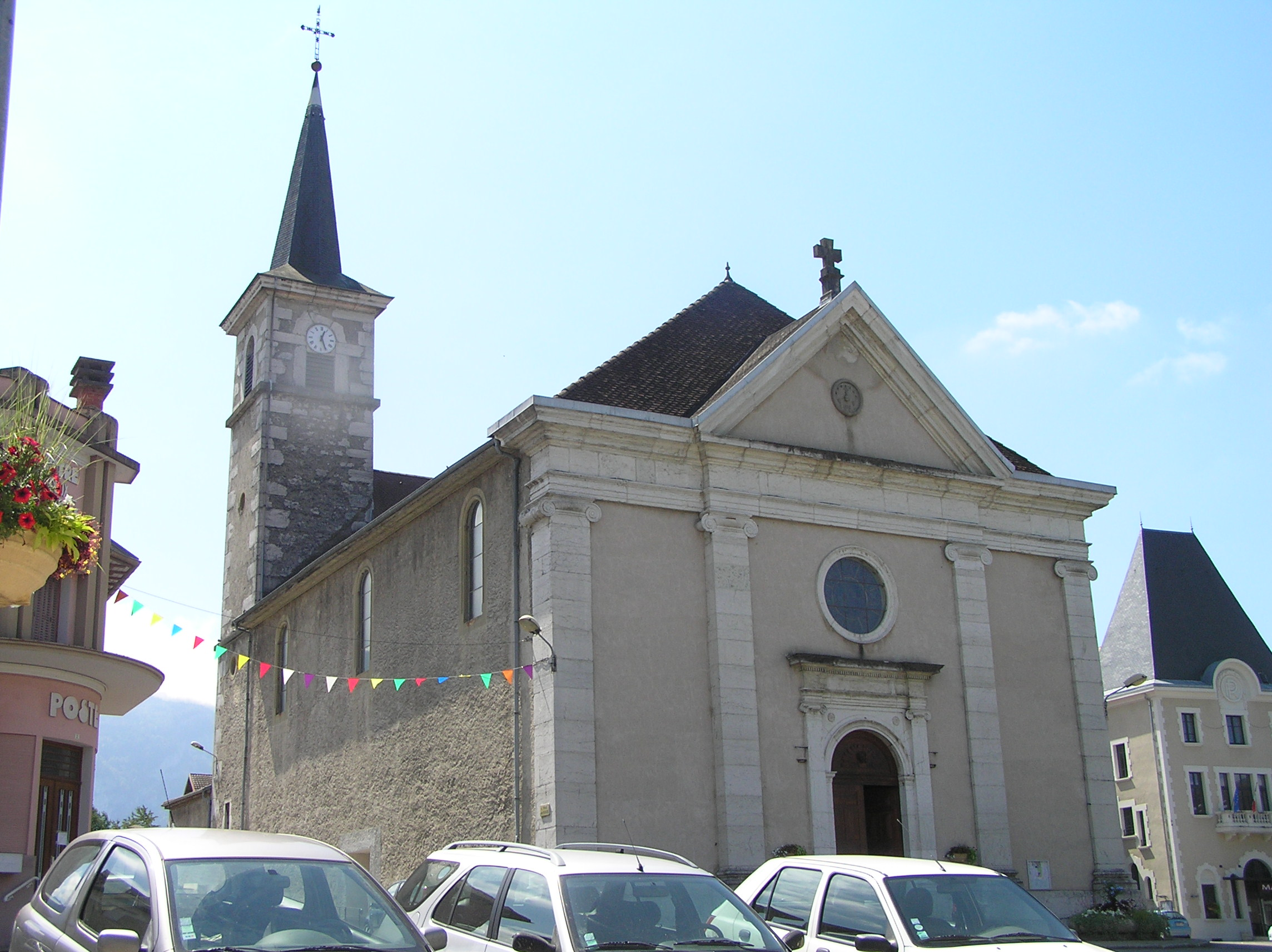
- The church of Entre-deux-Guiers

- Coat of arms
- Location of Entre-deux-Guiers
- Location within France Location within Auvergne-Rhône-Alpes
- Coordinates: 45°25′58″N 5°45′03″E
- Country: France
- Region: Auvergne-Rhône-Alpes
- Department: Isère
- Arrondissement: Grenoble
- Canton: Chartreuse-Guiers
- Intercommunality: CC Cœur de Chartreuse

Government
  - Mayor (2020–2026): Pierre Baffert
- Area^{1}: 10.55 km^{2} (4.07 sq mi)
- Highest elevation: 1,420 m (4,660 ft)
- Lowest elevation: 373 m (1,224 ft)
- Population (2023): 1,915
  - Density: 181.5/km^{2} (470.1/sq mi)
- Time zone: UTC+01:00 (CET)
  - Summer (DST): UTC+02:00 (CEST)
- INSEE/Postal code: 38155 /38380
- ^{1} French Land Register data, which excludes lakes, ponds, glaciers > 1 km^{2} (0.386 sq mi or 247 acres) and river estuaries.

Entre-deux-Guiers (French pronunciation: [ɑ̃tʁ dø ɡje], literally Between Two Guiers) is a commune in the Isère department in southeastern France.

== Population ==
Historical population
Year	Pop.	±% p.a.
1968	1,529	—
1975	1,501	−0.26%
1982	1,459	−0.40%
1990	1,544	+0.71%
1999	1,477	−0.49%
2007	1,668	+1.53%
2012	1,755	+1.02%
2017	1,763	+0.09%
2023	1,915	+1.39%
Source: INSEE

== See also ==
- Communes of the Isère department
