= Canton of Le Pont-de-Beauvoisin =

Coordinates: 45.54°N 5.68°E

The canton of Le Pont-de-Beauvoisin is an administrative division of the Savoie department, southeastern France. Its borders were modified at the French canton reorganisation which came into effect in March 2015. Its seat is in Le Pont-de-Beauvoisin.

It consists of the following communes:

1. Aiguebelette-le-Lac
2. Attignat-Oncin
3. Ayn
4. La Bauche
5. Belmont-Tramonet
6. La Bridoire
7. Corbel
8. Domessin
9. Dullin
10. Les Échelles
11. Entremont-le-Vieux
12. Lépin-le-Lac
13. Montagnole
14. Nances
15. Le Pont-de-Beauvoisin
16. Saint-Alban-de-Montbel
17. Saint-Béron
18. Saint-Cassin
19. Saint-Christophe
20. Saint-Franc
21. Saint-Jean-de-Couz
22. Saint-Pierre-d'Entremont
23. Saint-Pierre-de-Genebroz
24. Saint-Sulpice
25. Saint-Thibaud-de-Couz
26. Verel-de-Montbel
27. Vimines
