= Attignat-Oncin =

Attignat-Oncin Attigna Onshin (Savoyard)
- Commune
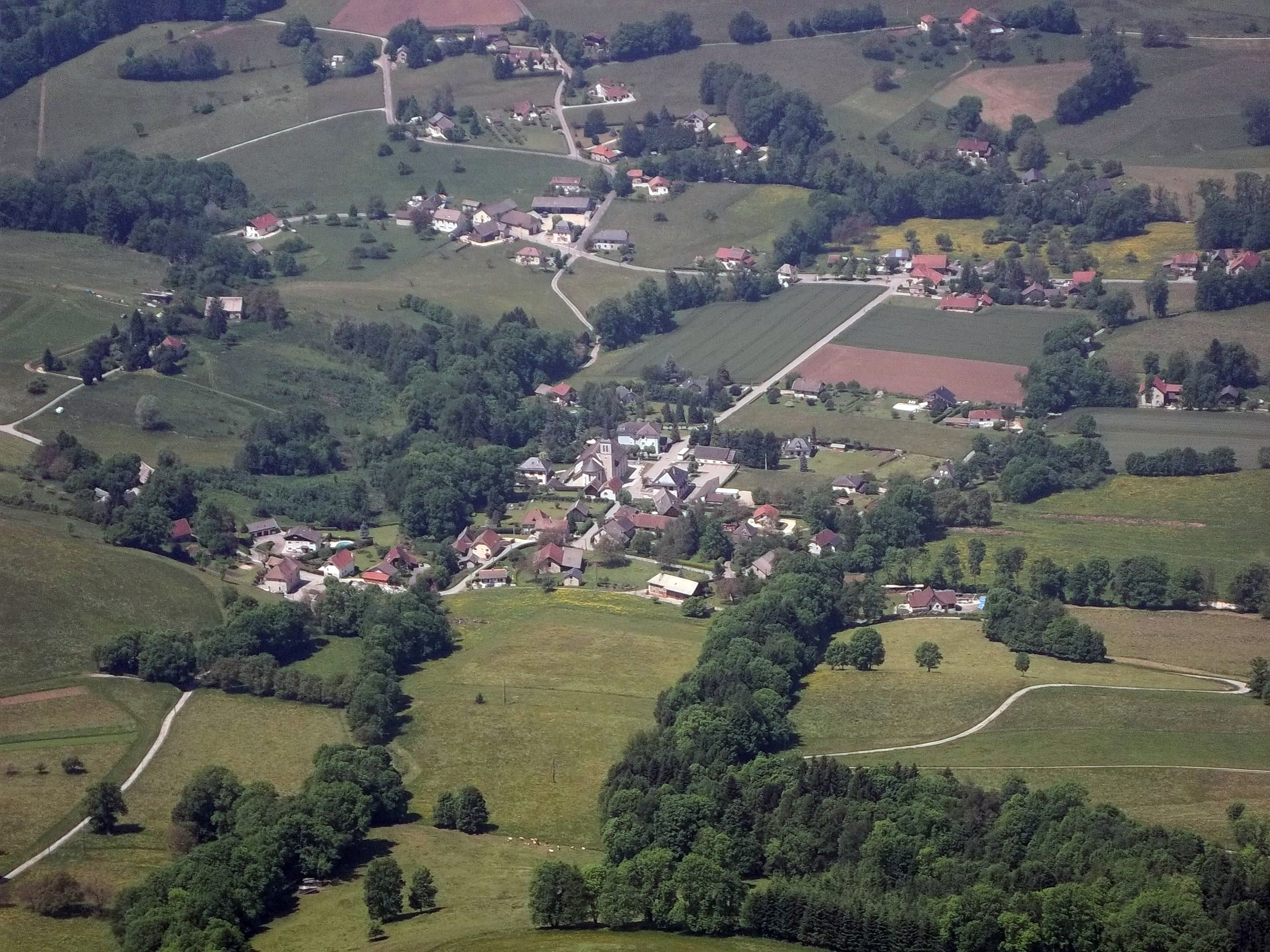
- An aerial view of Attignat-Oncin

- Coat of arms
- Location of Attignat-Oncin
- Location within France Location within Auvergne-Rhône-Alpes
- Coordinates: 45°30′33″N 5°46′35″E
- Country: France
- Region: Auvergne-Rhône-Alpes
- Department: Savoie
- Arrondissement: Chambéry
- Canton: Le Pont-de-Beauvoisin
- Intercommunality: CC Lac d'Aiguebelette

Government
  - Mayor (2020–2026): Thomas Ilbert
- Area^{1}: 18.46 km^{2} (7.13 sq mi)
- Highest elevation: 1,427 m (4,682 ft)
- Lowest elevation: 381 m (1,250 ft)
- Population (2023): 574
  - Density: 31.1/km^{2} (80.5/sq mi)
- Time zone: UTC+01:00 (CET)
  - Summer (DST): UTC+02:00 (CEST)
- INSEE/Postal code: 73022 /73610
- ^{1} French Land Register data, which excludes lakes, ponds, glaciers > 1 km^{2} (0.386 sq mi or 247 acres) and river estuaries.

Attignat-Oncin (French pronunciation: [atiɲa ɔ̃sɛ̃]; Arpitan: Attigna Onshin) is a commune in the Savoie department in the Auvergne-Rhône-Alpes region in south-eastern France.

== See also ==
- Communes of the Savoie department
