= Verel-de-Montbel =

Verel-de-Montbel Verè (Savoyard)
- Commune
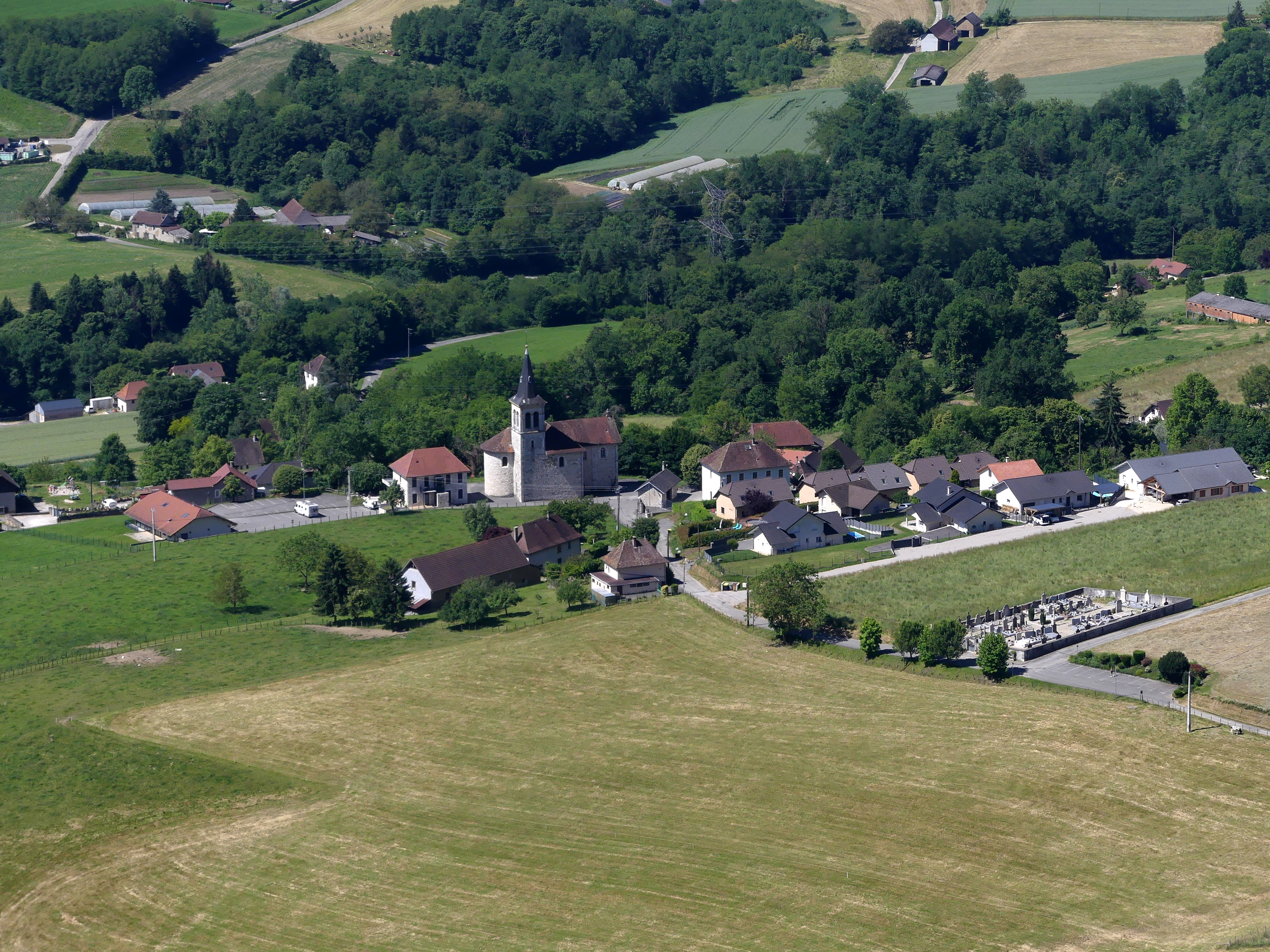
- A general view of Verel-de-Montbel
- Location of Verel-de-Montbel
- Location within France Location within Auvergne-Rhône-Alpes
- Coordinates: 45°33′35″N 5°43′52″E
- Country: France
- Region: Auvergne-Rhône-Alpes
- Department: Savoie
- Arrondissement: Chambéry
- Canton: Le Pont-de-Beauvoisin
- Intercommunality: Val Guiers

Government
  - Mayor (2020–2026): Christian Cevoz-Mami
- Area^{1}: 3.74 km^{2} (1.44 sq mi)
- Highest elevation: 600 m (2,000 ft)
- Lowest elevation: 245 m (804 ft)
- Population (2023): 341
  - Density: 91.2/km^{2} (236/sq mi)
- Time zone: UTC+01:00 (CET)
  - Summer (DST): UTC+02:00 (CEST)
- INSEE/Postal code: 73309 /73330
- ^{1} French Land Register data, which excludes lakes, ponds, glaciers > 1 km^{2} (0.386 sq mi or 247 acres) and river estuaries.

Verel-de-Montbel (French pronunciation: [vəʁɛl də mɔ̃bɛl]; Savoyard: Verè) is a commune in the Savoie department in the Auvergne-Rhône-Alpes region in south-eastern France.

== See also ==
- Communes of the Savoie department
