= Saint-Christophe-sur-Guiers =

- Commune
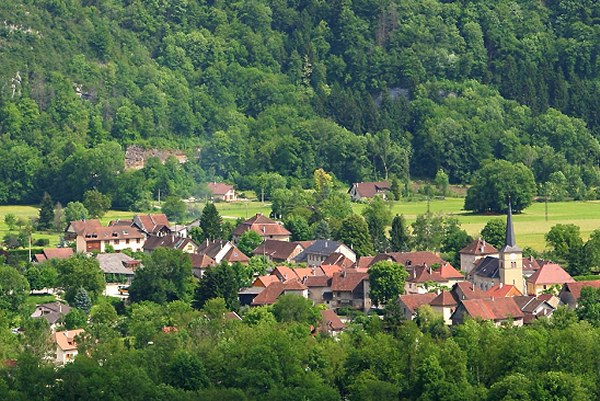
- A general view of Saint-Christophe-sur-Guiers

- Coat of arms
- Location of Saint-Christophe-sur-Guiers
- Location within France Location within Auvergne-Rhône-Alpes
- Coordinates: 45°26′17″N 5°46′29″E
- Country: France
- Region: Auvergne-Rhône-Alpes
- Department: Isère
- Arrondissement: Grenoble
- Canton: Chartreuse-Guiers
- Intercommunality: Cœur de Chartreuse

Government
  - Mayor (2022–2026): Claude Coux
- Area^{1}: 23.54 km^{2} (9.09 sq mi)
- Highest elevation: 1,761 m (5,778 ft)
- Lowest elevation: 386 m (1,266 ft)
- Population (2023): 847
  - Density: 36.0/km^{2} (93.2/sq mi)
- Time zone: UTC+01:00 (CET)
  - Summer (DST): UTC+02:00 (CEST)
- INSEE/Postal code: 38376 /38380
- ^{1} French Land Register data, which excludes lakes, ponds, glaciers > 1 km^{2} (0.386 sq mi or 247 acres) and river estuaries.

Saint-Christophe-sur-Guiers (French pronunciation: [sɛ̃ kʁistɔf syʁ ɡje], literally Saint-Christophe on Guiers) is a commune in the Isère department in southeastern France.

== La Ruchère ==
La Ruchère, rural district, mainly famous for cross country skiing slopes, was attached to Saint-Christophe-sur-Guiers in 1794.

== Population ==
Historical population
Year	Pop.	±% p.a.
1968	442	—
1975	430	−0.39%
1982	599	+4.85%
1990	709	+2.13%
1999	720	+0.17%
2007	773	+0.89%
2012	866	+2.30%
2017	838	−0.66%
2023	847	+0.18%
Source: INSEE

== See also ==
- Communes of the Isère department
