= Saint-Franc =

Saint-Franc San Fran (Savoyard)
- Commune
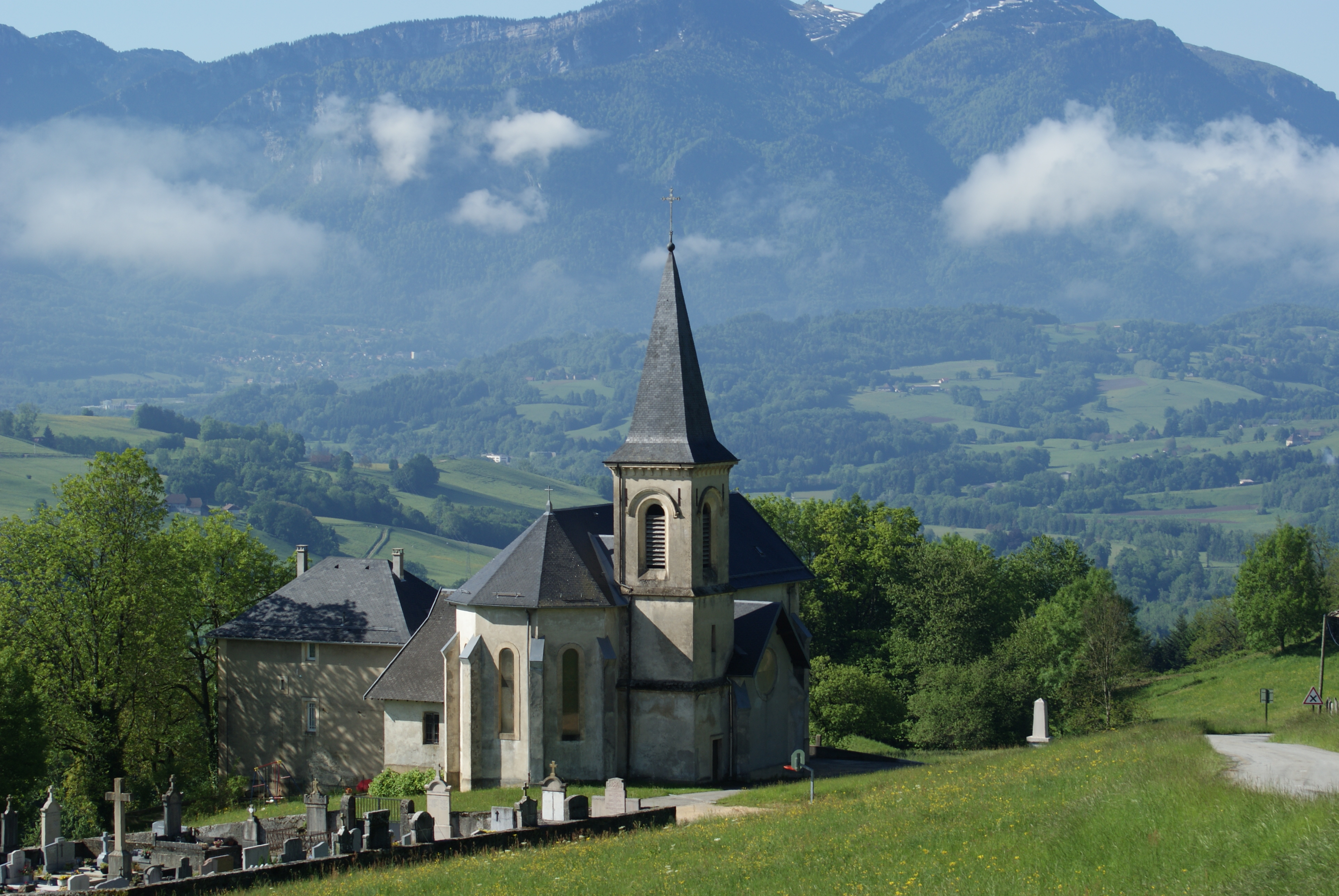
- The church in Saint-Franc
- Location of Saint-Franc
- Location within France Location within Auvergne-Rhône-Alpes
- Coordinates: 45°29′32″N 5°44′48″E
- Country: France
- Region: Auvergne-Rhône-Alpes
- Department: Savoie
- Arrondissement: Chambéry
- Canton: Le Pont-de-Beauvoisin
- Intercommunality: CC Cœur de Chartreuse

Government
  - Mayor (2020–2026): Christiane Broto Simon
- Area^{1}: 7.25 km^{2} (2.80 sq mi)
- Highest elevation: 725 m (2,379 ft)
- Lowest elevation: 320 m (1,050 ft)
- Population (2023): 155
  - Density: 21.4/km^{2} (55.4/sq mi)
- Time zone: UTC+01:00 (CET)
  - Summer (DST): UTC+02:00 (CEST)
- INSEE/Postal code: 73233 /73360
- ^{1} French Land Register data, which excludes lakes, ponds, glaciers > 1 km^{2} (0.386 sq mi or 247 acres) and river estuaries.

Saint-Franc (Savoyard: San Fran) is a commune in the Savoie department in the Auvergne-Rhône-Alpes region in south-eastern France.

== See also ==
- Communes of the Savoie department
