= Saint-Albin-de-Vaulserre =

- Commune
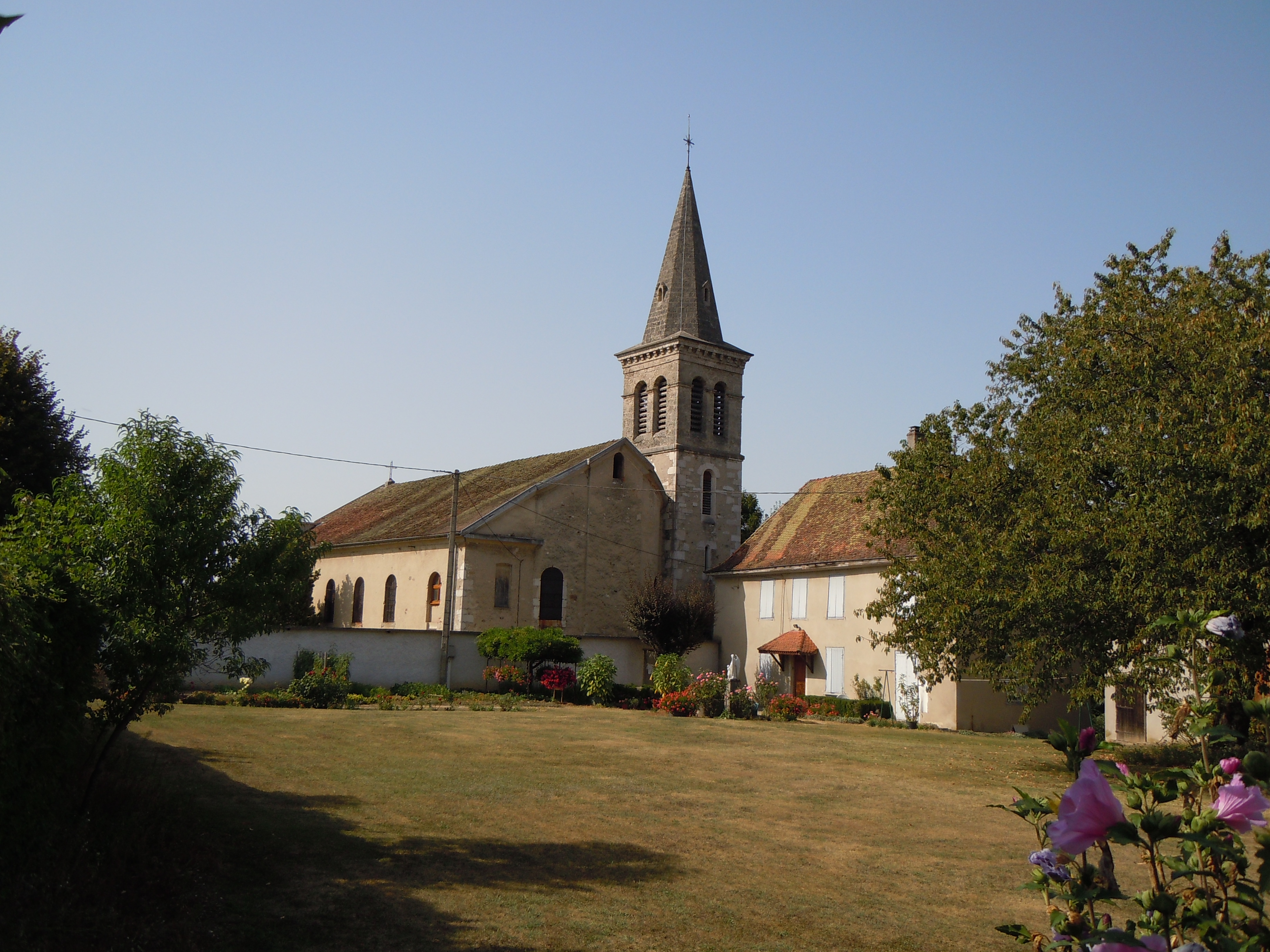
- The church of Saint-Albin-de-Vaulserre

- Coat of arms
- Location of Saint-Albin-de-Vaulserre
- Location within France Location within Auvergne-Rhône-Alpes
- Coordinates: 45°30′20″N 5°42′11″E
- Country: France
- Region: Auvergne-Rhône-Alpes
- Department: Isère
- Arrondissement: La Tour-du-Pin
- Canton: Chartreuse-Guiers

Government
  - Mayor (2020–2026): Cédric Milani
- Area^{1}: 4.99 km^{2} (1.93 sq mi)
- Highest elevation: 522 m (1,713 ft)
- Lowest elevation: 253 m (830 ft)
- Population (2023): 420
  - Density: 84/km^{2} (220/sq mi)
- Time zone: UTC+01:00 (CET)
  - Summer (DST): UTC+02:00 (CEST)
- INSEE/Postal code: 38354 /38480
- ^{1} French Land Register data, which excludes lakes, ponds, glaciers > 1 km^{2} (0.386 sq mi or 247 acres) and river estuaries.

Saint-Albin-de-Vaulserre (French pronunciation: [sɛ̃.t‿albɛ̃ də volsɛʁ]) is a commune in the Isère department in southeastern France.

== Population ==
Historical population
Year	Pop.	±% p.a.
1968	318	—
1975	299	−0.88%
1982	328	+1.33%
1990	351	+0.85%
1999	368	+0.53%
2007	354	−0.48%
2012	389	+1.90%
2017	405	+0.81%
2023	420	+0.61%
Source: INSEE

== See also ==
- Communes of the Isère department
