= Puy-Saint-Martin =

- Commune
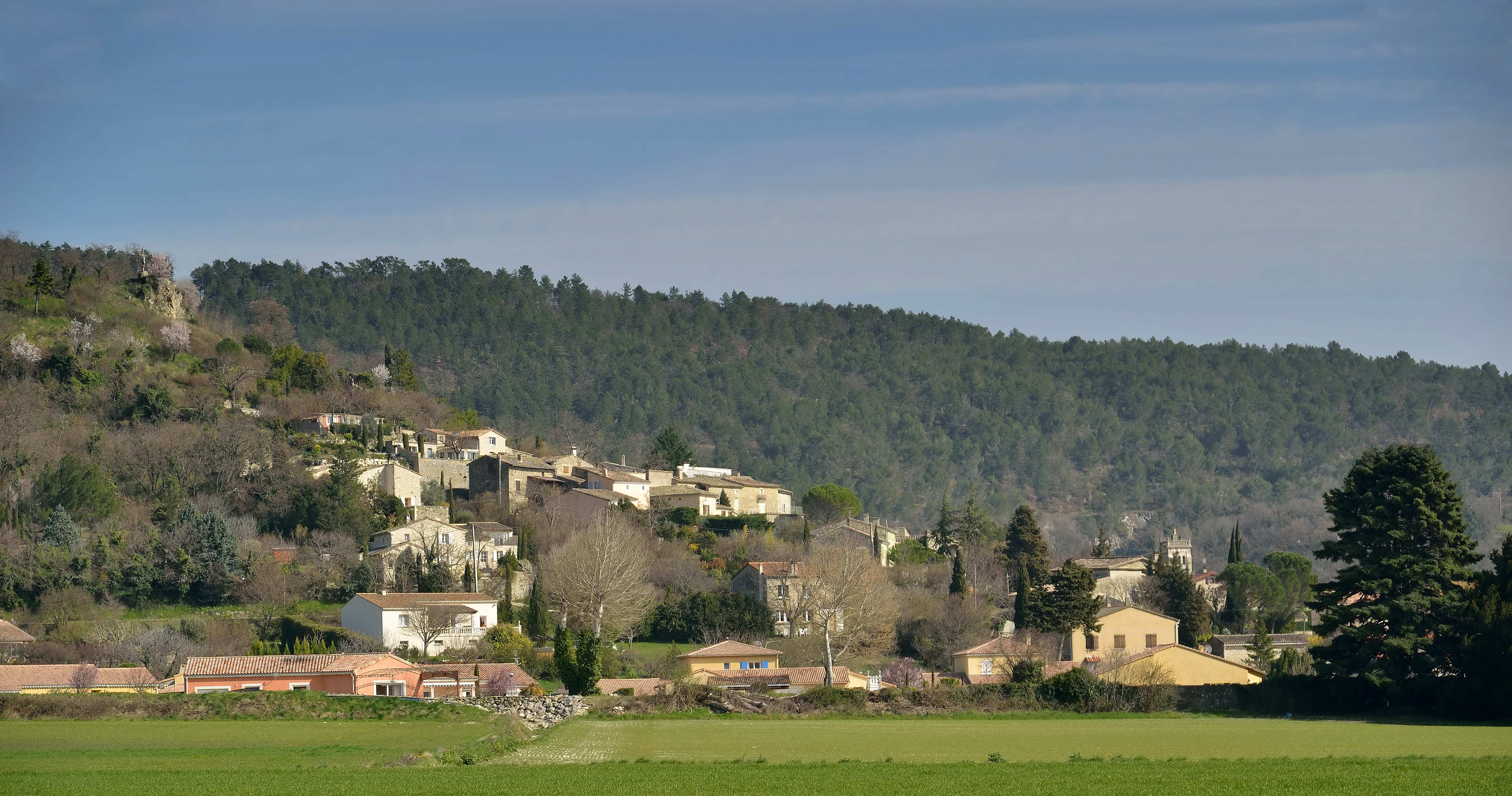
- The village of Puy-Saint-Martin
- Location of Puy-Saint-Martin
- Location within France Location within Auvergne-Rhône-Alpes
- Coordinates: 44°37′45″N 4°58′27″E
- Country: France
- Region: Auvergne-Rhône-Alpes
- Department: Drôme
- Arrondissement: Die
- Canton: Dieulefit
- Intercommunality: Montélimar Agglomération

Government
  - Mayor (2022–2026): Anthony Celerien
- Area^{1}: 11.65 km^{2} (4.50 sq mi)
- Highest elevation: 520 m (1,710 ft)
- Lowest elevation: 177 m (581 ft)
- Population (2023): 827
  - Density: 71.0/km^{2} (184/sq mi)
- Time zone: UTC+01:00 (CET)
  - Summer (DST): UTC+02:00 (CEST)
- INSEE/Postal code: 26258 /26450
- ^{1} French Land Register data, which excludes lakes, ponds, glaciers > 1 km^{2} (0.386 sq mi or 247 acres) and river estuaries.

Puy-Saint-Martin (French pronunciation: [pɥi sɛ̃ maʁtɛ̃]; Vivaro-Alpine: Puèg de Sant Martin) is a commune in the Drôme department in southeastern France.

== Population ==
Historical population
Year	Pop.	±% p.a.
1968	430	—
1975	440	+0.33%
1982	510	+2.13%
1990	602	+2.09%
1999	647	+0.80%
2007	833	+3.21%
2012	846	+0.31%
2017	886	+0.93%
2023	827	−1.14%
Source: INSEE

== See also ==
- Communes of the Drôme department
