= Guiers =

River in eastern France

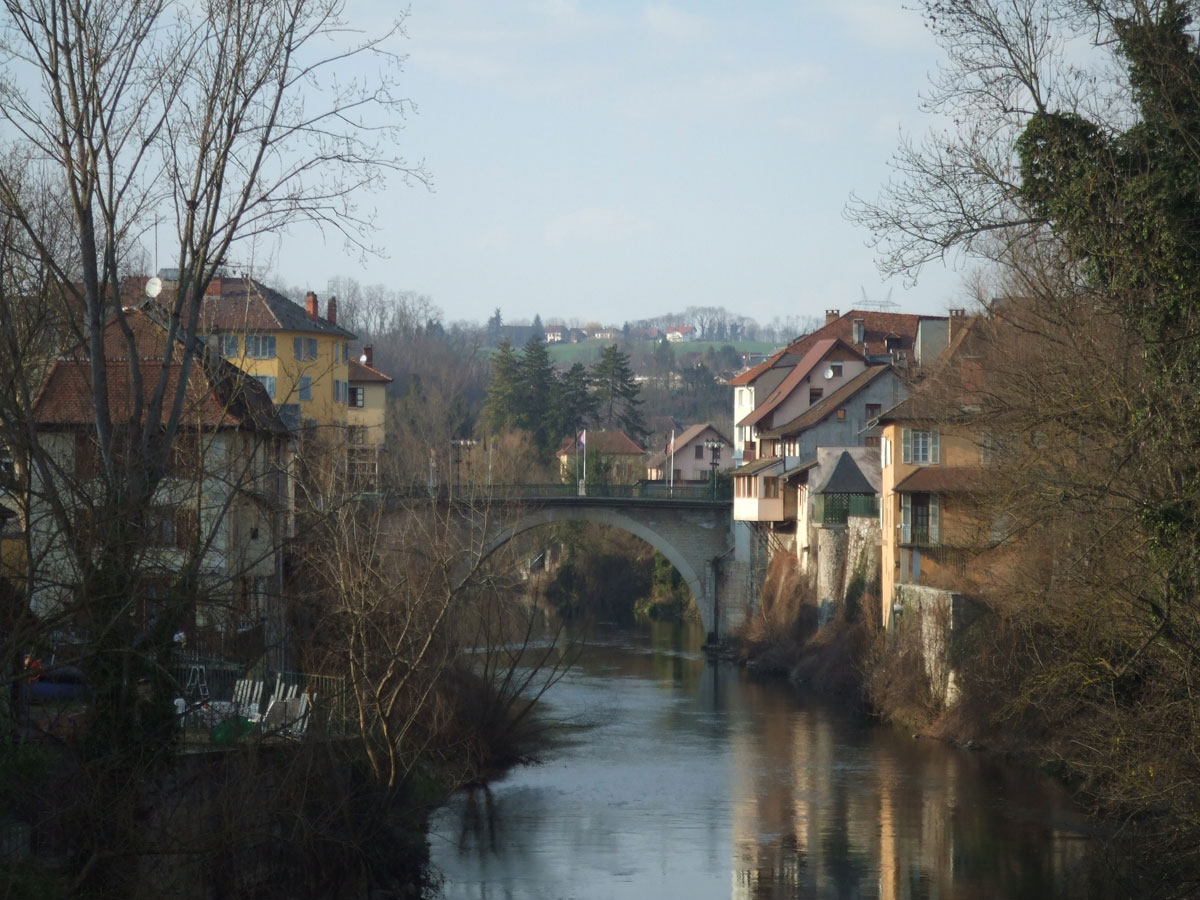
- The Guiers in Le Pont-de-Beauvoisin

- Location within France Location within Auvergne-Rhône-Alpes

Location
- Country: France

Physical characteristics
- Mouth: Rhône
  - coordinates: 45.6126°N 5.6218°E
- Length: 49.9 km (31.0 mi)

Basin features
- Progression: Rhône→ Mediterranean Sea
- Tributaries
  - left: Ainan
  - right: Thiers, Guiers Vif

The Guiers (French pronunciation: [ɡje]) is a river in the Isère and Savoie departments of eastern France. It is 49.9 km (31.0 mi) long. It rises in the Chartreuse Mountains. The part upstream from the confluence with the Guiers Vif (literally Live Guiers) is also called Guiers Mort (literally Dead Guiers).
