= Canton of Albertville-Nord =

Coordinates: 45°41′30″N 6°23′22″E

Albertville-Nord
- Former canton
- Interactive map of Albertville-Nord
- Country: France
- Region: Auvergne-Rhône-Alpes
- Department: Savoie
- No. of communes: {{{nbcomm}}}
- Disbanded: 2015
- Area: 42.5 km^{2} (16.4 sq mi)
- Population (2012): 15,530
  - Density: 365/km^{2} (946/sq mi)

The Canton of Albertville-Nord is a French former administrative subdivision, situated in the Savoie département and the Rhône-Alpes région. It was created in 1973. It was disbanded following the French canton reorganisation which came into effect in March 2015. In 2012, the population was 15,530.

The Canton of Albertville-Nord consisted of the following communes:

- Albertville (partly)
- Allondaz
- Césarches
- Mercury
- Pallud
- Thénésol
- Venthon
