= Espace Diamant =

Group of ski resorts in the French Alps

- Interactive map of Espace Diamant
- Location: Haute-Savoie and Savoie
- Nearest city: Albertville
- Coordinates: 45°47′40″N 6°33′15″E
- Top elevation: 2,069 m (6,788 ft)
- Base elevation: 910 m (2,986 ft)
- Trails: 146
- Lift system: 84
- Website: Les Saisies website Espace Diamant website

Espace Diamant (literally Diamond Space) is a group of French ski resorts, located in the Savoie and Haute-Savoie departments in the French Alps. The ski area has 185 km of slopes for all levels of experience, distributed between the altitudes of 910 and 2069 meters.

It is composed of the following ski resorts:

- Crest-Voland: 16 ski lifts, 28 ski slopes (35 km), 80 km of cross-country skiing;
- Cohennoz;
- Flumet: 8 ski lifts, 20 ski slopes, 3 km of cross-country skiing;
- Notre-Dame-de-Bellecombe: 19 ski lifts, 27 ski slopes, 8 km of cross-country skiing;
- Praz-sur-Arly 6 ski lifts, 26 ski slopes (35 km), 10 km of cross-country skiing; and
- Les Saisies in Hauteluce 34 ski lifts, 40 ski slopes (35 km), 80 km of cross-country skiing.

In addition to alpine skiing, other winter activities such as Nordic skiing, hiking, snowshoeing, and four-season tobogganing are also available. In summer, the Espace Diamant stations offer many activities such as horseback riding, mountain biking, hiking, alpine slides, paragliding, canyoning, and swimming in lakes.

== Slopes ==
- 32 green slopes
- 58 blue slopes
- 47 red slopes
- 10 black slopes
- 185 km (115 mi) slopes total
