= Jeux sans frontières season 19 =

Jeux sans frontières
- Season 19
- No. of teams: 5 countries
- Winner: (Portugal) Madeira
- Runners-up: (Belgium) Profondeville (Spain) Seville
- Head referee: Guido Pancaldi
- No. of episodes: 9

Release
- Original network: RTBF1; Antenne 2; Raiuno; RTP1; TVE1
- Original release: July 1988 – September 1988

Season chronology
- ← Previous; Season 18 Next → Season 20

The 19th season of the international television game show Jeux sans frontières was held in the summer of 1988. Broadcasters from Belgium, France, Italy, Portugal, and Spain participated in the competition coordinated by the European Broadcasting Union (EBU). The different heats were hosted by some of the participant broadcasters in locations in their countries such as Misano Adriatico (Italy), Viana do Castelo (Portugal), Les Saisies (France), and Pozuelo de Alarcón (Spain). The grand final was held in Bellagio (Italy). The head international referee in charge of supervising the competition was Guido Pancaldi.

For each heat, each broadcaster sent a mixed team of twelve members (six men and six women) from a city or town from its country that competed against each other in a series of games –funny physical games played in outlandish costumes, though none-the-less technically difficult– themed in the specific topic of the episode. After the eight heats, the most successful team from each country competed in the grand final. Each of the episodes was presented by the host broadcaster in its own language. Each of the participating broadcasters had their own presenters who did some on-site presentations for their audience and commented on the competition in their language. For this season, due to the complexity of the production, and the fact that each broadcaster had its own personalized coverage, the episodes were filmed first and each broadcaster broadcast them later at their convenience.

The season was won by the team from Madeira, Portugal, the runner-ups being the teams from Profondeville, Belgium, and Seville, Spain.

== Participants ==
Country	Broadcaster	Code	Colour	Cities
Belgium	RTBF	B	Yellow	Virton
Belgium	RTBF	B	Yellow	Pepinster
Belgium	RTBF	B	Yellow	Ath
Belgium	RTBF	B	Yellow	Profondeville
France	Antenne 2	F	Green	Espace Cristal
France	Antenne 2	F	Green	Les Saisies
France	Antenne 2	F	Green	Beaufortain
France	Antenne 2	F	Green	Brides-les-Bains
Italy	RAI	I	Light blue	Rimini & Co.
Italy	RAI	I	Light blue	Putignano
Italy	RAI	I	Light blue	Aosta-Pilaz
Italy	RAI	I	Light blue	Palinuro
Portugal	RTP	P	Orange	Madeira
Portugal	RTP	P	Orange	Mateus (Vila Real)
Portugal	RTP	P	Orange	Viana do Castelo
Portugal	RTP	P	Orange	Azores
Spain	TVE	E	Red	(Asturias) Gijón
Spain	TVE	E	Red	(Region of Murcia) Cartagena
Spain	TVE	E	Red	(Galicia (Spain)) La Coruña
Spain	TVE	E	Red	(Andalusia) Seville

== Heats ==
=== Heat 1 ===
Heat 1 was hosted by RAI at the Autodromo Santa Monica in Misano Adriatico, Italy, was themed about the town and the Adriatic Coast, and was presented by Claudio Lippi with Anna Benni, Lucia Nalli, Maura Musi, Sabrina Picci, and Elisabetta Coraini.

Place	Country	Town	Points
1	P	Madeira	50
2	I	Rimini & Co.	47
3	B	Virton	42
4	E	Gijón	33
5	F	Espace Cristal	32

=== Heat 2 ===
Heat 2 was hosted by Antenne 2 in Les Saisies, France, was themed about television shows, and was presented by Marie-Ange Nardi and Fabrice.

Place	Country	Town	Points
1	P	Mateus (Vila Real)	47
2	F	Les Saisies	42
3	E	Cartagena	38
4	B	Pepinster	37
5	I	Putignano	36

=== Heat 3 ===
Heat 3 was hosted by RTP at the Santa Luzia park in Viana do Castelo, Portugal, was themed about the history of the town, and was presented by Eládio Clímaco, Ivone Ferreira, and José Fialho Gouveia.

Place	Country	Town	Points
1	I	Aosta-Pilaz	49
2	P	Viana do Castelo	45
3	F	Beaufortain	44
4	B	Ath	41
5	E	La Coruña	34

=== Heat 4 ===
Heat 4 was hosted by TVE at the grounds of Prado del Rey in Pozuelo de Alarcón, Spain, acting as if they were in Seville, was themed about the departure of the ships for the New World, and was presented by Guillermo Summers, Ignacio Salas, and Carmen Otero.

Place	Country	Town	Points
1	B	Profondeville	46
2	P	Azores	45
3	E	Seville	35
4	I	Palinuro	34
5	F	Brides-les-Bains	32

=== Heat 5 ===
Heat 5 was hosted by RAI at the Autodromo Santa Monica in Misano Adriatico, Italy, was themed about Italian cinema, and was presented by Claudio Lippi with Anna Benni, Lucia Nalli, Maura Musi, Sabrina Picci, and Elisabetta Coraini.

Place	Country	Town	Points
1	P	Madeira	47
2	B	Virton	45
3	I	Rimini & Co.	43
4	F	Espace Cristal	35
5	E	Gijón	34

=== Heat 6 ===
Heat 6 was hosted by Antenne 2 in Les Saisies, France, was themed about the Olympic Games, and was presented by Marie-Ange Nardi and Fabrice.

Place	Country	Town	Points
1	B	Pepinster	48
2	F	Les Saisies	44
3	P	Mateus (Vila Real)	39
4	E	Cartagena	36
5	I	Putignano	35

=== Heat 7 ===
Heat 7 was hosted by RTP at the Santa Luzia park in Viana do Castelo, Portugal, was themed about Portuguese navigators and explorations, and was presented by Eládio Clímaco, Ivone Ferreira, and José Fialho Gouveia.

Place	Country	Town	Points
1	B	Ath	47
2	I	Aosta-Pilaz	44
3	F	Beaufortain	40
4	P	Viana do Castelo	39
5	E	La Coruña	28

=== Heat 8 ===
Heat 8 was hosted by TVE at the grounds of Prado del Rey in Pozuelo de Alarcón, Spain, acting as if they were in Seville, was themed about the conquest of the New World, and was presented by Guillermo Summers, Ignacio Salas, and Carmen Otero.

Place	Country	Town	Points
1	B	Profondeville	47
2	P	Azores	46
3	E	Seville	41
4	F	Brides-les-Bains	37
5	I	Palinuro	36

=== Qualifiers ===
The points scored by each team in the two heats they competed in were summed up, and the teams with the most points from each country advanced to the grand final:

Country	Town	Points won
P	Madeira	97
B	Profondeville	93
I	Aosta-Pilaz	93
F	Les Saisies	86
E	Seville	76

== Final ==
The final round was hosted by RAI at the shores of Lake Como in Bellagio, Italy, was themed about cinema, and was presented by Claudio Lippi, with Anna Benni, Elisabetta Coraini, and Lucia Nalli.

Place	Country	Town	Points
1	P	Madeira	49
2	B	Profondeville	47
2	E	Seville	47
4	F	Les Saisies	46
5	I	Aosta-Pilaz	36

== Broadcasts ==
Broadcasters and commentators in participating countries
Country	Broadcaster(s)	Channel(s)	Local presenter(s)/Commentator(s)	Ref.
Belgium	RTBF	RTBF1	Sylvie Rigot	
France	Antenne 2		Marie-Ange Nardi; Fabrice	
Italy	RAI	Raiuno	Claudio Lippi	
Portugal	RTP	RTP1	Eládio Clímaco	
Spain	TVE	TVE1	Guillermo Summers; Ignacio Salas	
