= Arly =

River in France

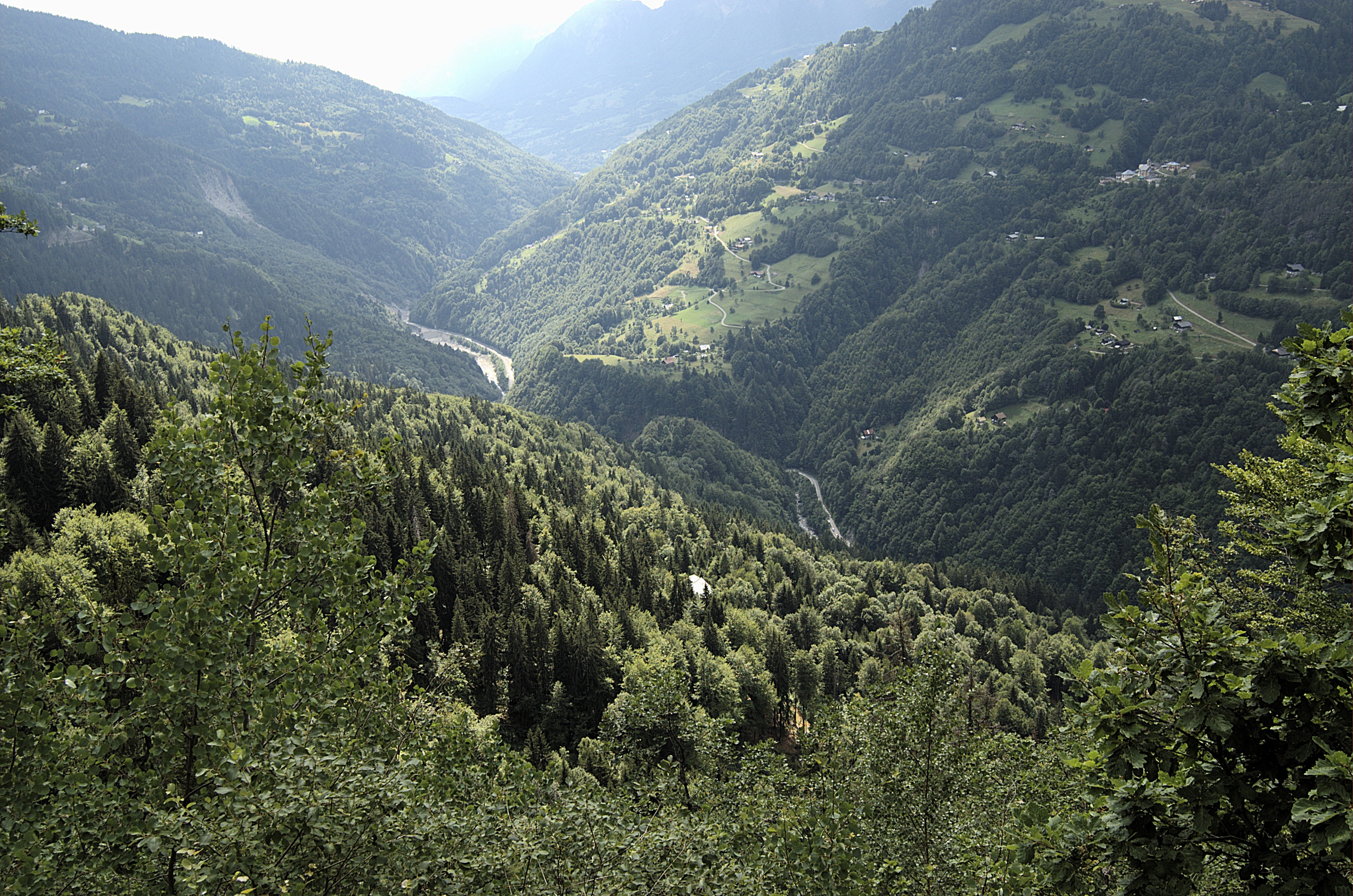
- The Arly Gorge near Cohennoz

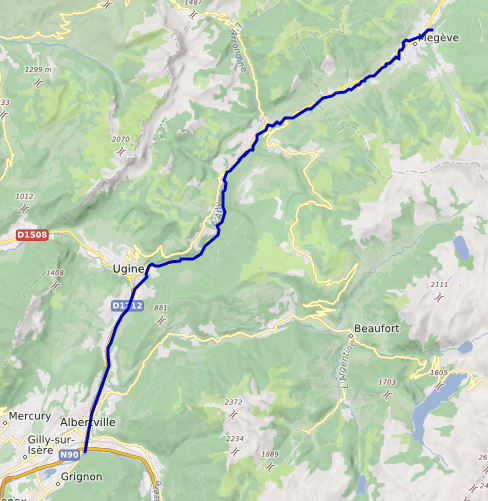

Location
- Country: France

Physical characteristics
- Source
  - location: Mégève
- Mouth: Isère
  - location: Albertville
  - coordinates: 45.6617°N 6.3904°E
- Length: 32 km (20 mi)

Basin features
- Progression: Isère→ Rhône→ Mediterranean Sea

The Arly (French pronunciation: [aʁli]) is a 32.1 km long river in the departments of Savoie and Haute-Savoie, France. It is a tributary of the Isère, which it joins at Albertville.

== Towns crossed by the river ==
- Megève
- Praz-sur-Arly
- Flumet
- Saint-Nicolas-la-Chapelle
- Crest-Voland
- Héry-sur-Ugine
- Cohennoz
- Ugine
- Marthod
- Albertville

== Tributaries ==
- Arrondine
- Flon
- Chaise
- Doron de Beaufort

== See also ==
- Rivers of France
