= Arrondissement of Albertville =

Coordinates: 45°40′00″N 6°23′15″E

Albertville
- Arrondissement
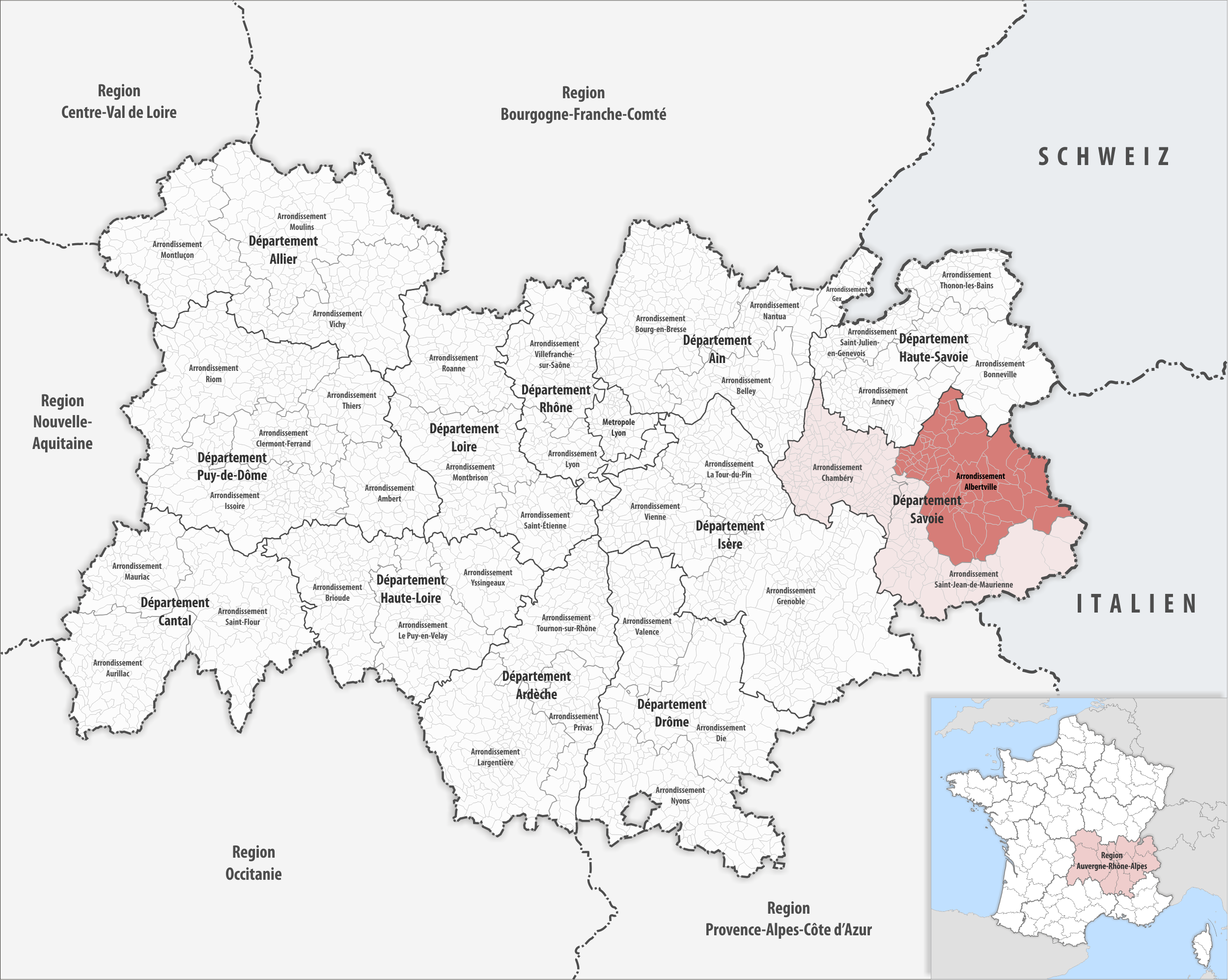
- Location within the region Auvergne-Rhône-Alpes
- Country: France
- Region: Auvergne-Rhône-Alpes
- Department: Savoie
- No. of communes: {{{nbcomm}}}
- Area: 2,466.1 km^{2} (952.2 sq mi)
- Population (2023): 112,684
  - Density: 45.693/km^{2} (118.34/sq mi)
- INSEE code: 731

The arrondissement of Albertville is an arrondissement of France in the Savoie department in the Auvergne-Rhône-Alpes region. It has 69 communes. Its population is 112,228 (2021), and its area is 2,466.1 km^{2} (952.2 sq mi).

== Composition ==
The communes of the arrondissement of Albertville, and their INSEE codes, are:

1. Aime-la-Plagne (73006)
2. Albertville (73011)
3. Allondaz (73014)
4. Les Allues (73015)
5. Les Avanchers-Valmorel (73024)
6. La Bâthie (73032)
7. Beaufort (73034)
8. Les Belleville (73257)
9. Bonvillard (73048)
10. Bourg-Saint-Maurice (73054)
11. Bozel (73055)
12. Brides-les-Bains (73057)
13. Césarches (73061)
14. Cevins (73063)
15. Champagny-en-Vanoise (73071)
16. Les Chapelles (73077)
17. Cléry (73086)
18. Cohennoz (73088)
19. Courchevel (73227)
20. Crest-Voland (73094)
21. Esserts-Blay (73110)
22. Feissons-sur-Salins (73113)
23. Flumet (73114)
24. Frontenex (73121)
25. La Giettaz (73123)
26. Gilly-sur-Isère (73124)
27. Grand-Aigueblanche (73003)
28. Grésy-sur-Isère (73129)
29. Grignon (73130)
30. Hautecour (73131)
31. Hauteluce (73132)
32. Landry (73142)
33. La Léchère (73187)
34. Marthod (73153)
35. Mercury (73154)
36. Montagny (73161)
37. Montailleur (73162)
38. Monthion (73170)
39. Montvalezan (73176)
40. Moûtiers (73181)
41. Notre-Dame-de-Bellecombe (73186)
42. Notre-Dame-des-Millières (73188)
43. Notre-Dame-du-Pré (73190)
44. Pallud (73196)
45. Peisey-Nancroix (73197)
46. La Plagne-Tarentaise (73150)
47. Planay (73201)
48. Plancherine (73202)
49. Pralognan-la-Vanoise (73206)
50. Queige (73211)
51. Rognaix (73216)
52. Sainte-Foy-Tarentaise (73232)
53. Sainte-Hélène-sur-Isère (73241)
54. Saint-Marcel (73253)
55. Saint-Nicolas-la-Chapelle (73262)
56. Saint-Paul-sur-Isère (73268)
57. Saint-Vital (73283)
58. Salins-Fontaine (73284)
59. Séez (73285)
60. Thénésol (73292)
61. Tignes (73296)
62. Tournon (73297)
63. Tours-en-Savoie (73298)
64. Ugine (73303)
65. Val-d'Isère (73304)
66. Venthon (73308)
67. Verrens-Arvey (73312)
68. Villard-sur-Doron (73317)
69. Villaroger (73323)

== History ==
The arrondissement of Albertville was created in 1860.

As a result of the reorganisation of the cantons of France which came into effect in 2015, the borders of the cantons are no longer related to the borders of the arrondissements. The cantons of the arrondissement of Albertville were, as of January 2015:

1. Aime
2. Albertville-Nord
3. Albertville-Sud
4. Beaufort
5. Bourg-Saint-Maurice
6. Bozel
7. Grésy-sur-Isère
8. Moûtiers
9. Ugine
