= Communauté d'agglomération Arlysère =

Arlysère
- Communauté d'agglomération
- Interactive map of Arlysère
- Coordinates: 45°42′N 06°27′E
- Country: France
- Region: Auvergne-Rhône-Alpes
- Department: Savoie
- No. of communes: {{{nbcomm}}}
- Established: 2017
- Area: 763.6 km^{2} (294.8 sq mi)
- Population (2019): 61,292
  - Density: 80.27/km^{2} (207.9/sq mi)
- Website: www.arlysere.fr

Communauté d'agglomération Arlysère is the communauté d'agglomération, an intercommunal structure, centred on the town of Albertville. It is located in the Savoie department, in the Auvergne-Rhône-Alpes region, southeastern France. Created in 2017, its seat is in Albertville. The name Arlysère refers to the rivers Arly and Isère. Its area is 763.6 km^{2}. Its population was 61,292 in 2019, of which 19,502 in Albertville proper.

== Composition ==
The communauté d'agglomération consists of the following 39 communes:

1. Albertville
2. Allondaz
3. La Bâthie
4. Beaufort
5. Bonvillard
6. Césarches
7. Cevins
8. Cléry
9. Cohennoz
10. Crest-Voland
11. Esserts-Blay
12. Flumet
13. Frontenex
14. La Giettaz
15. Gilly-sur-Isère
16. Grésy-sur-Isère
17. Grignon
18. Hauteluce
19. Marthod
20. Mercury
21. Montailleur
22. Monthion
23. Notre-Dame-de-Bellecombe
24. Notre-Dame-des-Millières
25. Pallud
26. Plancherine
27. Queige
28. Rognaix
29. Sainte-Hélène-sur-Isère
30. Saint-Nicolas-la-Chapelle
31. Saint-Paul-sur-Isère
32. Saint-Vital
33. Thénésol
34. Tournon
35. Tours-en-Savoie
36. Ugine
37. Venthon
38. Verrens-Arvey
39. Villard-sur-Doron
