= Chaise (river) =

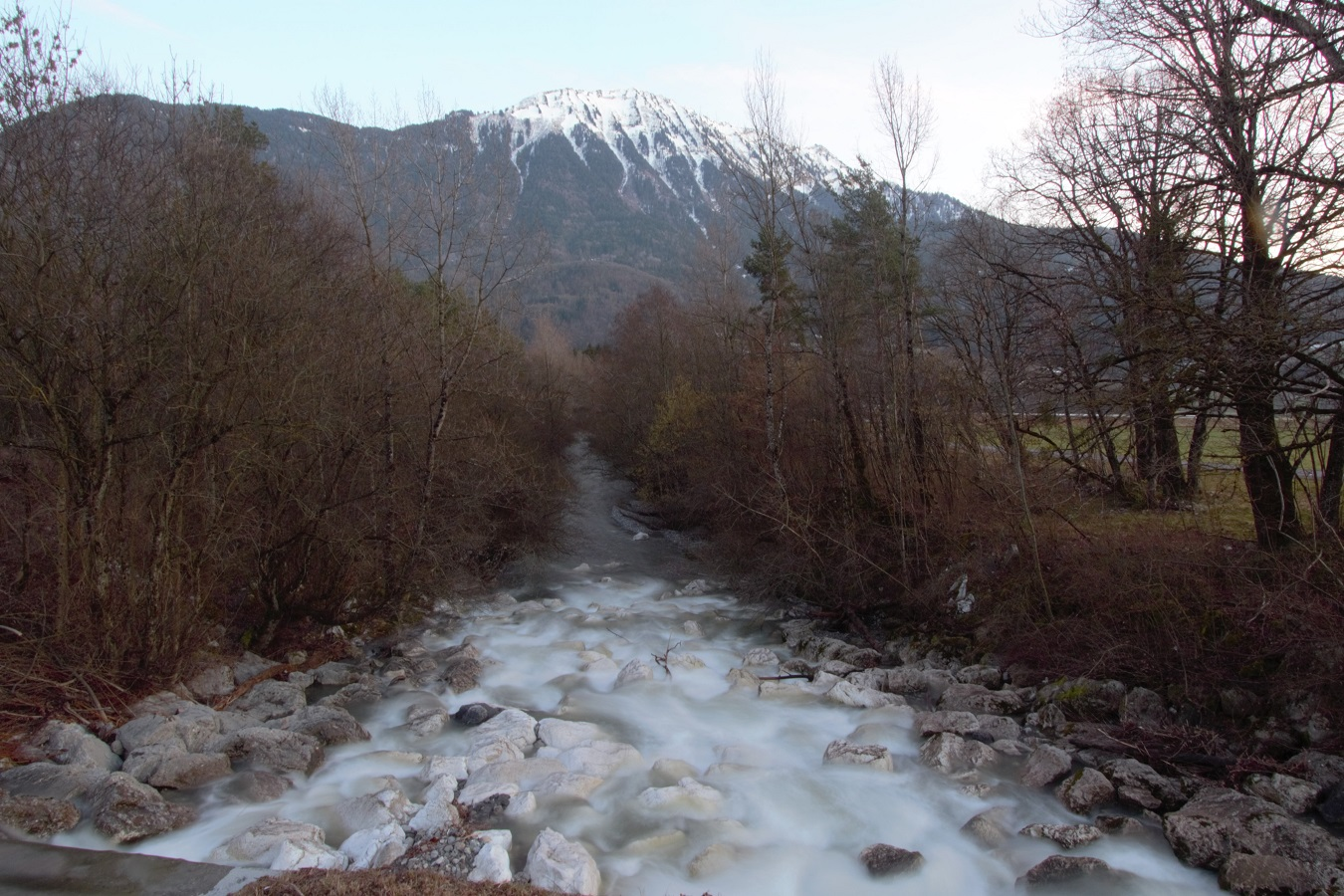
- The Chaise river near Saint-Ferréol

- Location within France Location within Auvergne-Rhône-Alpes

Location
- Country: France

Physical characteristics
- Mouth
  - location: Arly
  - coordinates: 45°44′17″N 6°25′26″E
- Length: 24 km (15 mi)

Basin features
- Progression: Arly→ Isère→ Rhône→ Mediterranean Sea

The Chaise (French pronunciation: [ʃɛz]), also known as the Monthoux, is a 23.8 km long mountain river of eastern France. It flows through the departments Savoie and Haute-Savoie. It is a right tributary of the Arly which it joins in Ugine where, in the mid nineteenth century, it was crossed by a wooden bridge.
