= Saint-Vital =

- Commune
- Coat of arms
- Location of Saint-Vital
- Location within France Location within Auvergne-Rhône-Alpes
- Coordinates: 45°37′41″N 6°17′56″E
- Country: France
- Region: Auvergne-Rhône-Alpes
- Department: Savoie
- Arrondissement: Albertville
- Canton: Albertville-2
- Intercommunality: CA Arlysère

Government
  - Mayor (2020–2026): Serge Dal Bianco
- Area^{1}: 3.6 km^{2} (1.4 sq mi)
- Highest elevation: 602 m (1,975 ft)
- Lowest elevation: 304 m (997 ft)
- Population (2023): 767
  - Density: 210/km^{2} (550/sq mi)
- Time zone: UTC+01:00 (CET)
  - Summer (DST): UTC+02:00 (CEST)
- INSEE/Postal code: 73283 /73460
- ^{1} French Land Register data, which excludes lakes, ponds, glaciers > 1 km^{2} (0.386 sq mi or 247 acres) and river estuaries.

Saint-Vital (French pronunciation: [sɛ̃ vital]) is a commune in the Savoie department in the Auvergne-Rhône-Alpes region in south-eastern France.

== See also ==
- Communes of the Savoie department
