= Monthion =

- Commune
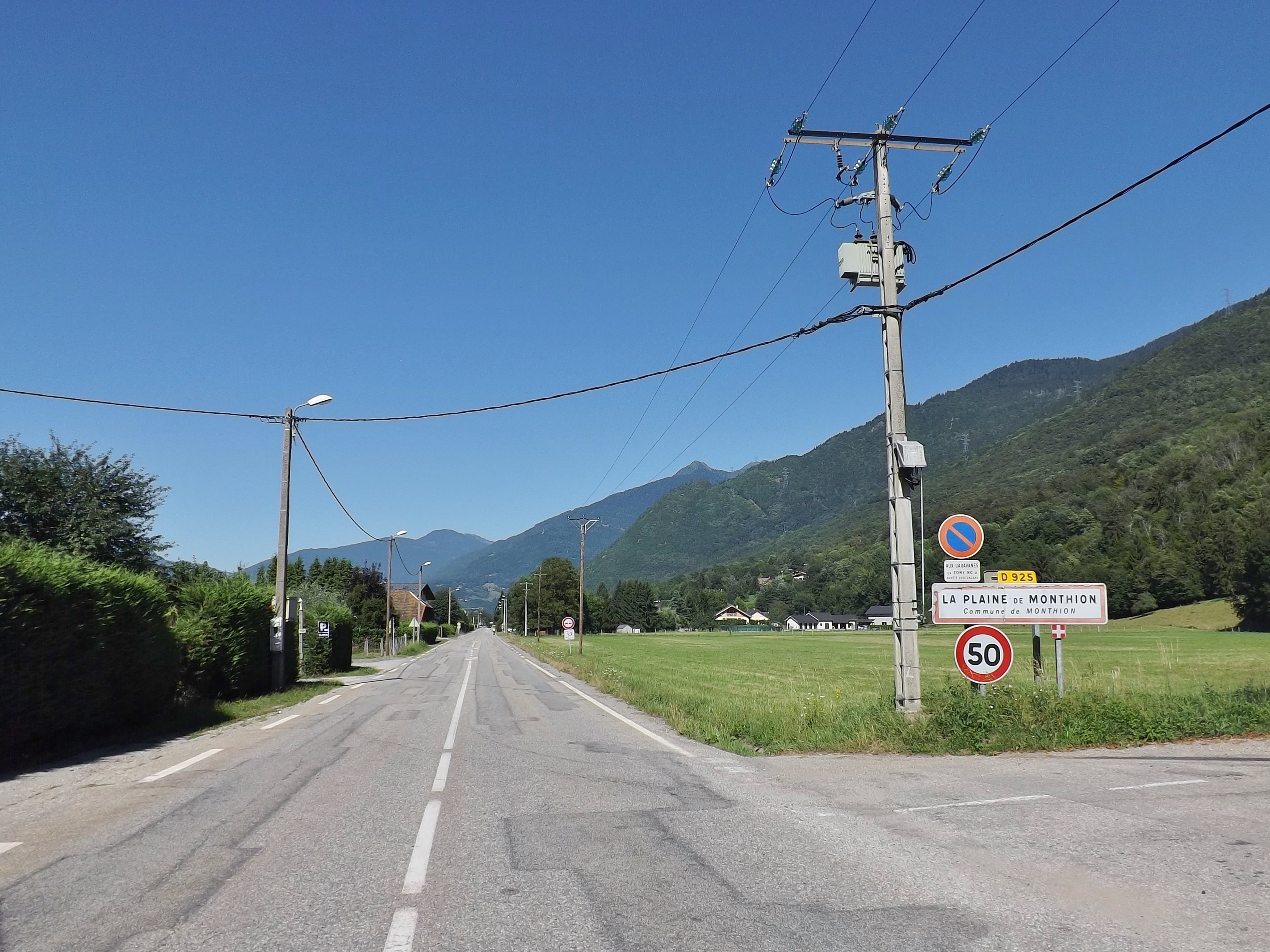
- The D925 road into Monthion
- Location of Monthion
- Location within France Location within Auvergne-Rhône-Alpes
- Coordinates: 45°37′55″N 6°21′33″E
- Country: France
- Region: Auvergne-Rhône-Alpes
- Department: Savoie
- Arrondissement: Albertville
- Canton: Albertville-2
- Intercommunality: CA Arlysère

Government
  - Mayor (2020–2026): Jean-Claude Lavoine
- Area^{1}: 6.36 km^{2} (2.46 sq mi)
- Highest elevation: 2,048 m (6,719 ft)
- Lowest elevation: 319 m (1,047 ft)
- Population (2023): 520
  - Density: 82/km^{2} (210/sq mi)
- Time zone: UTC+01:00 (CET)
  - Summer (DST): UTC+02:00 (CEST)
- INSEE/Postal code: 73170 /73200
- Website: www.monthion.com
- ^{1} French Land Register data, which excludes lakes, ponds, glaciers > 1 km^{2} (0.386 sq mi or 247 acres) and river estuaries.

Monthion is a commune in the Savoie department in the Auvergne-Rhône-Alpes region in south-eastern France. It is part of the urban area of Albertville.

== See also ==
- Communes of the Savoie department
