= Villard-sur-Doron =

- Commune
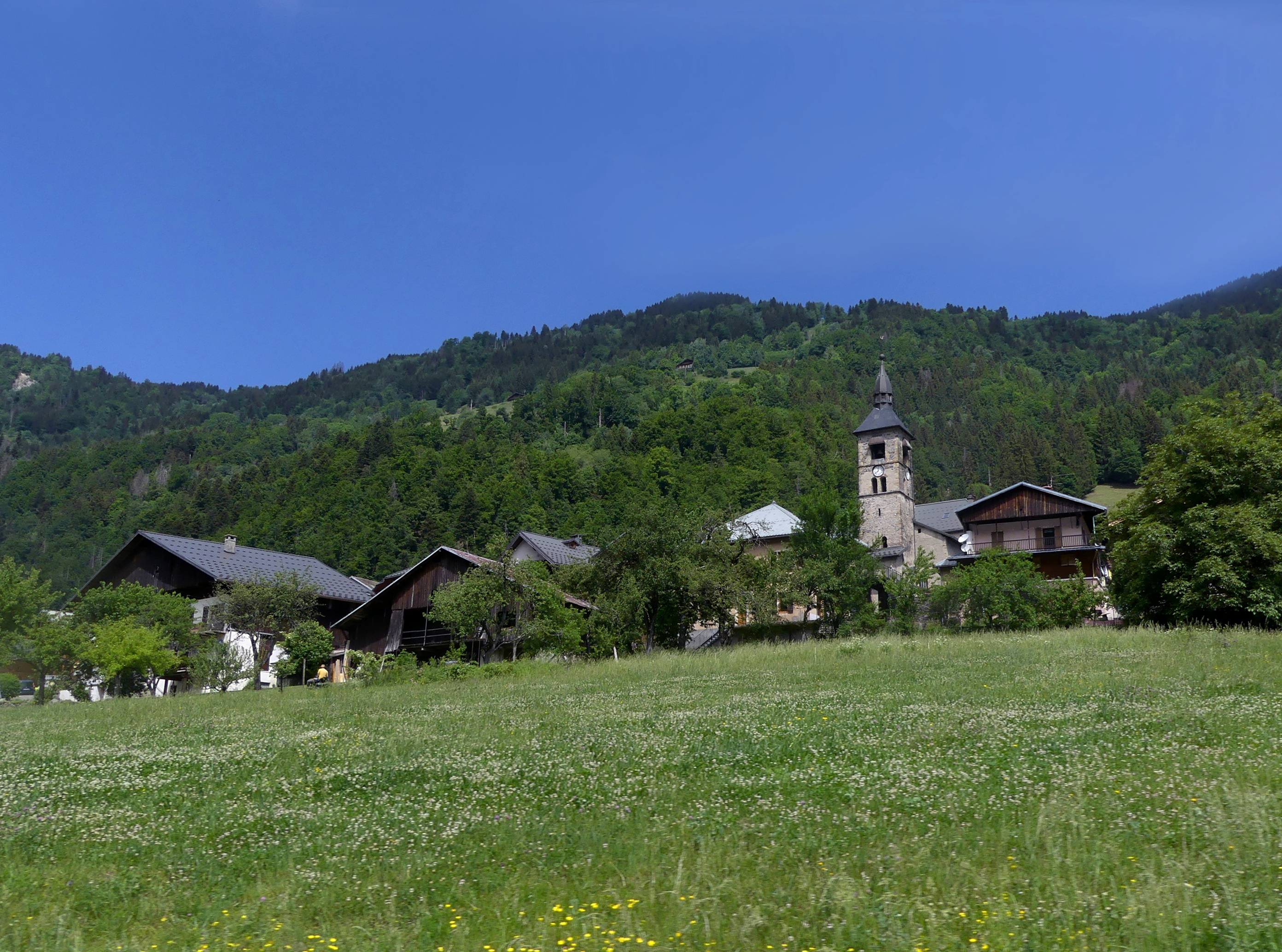
- Location of Villard-sur-Doron
- Location within France Location within Auvergne-Rhône-Alpes
- Coordinates: 45°43′39″N 6°31′45″E
- Country: France
- Region: Auvergne-Rhône-Alpes
- Department: Savoie
- Arrondissement: Albertville
- Canton: Ugine
- Intercommunality: CA Arlysère

Government
  - Mayor (2020–2026): Emmanuel Huguet
- Area^{1}: 22.21 km^{2} (8.58 sq mi)
- Highest elevation: 2,280 m (7,480 ft)
- Lowest elevation: 627 m (2,057 ft)
- Population (2023): 702
  - Density: 31.6/km^{2} (81.9/sq mi)
- Time zone: UTC+01:00 (CET)
  - Summer (DST): UTC+02:00 (CEST)
- INSEE/Postal code: 73317 /73270
- ^{1} French Land Register data, which excludes lakes, ponds, glaciers > 1 km^{2} (0.386 sq mi or 247 acres) and river estuaries.

Villard-sur-Doron is a commune in the Savoie department in the Auvergne-Rhône-Alpes region in south-eastern France.

== See also ==
- Communes of the Savoie department
