= Notre-Dame-des-Millières =

- Commune
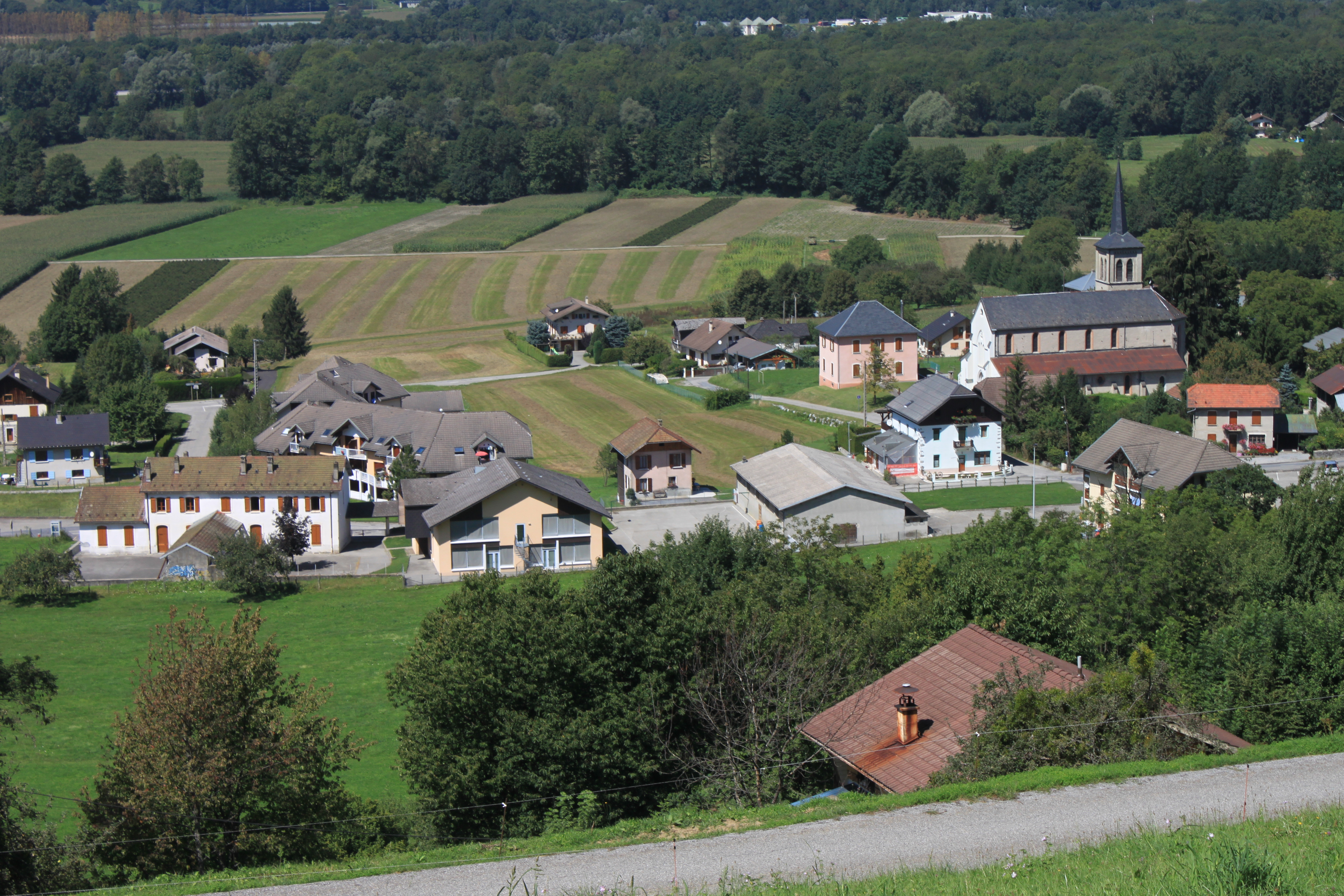
- A general view of Notre-Dame-des-Millières
- Location of Notre-Dame-des-Millières
- Location within France Location within Auvergne-Rhône-Alpes
- Coordinates: 45°37′39″N 6°20′41″E
- Country: France
- Region: Auvergne-Rhône-Alpes
- Department: Savoie
- Arrondissement: Albertville
- Canton: Albertville-2
- Intercommunality: CA Arlysère

Government
  - Mayor (2020–2026): André Vairetto
- Area^{1}: 10.35 km^{2} (4.00 sq mi)
- Highest elevation: 2,279 m (7,477 ft)
- Lowest elevation: 311 m (1,020 ft)
- Population (2023): 988
  - Density: 95.5/km^{2} (247/sq mi)
- Time zone: UTC+01:00 (CET)
  - Summer (DST): UTC+02:00 (CEST)
- INSEE/Postal code: 73188 /73460
- ^{1} French Land Register data, which excludes lakes, ponds, glaciers > 1 km^{2} (0.386 sq mi or 247 acres) and river estuaries.

Notre-Dame-des-Millières is a commune in the Savoie department in the Auvergne-Rhône-Alpes region in south-eastern France.

== See also ==
- Communes of the Savoie department
