= Bonvillard =

- Commune
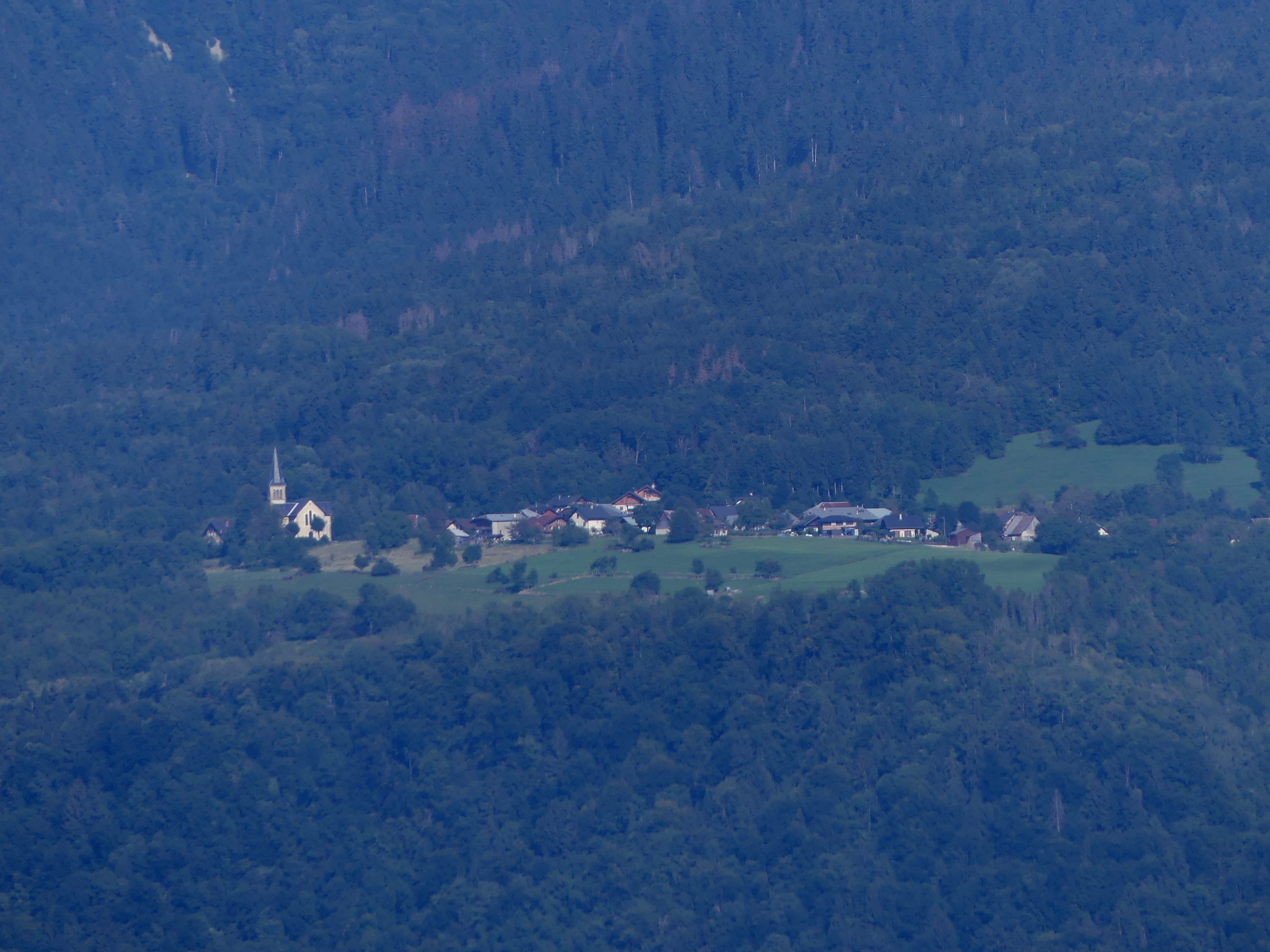
- Bonvillard seen from the Fortress of Miolans.
- Location of Bonvillard
- Location within France Location within Auvergne-Rhône-Alpes
- Coordinates: 45°35′15″N 6°18′21″E
- Country: France
- Region: Auvergne-Rhône-Alpes
- Department: Savoie
- Arrondissement: Albertville
- Canton: Albertville-2
- Intercommunality: CA Arlysère

Government
  - Mayor (2020–2026): Jean-Claude Hugonin
- Area^{1}: 17.1 km^{2} (6.6 sq mi)
- Highest elevation: 2,480 m (8,140 ft)
- Lowest elevation: 380 m (1,250 ft)
- Population (2023): 351
  - Density: 20.5/km^{2} (53.2/sq mi)
- Time zone: UTC+01:00 (CET)
  - Summer (DST): UTC+02:00 (CEST)
- INSEE/Postal code: 73048 /73460
- ^{1} French Land Register data, which excludes lakes, ponds, glaciers > 1 km^{2} (0.386 sq mi or 247 acres) and river estuaries.

Bonvillard is a commune in the Savoie department in the Auvergne-Rhône-Alpes region in south-eastern France.

== See also ==
- Communes of the Savoie department
