= Queige =

- Commune
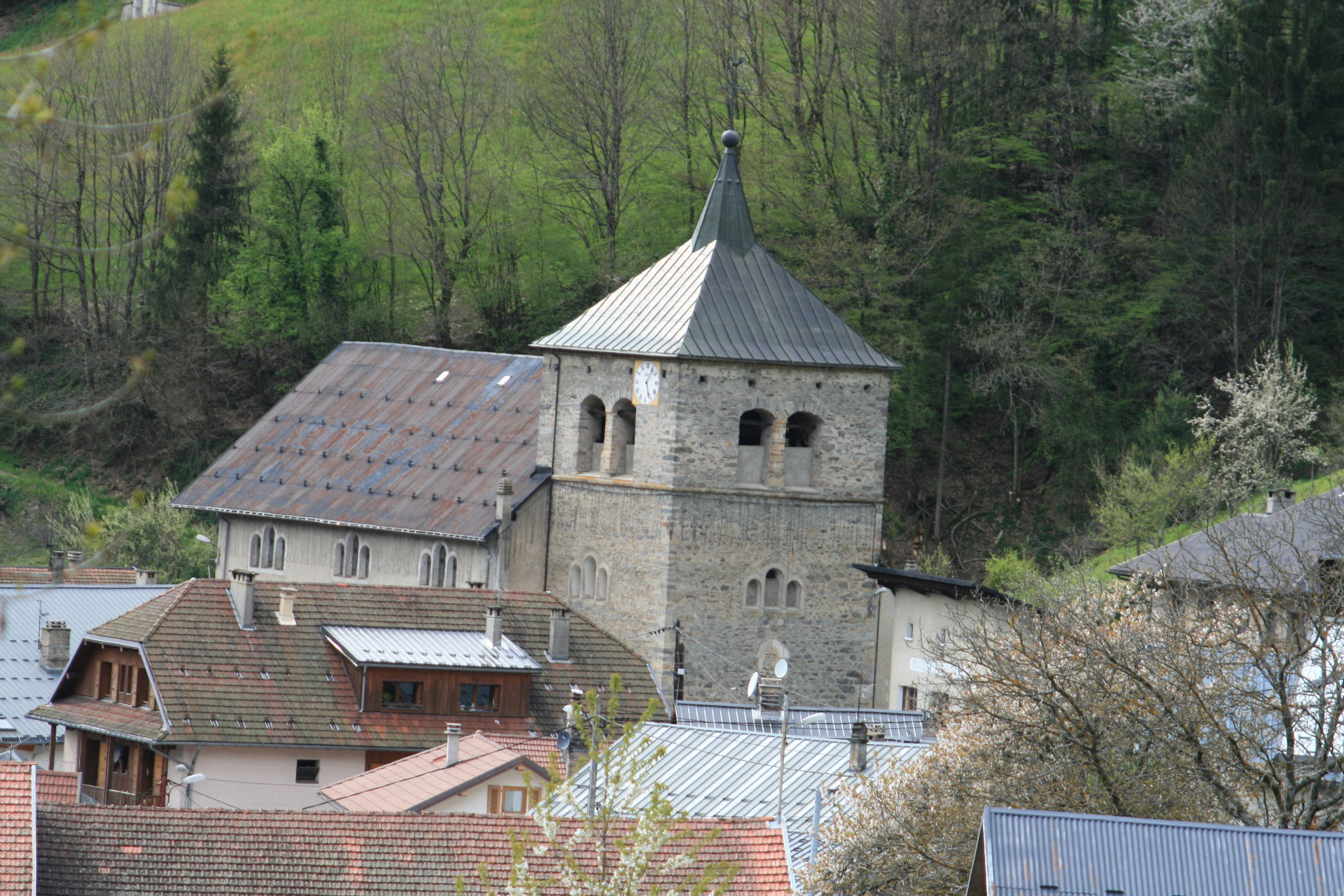
- The church in Queige
- Location of Queige
- Location within France Location within Auvergne-Rhône-Alpes
- Coordinates: 45°43′13″N 6°27′35″E
- Country: France
- Region: Auvergne-Rhône-Alpes
- Department: Savoie
- Arrondissement: Albertville
- Canton: Ugine
- Intercommunality: CA Arlysère

Government
  - Mayor (2020–2026): Edouard Meunier
- Area^{1}: 32.61 km^{2} (12.59 sq mi)
- Highest elevation: 2,440 m (8,010 ft)
- Lowest elevation: 424 m (1,391 ft)
- Population (2023): 904
  - Density: 27.7/km^{2} (71.8/sq mi)
- Time zone: UTC+01:00 (CET)
  - Summer (DST): UTC+02:00 (CEST)
- INSEE/Postal code: 73211 /73720
- Website: www.queige.fr
- ^{1} French Land Register data, which excludes lakes, ponds, glaciers > 1 km^{2} (0.386 sq mi or 247 acres) and river estuaries.

Queige (French pronunciation: [kɛʒ]) is a commune in the Savoie department in the Auvergne-Rhône-Alpes region in south-eastern France.

== Population ==
Historical population
Year	Pop.	±% p.a.
1968	758	—
1975	667	−1.81%
1982	642	−0.54%
1990	716	+1.37%
1999	735	+0.29%
2007	845	+1.76%
2012	851	+0.14%
2017	805	−1.11%
2023	904	+1.95%
Source: INSEE

== See also ==
- Communes of the Savoie department
