= Les Saisies =

Ski resort in the French Alps

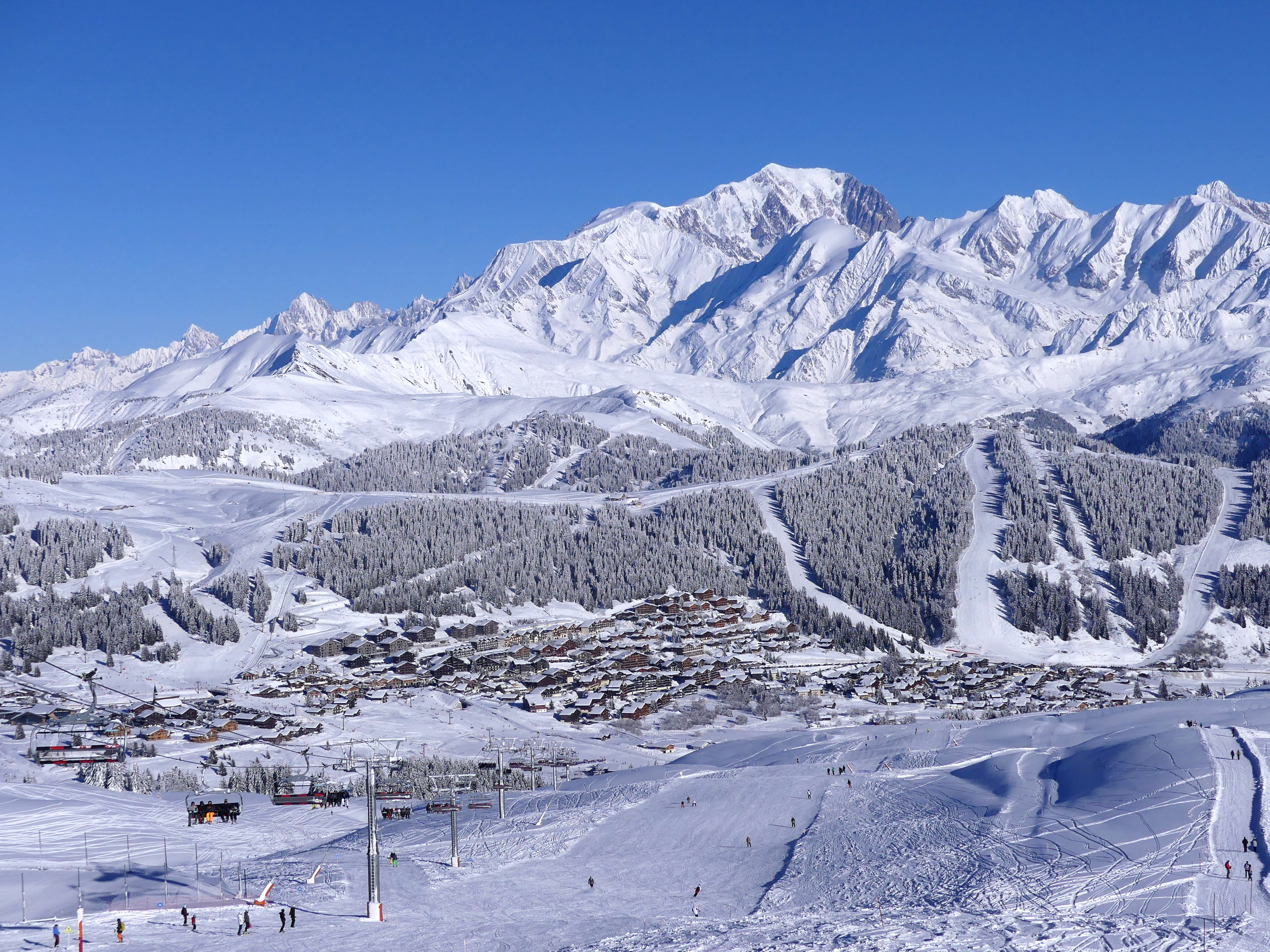
- Les Saisies and Mont Blanc from the top of the Bisanne chair lift

- Location within France Location within Auvergne-Rhône-Alpes Location within Alps
- Location: Hauteluce, Savoie, Auvergne-Rhône-Alpes, France
- Nearest city: Albertville
- Coordinates: 45°45′26″N 6°32′21″E
- Top elevation: 2,050 m (6,730 ft)
- Base elevation: 1,180 m (3,870 ft)
- Trails: 60
- Total length: 77 km (48 mi)
- Website: www.lessaisies.com

Les Saisies is a ski resort located in Hauteluce, Savoie, France. It is 30 km (19 mi) from Albertville, host of the 1992 Winter Olympics. For those games, the resort hosted the biathlon and cross-country skiing events.

The resort also has alpine skiing trails for use and forms part of the Espace Diamant skiing region.

Les Saisies organized the 2014 European Company Sports Games.

== Geography ==
=== Climate ===
Les Saisies has a subarctic climate (Köppen climate classification Dfc) closely bordering on a humid continental climate (Dfb). The average annual temperature in Les Saisies is 5.2 °C (41.4 °F). The average annual rainfall is 1,523.1 mm (59.96 in) with May as the wettest month. The temperatures are highest on average in August, at around 13.4 °C (56.1 °F), and lowest in February, at around −2.3 °C (27.9 °F). The highest temperature ever recorded in Les Saisies was 29.6 °C (85.3 °F) on 27 June 2019; the coldest temperature ever recorded was −25.4 °C (−13.7 °F) on 5 February 2012.

Climate data for Les Saisies (Col des Saisies, altitude 1,614 m (5,295 ft), 1991−2020 normals, extremes 1992−present)
Month	Jan	Feb	Mar	Apr	May	Jun	Jul	Aug	Sep	Oct	Nov	Dec	Year
Record high °C (°F)	16.1 (61.0)	15.2 (59.4)	17.1 (62.8)	18.8 (65.8)	23.7 (74.7)	29.6 (85.3)	28.3 (82.9)	27.9 (82.2)	23.5 (74.3)	22.2 (72.0)	18.7 (65.7)	16.1 (61.0)	29.6 (85.3)
Mean daily maximum °C (°F)	2.1 (35.8)	2.3 (36.1)	5.0 (41.0)	7.4 (45.3)	11.6 (52.9)	15.8 (60.4)	17.9 (64.2)	17.8 (64.0)	13.9 (57.0)	10.8 (51.4)	5.4 (41.7)	2.7 (36.9)	9.4 (48.9)
Daily mean °C (°F)	−2.1 (28.2)	−2.3 (27.9)	0.4 (32.7)	3.3 (37.9)	7.5 (45.5)	11.5 (52.7)	13.4 (56.1)	13.4 (56.1)	9.7 (49.5)	6.7 (44.1)	1.7 (35.1)	−1.2 (29.8)	5.2 (41.4)
Mean daily minimum °C (°F)	−6.3 (20.7)	−6.9 (19.6)	−4.1 (24.6)	−0.9 (30.4)	3.4 (38.1)	7.1 (44.8)	8.7 (47.7)	9.0 (48.2)	5.5 (41.9)	2.7 (36.9)	−2.1 (28.2)	−5.1 (22.8)	0.9 (33.6)
Record low °C (°F)	−20.2 (−4.4)	−25.4 (−13.7)	−18.7 (−1.7)	−12.0 (10.4)	−7.5 (18.5)	−5.0 (23.0)	0.3 (32.5)	−1.0 (30.2)	−6.0 (21.2)	−10.9 (12.4)	−16.5 (2.3)	−20.2 (−4.4)	−25.4 (−13.7)
Average precipitation mm (inches)	130.8 (5.15)	110.9 (4.37)	113.4 (4.46)	103.3 (4.07)	151.0 (5.94)	129.7 (5.11)	133.9 (5.27)	135.6 (5.34)	120.6 (4.75)	122.1 (4.81)	121.0 (4.76)	150.8 (5.94)	1,523.1 (59.96)
Average precipitation days (≥ 1.0 mm)	10.5	9.7	10.2	10.0	14.2	11.9	11.3	11.2	10.3	10.7	10.9	11.5	132.5
Source: Météo-France
