= Cléry, Savoie =

Cléry
- Commune
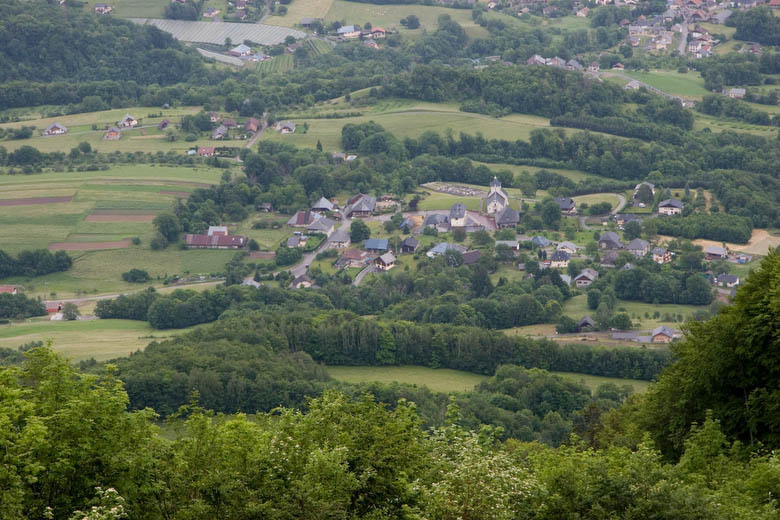
- A panoramic view of the village of Cléry
- Location of Cléry
- Location within France Location within Auvergne-Rhône-Alpes
- Coordinates: 45°38′42″N 6°17′37″E
- Country: France
- Region: Auvergne-Rhône-Alpes
- Department: Savoie
- Arrondissement: Albertville
- Canton: Albertville-2
- Intercommunality: CA Arlysère

Government
  - Mayor (2020–2026): Frédéric Palluel-Lafleur
- Area^{1}: 10.9 km^{2} (4.2 sq mi)
- Highest elevation: 1,851 m (6,073 ft)
- Lowest elevation: 400 m (1,300 ft)
- Population (2023): 367
  - Density: 33.7/km^{2} (87.2/sq mi)
- Time zone: UTC+01:00 (CET)
  - Summer (DST): UTC+02:00 (CEST)
- INSEE/Postal code: 73086 /73460
- Website: www.clery.fr
- ^{1} French Land Register data, which excludes lakes, ponds, glaciers > 1 km^{2} (0.386 sq mi or 247 acres) and river estuaries.

Cléry (French pronunciation: [kleʁi]; Arpitan: Klyèryé) is a commune in the Savoie department in the Auvergne-Rhône-Alpes region in south-eastern France.

== Geography ==
The Chéran forms the commune's western border.

== See also ==
- Communes of the Savoie department
