= Venthon =

- Commune
- Location of Venthon
- Location within France Location within Auvergne-Rhône-Alpes
- Coordinates: 45°41′19″N 6°24′51″E
- Country: France
- Region: Auvergne-Rhône-Alpes
- Department: Savoie
- Arrondissement: Albertville
- Canton: Ugine
- Intercommunality: CA Arlysère

Government
  - Mayor (2020–2026): Claude Revil-Baudard
- Area^{1}: 2.5 km^{2} (0.97 sq mi)
- Highest elevation: 1,382 m (4,534 ft)
- Lowest elevation: 352 m (1,155 ft)
- Population (2023): 606
  - Density: 240/km^{2} (630/sq mi)
- Time zone: UTC+01:00 (CET)
  - Summer (DST): UTC+02:00 (CEST)
- INSEE/Postal code: 73308 /73200
- ^{1} French Land Register data, which excludes lakes, ponds, glaciers > 1 km^{2} (0.386 sq mi or 247 acres) and river estuaries.

Venthon (French pronunciation: [vɑ̃tɔ̃]; Arpitan: Vinton) is a commune in the Savoie department in the Auvergne-Rhône-Alpes region in south-eastern France. It is part of the urban area of Albertville.

== See also ==
- Communes of the Savoie department
