= Thénésol =

- Commune
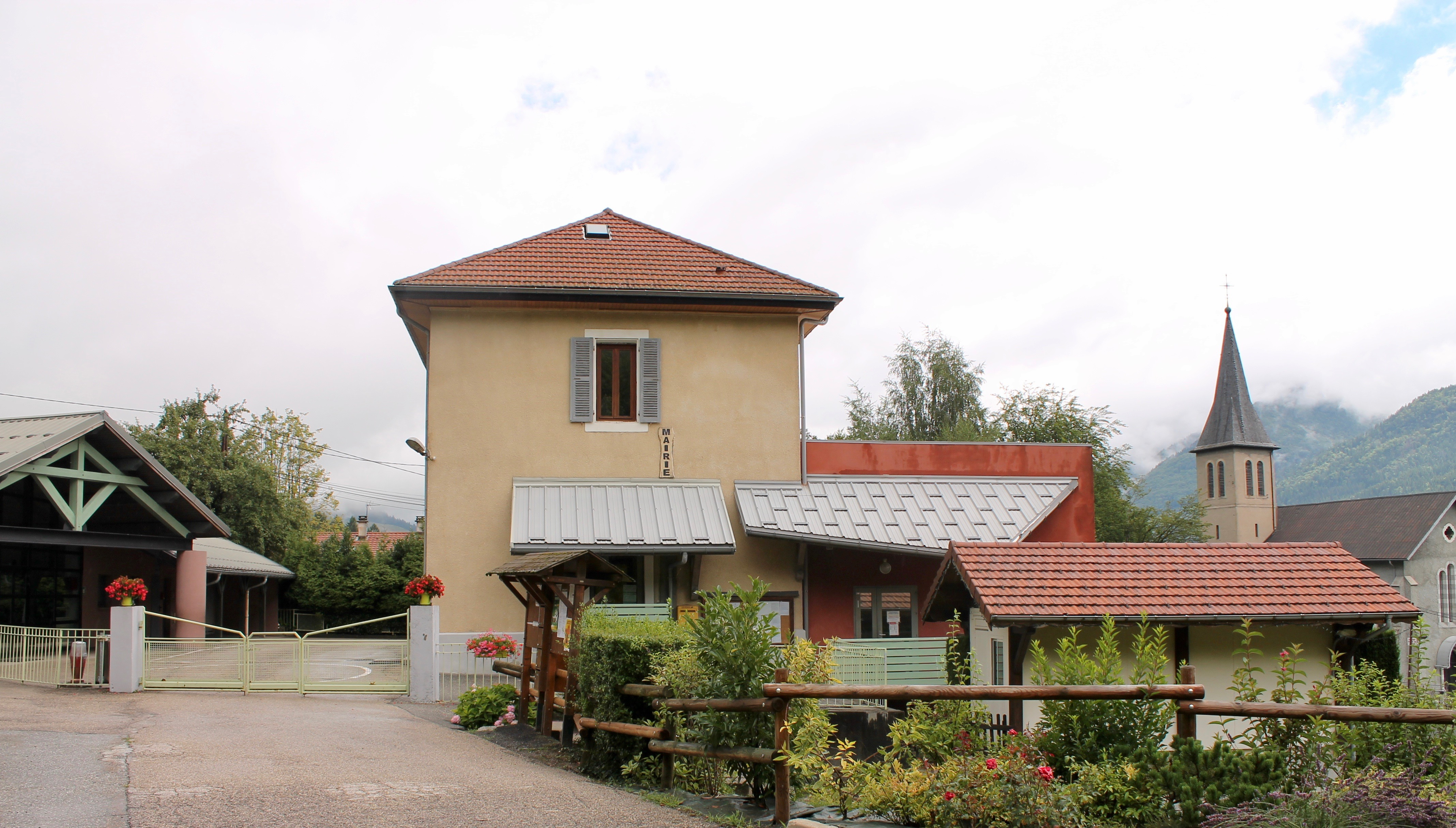
- Town hall
- Location of Thénésol
- Location within France Location within Auvergne-Rhône-Alpes
- Coordinates: 45°42′46″N 6°23′52″E
- Country: France
- Region: Auvergne-Rhône-Alpes
- Department: Savoie
- Arrondissement: Albertville
- Canton: Ugine
- Intercommunality: CA Arlysère

Government
  - Mayor (2021–2026): Frédéric Joguet
- Area^{1}: 5.49 km^{2} (2.12 sq mi)
- Highest elevation: 1,800 m (5,900 ft)
- Lowest elevation: 364 m (1,194 ft)
- Population (2023): 326
  - Density: 59.4/km^{2} (154/sq mi)
- Time zone: UTC+01:00 (CET)
  - Summer (DST): UTC+02:00 (CEST)
- INSEE/Postal code: 73292 /73200
- ^{1} French Land Register data, which excludes lakes, ponds, glaciers > 1 km^{2} (0.386 sq mi or 247 acres) and river estuaries.

Thénésol (French pronunciation: [tenezɔl]) is a commune in the Savoie department in the Auvergne-Rhône-Alpes region in south-eastern France.

== See also ==
- Communes of the Savoie department
