= Notre-Dame-de-Bellecombe =

- Commune
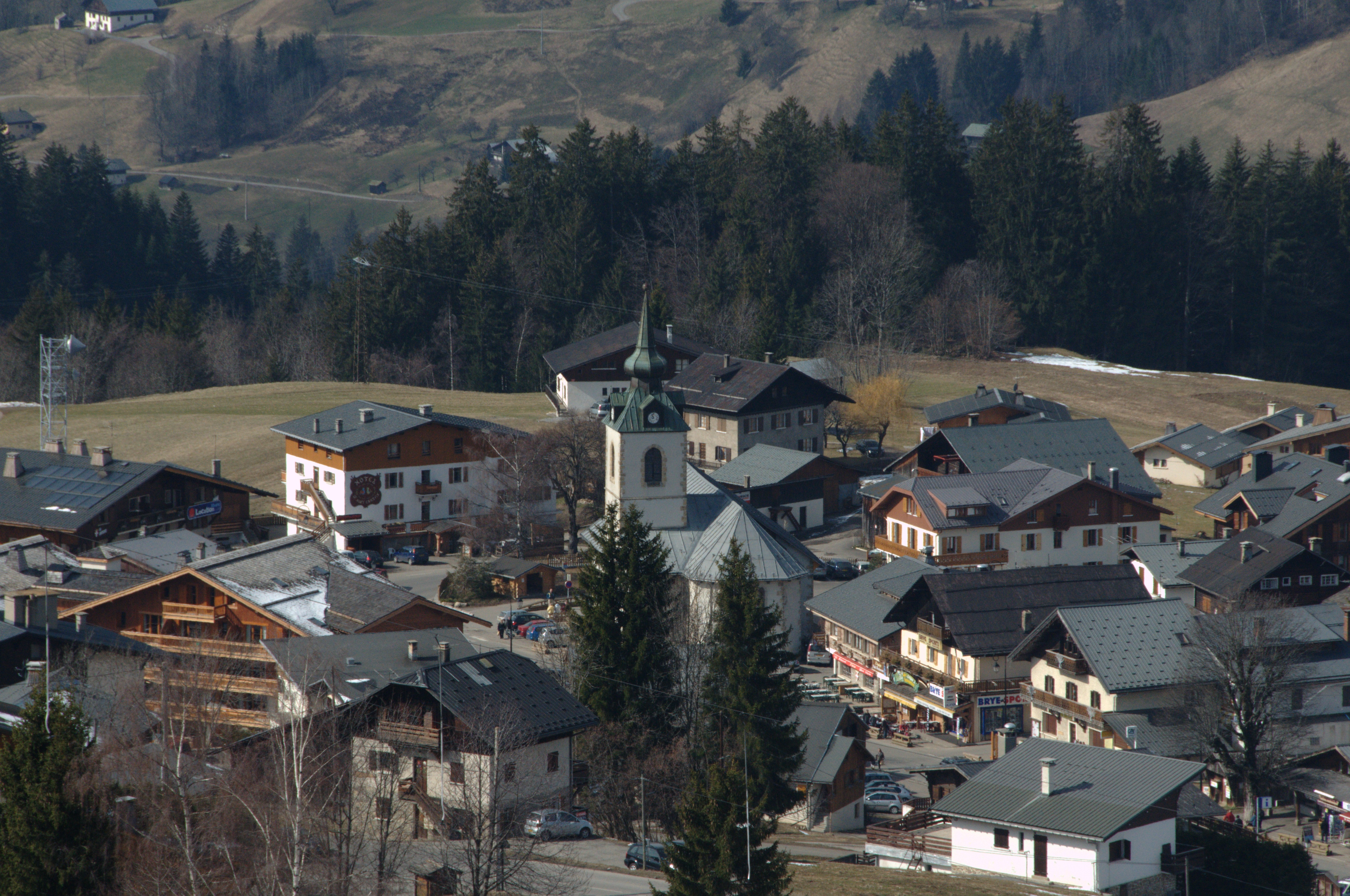
- Notre-Dame-de-Bellecombe seen from the ski slopes

- Coat of arms
- Location of Notre-Dame-de-Bellecombe
- Location within France Location within Auvergne-Rhône-Alpes
- Coordinates: 45°48′37″N 6°31′11″E
- Country: France
- Region: Auvergne-Rhône-Alpes
- Department: Savoie
- Arrondissement: Albertville
- Canton: Ugine
- Intercommunality: CA Arlysère

Government
  - Mayor (2020–2026): Philippe Mollier
- Area^{1}: 21.45 km^{2} (8.28 sq mi)
- Highest elevation: 2,069 m (6,788 ft)
- Lowest elevation: 839 m (2,753 ft)
- Population (2023): 463
  - Density: 21.6/km^{2} (55.9/sq mi)
- Time zone: UTC+01:00 (CET)
  - Summer (DST): UTC+02:00 (CEST)
- INSEE/Postal code: 73186 /73590
- ^{1} French Land Register data, which excludes lakes, ponds, glaciers > 1 km^{2} (0.386 sq mi or 247 acres) and river estuaries.

Notre-Dame-de-Bellecombe (French pronunciation: [nɔtʁ dam də bɛlkɔ̃b]; Arpitan: Bèlakonba) is a commune in the Savoie department in the Auvergne-Rhône-Alpes region in south-eastern France.

== See also ==
- Communes of the Savoie department
