= Saint-Nicolas-la-Chapelle, Savoie =

Saint-Nicolas-la-Chapelle
- Commune
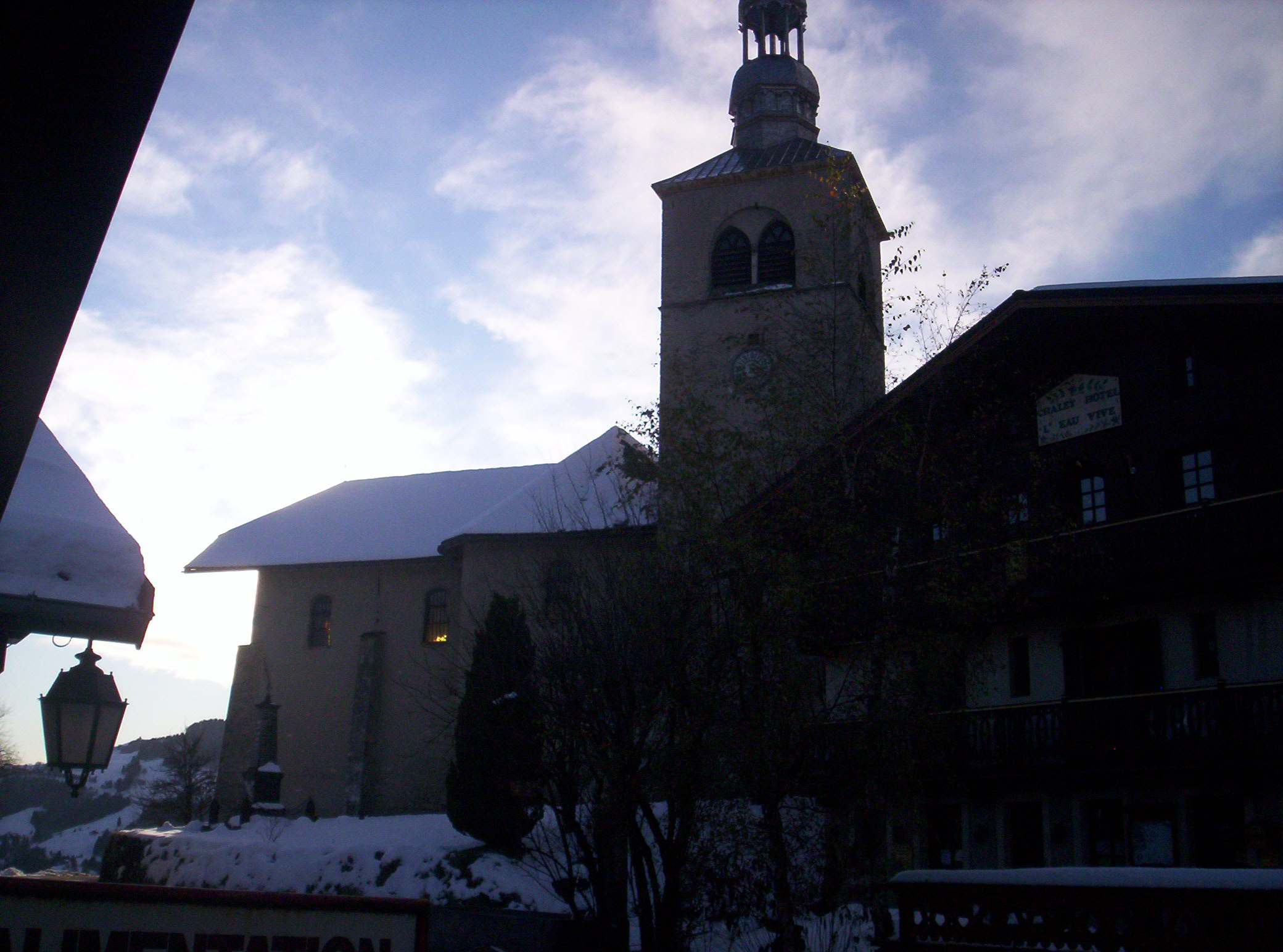
- The church in Saint-Nicolas-la-Chapelle
- Location of Saint-Nicolas-la-Chapelle
- Location within France Location within Auvergne-Rhône-Alpes
- Coordinates: 45°48′34″N 6°30′08″E
- Country: France
- Region: Auvergne-Rhône-Alpes
- Department: Savoie
- Arrondissement: Albertville
- Canton: Ugine
- Intercommunality: CA Arlysère

Government
  - Mayor (2020–2026): Ghislaine Joly
- Area^{1}: 23.63 km^{2} (9.12 sq mi)
- Highest elevation: 2,217 m (7,274 ft)
- Lowest elevation: 751 m (2,464 ft)
- Population (2023): 502
  - Density: 21.2/km^{2} (55.0/sq mi)
- Time zone: UTC+01:00 (CET)
  - Summer (DST): UTC+02:00 (CEST)
- INSEE/Postal code: 73262 /73590
- ^{1} French Land Register data, which excludes lakes, ponds, glaciers > 1 km^{2} (0.386 sq mi or 247 acres) and river estuaries.

Saint-Nicolas-la-Chapelle (French pronunciation: [sɛ̃ nikɔla la ʃapɛl]) is a commune in the Savoie department in the Auvergne-Rhône-Alpes region in south-eastern France.

== See also ==
- Communes of the Savoie department
