= Canton of Ugine =

Coordinates: 45.75°N 6.42°E

Ugine
- Canton
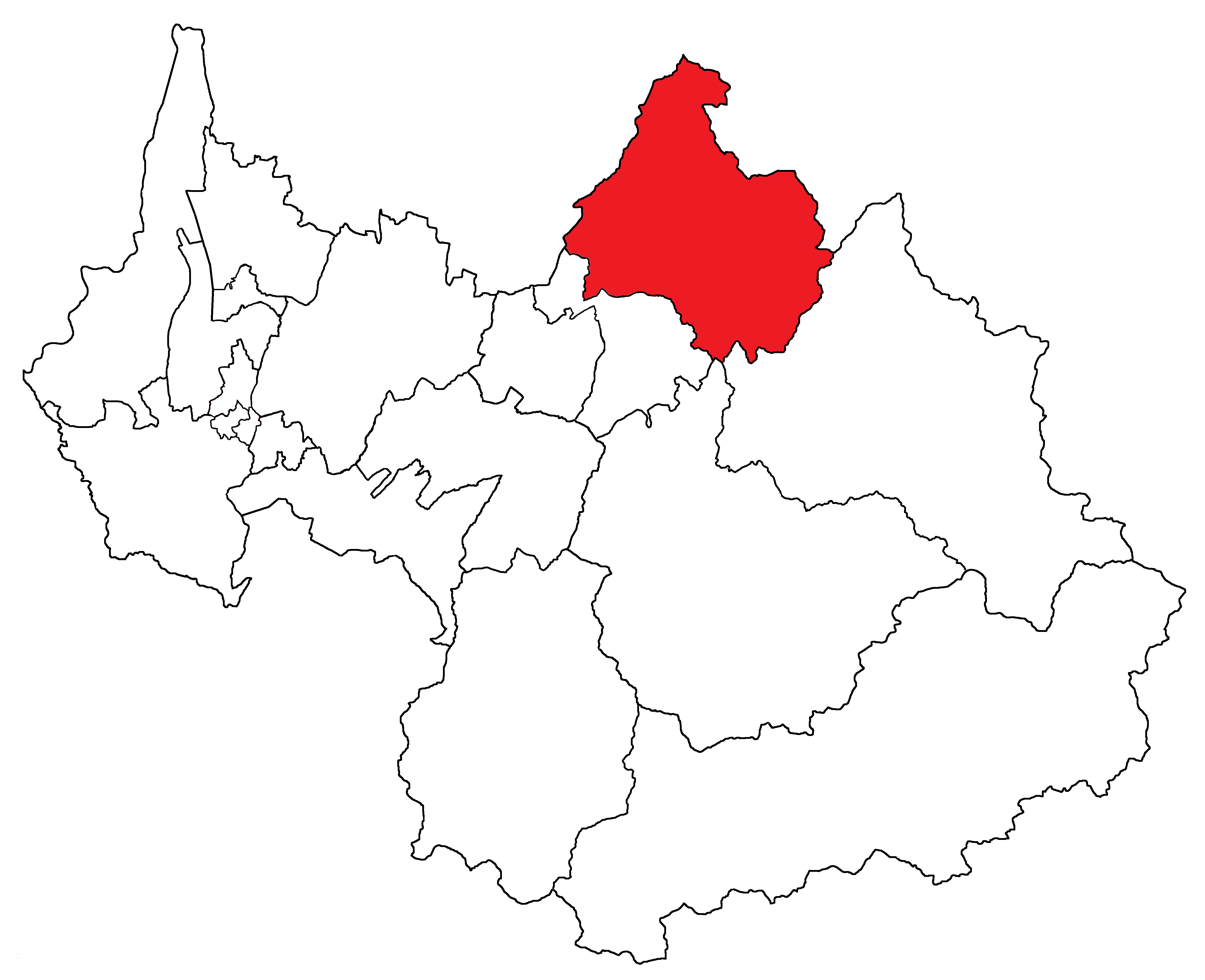
- Interactive map of Ugine
- Country: France
- Region: Auvergne-Rhône-Alpes
- Department: Savoie
- No. of communes: {{{nbcomm}}}

Government
  - Representatives (2021–2028): Annick Cressens; Franck Lombard
- Area: 476.14 km^{2} (183.84 sq mi)
- Population (2023): 17,614
  - Density: 36.993/km^{2} (95.812/sq mi)
- INSEE code: 73 19

The canton of Ugine is an administrative division of the Savoie department, southeastern France. Its borders were modified at the French canton reorganisation which came into effect in March 2015. Its seat is in Ugine.

== Composition ==
It consists of the following communes:

1. Beaufort
2. Césarches
3. Cohennoz
4. Crest-Voland
5. Flumet
6. La Giettaz
7. Hauteluce
8. Marthod
9. Notre-Dame-de-Bellecombe
10. Pallud
11. Queige
12. Saint-Nicolas-la-Chapelle
13. Thénésol
14. Ugine
15. Venthon
16. Villard-sur-Doron

== Councillors ==
Election	Councillors	Party	Occupation
2015	Annick Cressens	MoDem	Mayor of Beaufort
2015	Franck Lombard	DVD	Mayor of Ugine

== Pictures of the canton ==
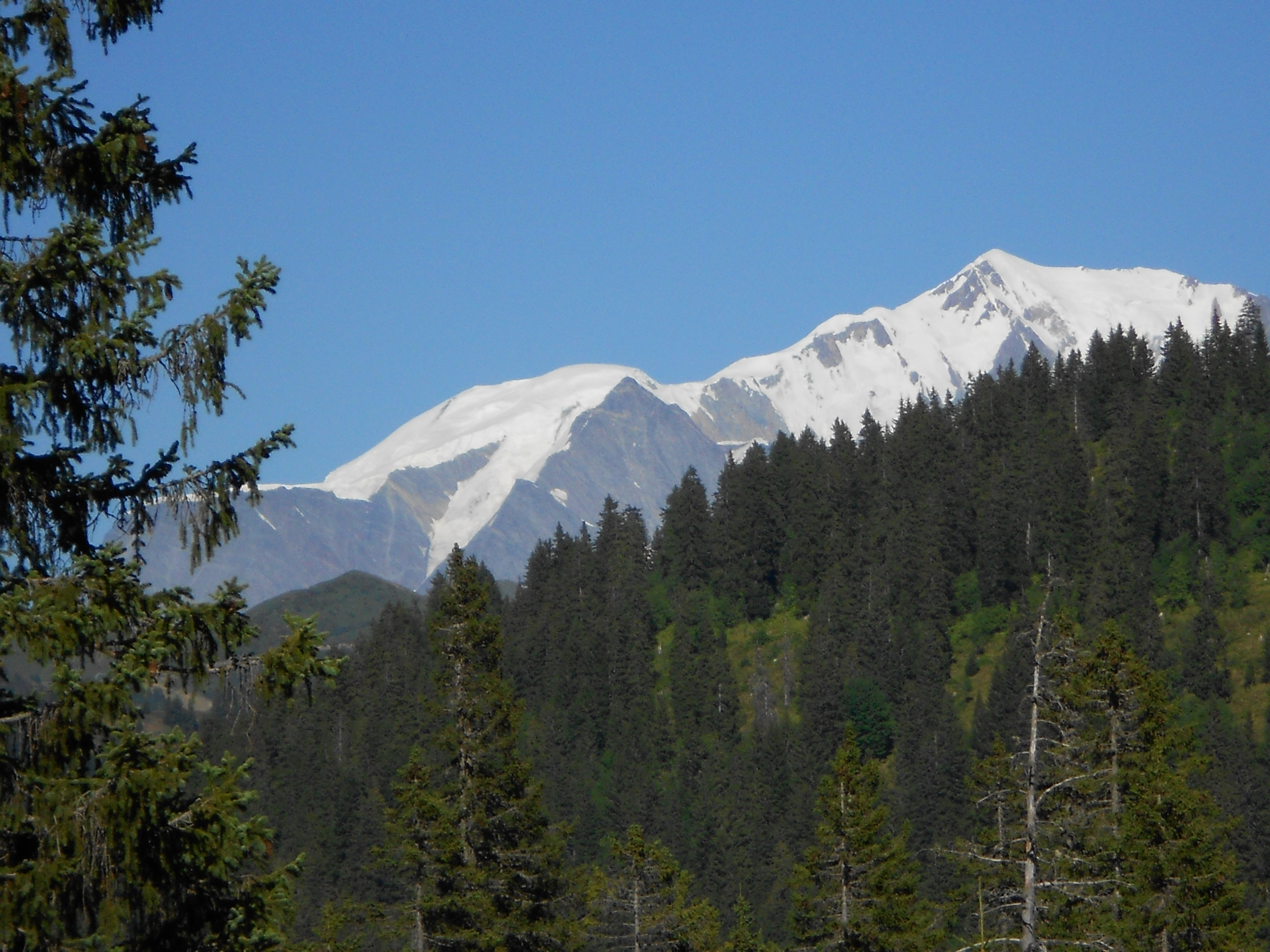
Mont Blanc massif

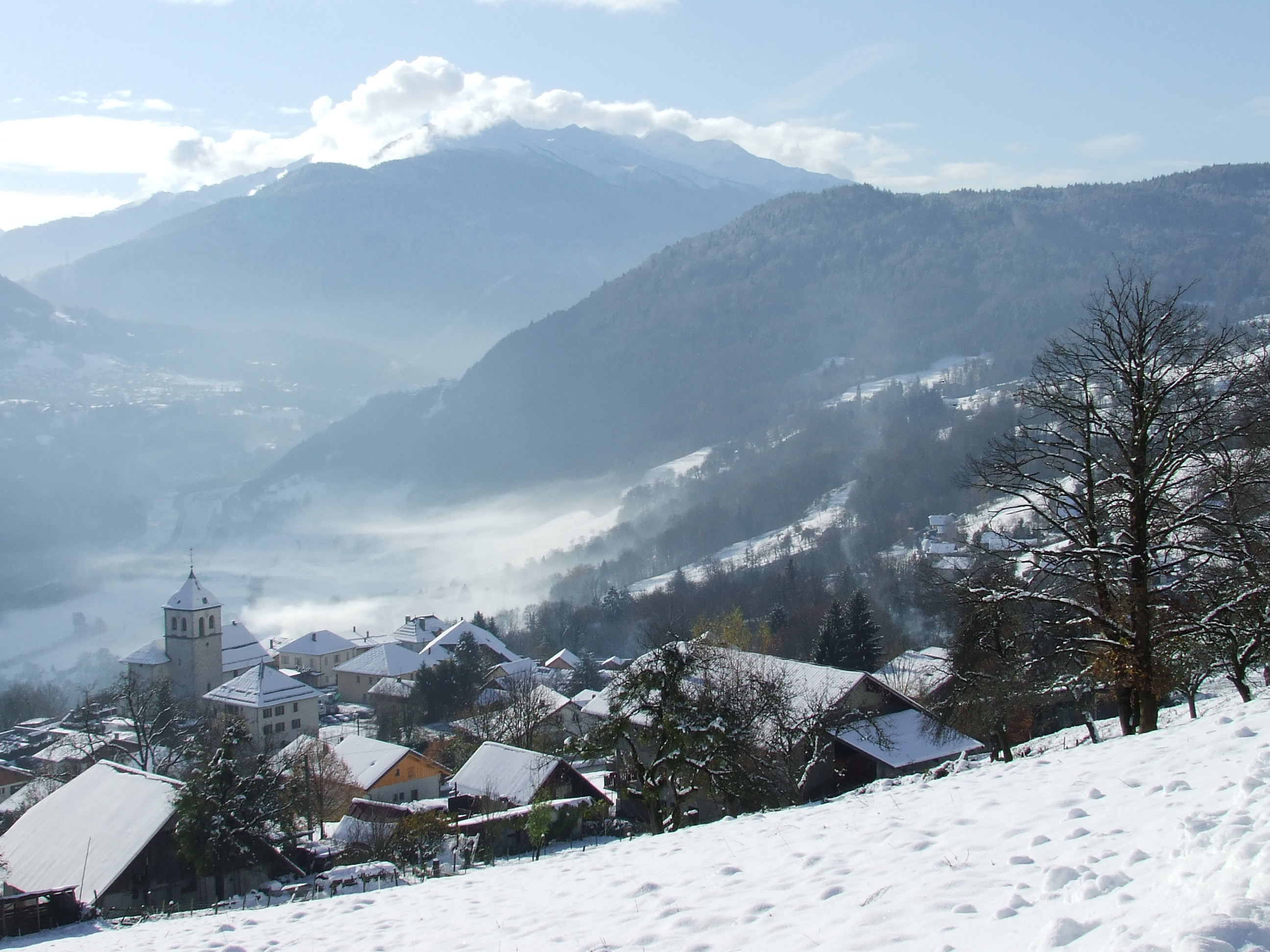
View of Marthod

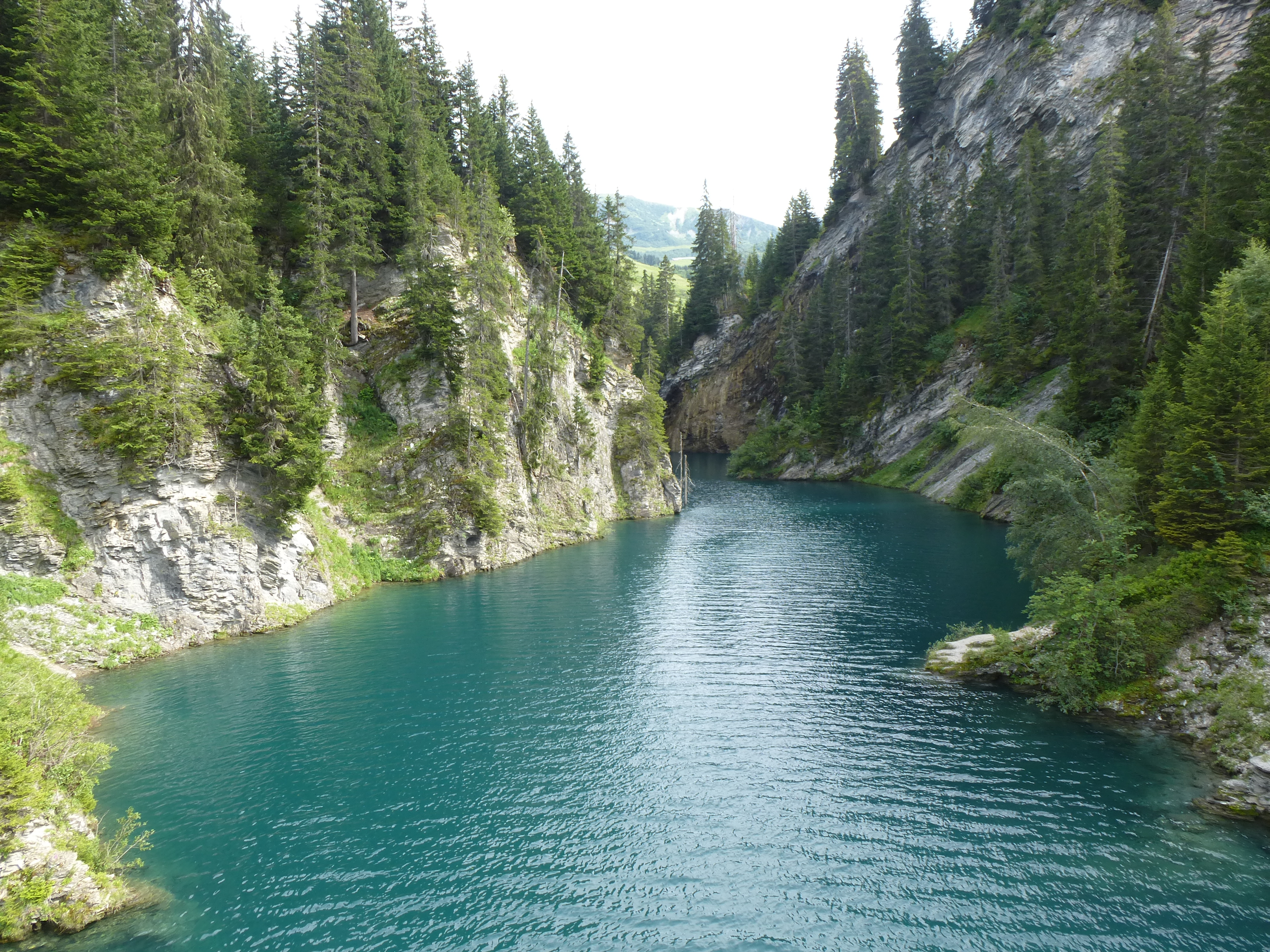
The "Lac de St Guerin" in Beaufort
