= Hauteluce =

Hauteluce Hôtaluce (Arpitan)
- Commune
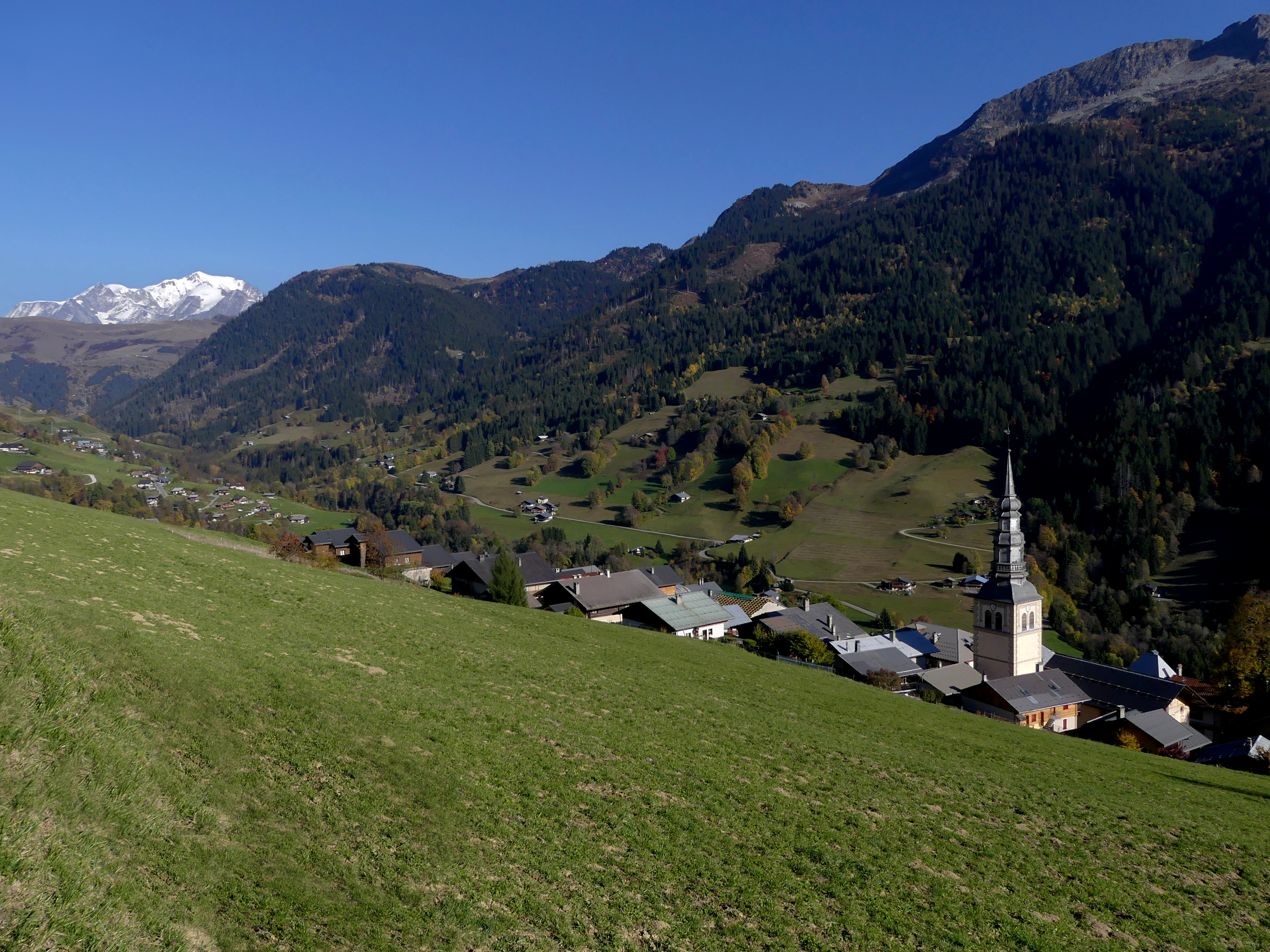
- A general view of Hauteluce

- Coat of arms
- Location of Hauteluce
- Location within France Location within Auvergne-Rhône-Alpes
- Coordinates: 45°45′07″N 6°35′11″E
- Country: France
- Region: Auvergne-Rhône-Alpes
- Department: Savoie
- Arrondissement: Albertville
- Canton: Ugine
- Intercommunality: CA Arlysère

Government
  - Mayor (2020–2026): Xavier Desmarets
- Area^{1}: 62.39 km^{2} (24.09 sq mi)
- Highest elevation: 2,555 m (8,383 ft)
- Lowest elevation: 780 m (2,560 ft)
- Population (2023): 734
  - Density: 11.8/km^{2} (30.5/sq mi)
- Time zone: UTC+01:00 (CET)
  - Summer (DST): UTC+02:00 (CEST)
- INSEE/Postal code: 73132 /73620
- Website: www.mairie-hauteluce.fr
- ^{1} French Land Register data, which excludes lakes, ponds, glaciers > 1 km^{2} (0.386 sq mi or 247 acres) and river estuaries.

Hauteluce (French pronunciation: [otlys]; Arpitan: Hôtaluce) is an alpine commune in the Savoie department in the Auvergne-Rhône-Alpes region in Southeastern France. It is located in Beaufortain, on the departmental border with Haute-Savoie. As of 2023, the population of the commune was 734.

== Geography ==
=== Climate ===
Hauteluce has a humid continental climate (Köppen climate classification Dfb). The average annual temperature in Hauteluce is 6.9 °C (44.4 °F). The average annual rainfall is 1,688.1 mm (66.46 in) with December as the wettest month. The temperatures are highest on average in July, at around 16.0 °C (60.8 °F), and lowest in January, at around −2.0 °C (28.4 °F). The highest temperature ever recorded in Hauteluce was 37.4 °C (99.3 °F) on 26 June 2019; the coldest temperature ever recorded was −24.0 °C (−11.2 °F) on 9 January 1985.

Climate data for Hauteluce, 1215m (1991−2020 normals, extremes 1967−2021)
| Month | Jan | Feb | Mar | Apr | May | Jun | Jul | Aug | Sep | Oct | Nov | Dec | Year |
|---|---|---|---|---|---|---|---|---|---|---|---|---|---|
| Record high °C (°F) | 12.0 (53.6) | 14.0 (57.2) | 18.0 (64.4) | 24.2 (75.6) | 28.2 (82.8) | 37.4 (99.3) | 33.0 (91.4) | 33.0 (91.4) | 27.0 (80.6) | 22.7 (72.9) | 18.1 (64.6) | 17.9 (64.2) | 37.4 (99.3) |
| Mean daily maximum °C (°F) | 0.9 (33.6) | 2.5 (36.5) | 7.3 (45.1) | 11.2 (52.2) | 15.7 (60.3) | 19.8 (67.6) | 22.0 (71.6) | 21.6 (70.9) | 16.9 (62.4) | 11.8 (53.2) | 5.2 (41.4) | 1.5 (34.7) | 11.4 (52.5) |
| Daily mean °C (°F) | −2.0 (28.4) | −1.2 (29.8) | 2.7 (36.9) | 6.1 (43.0) | 10.2 (50.4) | 14.0 (57.2) | 16.0 (60.8) | 15.8 (60.4) | 11.9 (53.4) | 7.7 (45.9) | 2.2 (36.0) | −1.1 (30.0) | 6.9 (44.4) |
| Mean daily minimum °C (°F) | −4.9 (23.2) | −5.0 (23.0) | −1.9 (28.6) | 1.0 (33.8) | 4.8 (40.6) | 8.3 (46.9) | 10.1 (50.2) | 10.0 (50.0) | 6.9 (44.4) | 3.7 (38.7) | −0.9 (30.4) | −3.7 (25.3) | 2.4 (36.3) |
| Record low °C (°F) | −24.0 (−11.2) | −21.0 (−5.8) | −22.0 (−7.6) | −12.0 (10.4) | −7.0 (19.4) | −2.0 (28.4) | 1.0 (33.8) | −0.3 (31.5) | −2.5 (27.5) | −8.7 (16.3) | −14.0 (6.8) | −18.0 (−0.4) | −24.0 (−11.2) |
| Average precipitation mm (inches) | 154.5 (6.08) | 125.8 (4.95) | 131.4 (5.17) | 110.9 (4.37) | 145.9 (5.74) | 150.6 (5.93) | 151.6 (5.97) | 140.6 (5.54) | 126.9 (5.00) | 134.2 (5.28) | 137.8 (5.43) | 177.9 (7.00) | 1,688.1 (66.46) |
| Average precipitation days (≥ 1.0 mm) | 11.0 | 10.4 | 10.7 | 10.5 | 14.3 | 13.5 | 12.2 | 11.7 | 10.6 | 11.4 | 11.3 | 12.1 | 139.8 |
Source: Météo-France

== See also ==
- Communes of the Savoie department
