= Marthod =

- Commune
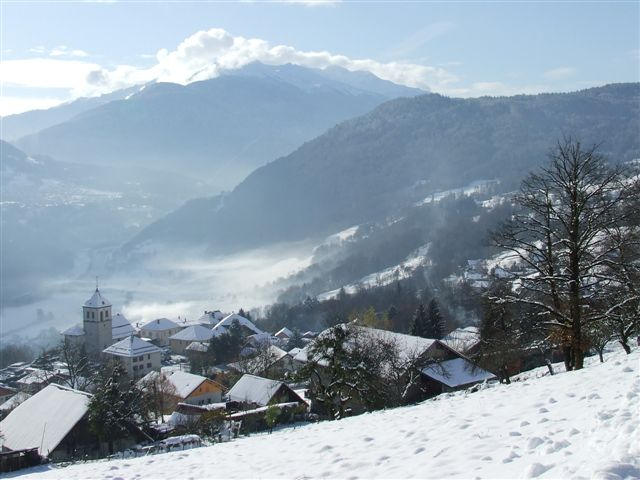
- Marthod during the winter
- Location of Marthod
- Location within France Location within Auvergne-Rhône-Alpes
- Coordinates: 45°43′36″N 6°24′16″E
- Country: France
- Region: Auvergne-Rhône-Alpes
- Department: Savoie
- Arrondissement: Albertville
- Canton: Ugine
- Intercommunality: CA Arlysère

Government
  - Mayor (2023–2026): Virginie Vernaz
- Area^{1}: 14.78 km^{2} (5.71 sq mi)
- Highest elevation: 520 m (1,710 ft)
- Lowest elevation: 372 m (1,220 ft)
- Population (2023): 1,346
  - Density: 91.07/km^{2} (235.9/sq mi)
- Time zone: UTC+01:00 (CET)
  - Summer (DST): UTC+02:00 (CEST)
- INSEE/Postal code: 73153 /73400
- ^{1} French Land Register data, which excludes lakes, ponds, glaciers > 1 km^{2} (0.386 sq mi or 247 acres) and river estuaries.

Marthod (French pronunciation: [maʁto]; Arpitan: Martou) is a commune in the Savoie department in the Auvergne-Rhône-Alpes region in south-eastern France.

== See also ==
- Communes of the Savoie department
