= Cohennoz =

Cohennoz Le Kouéno (Arpitan)
- Commune
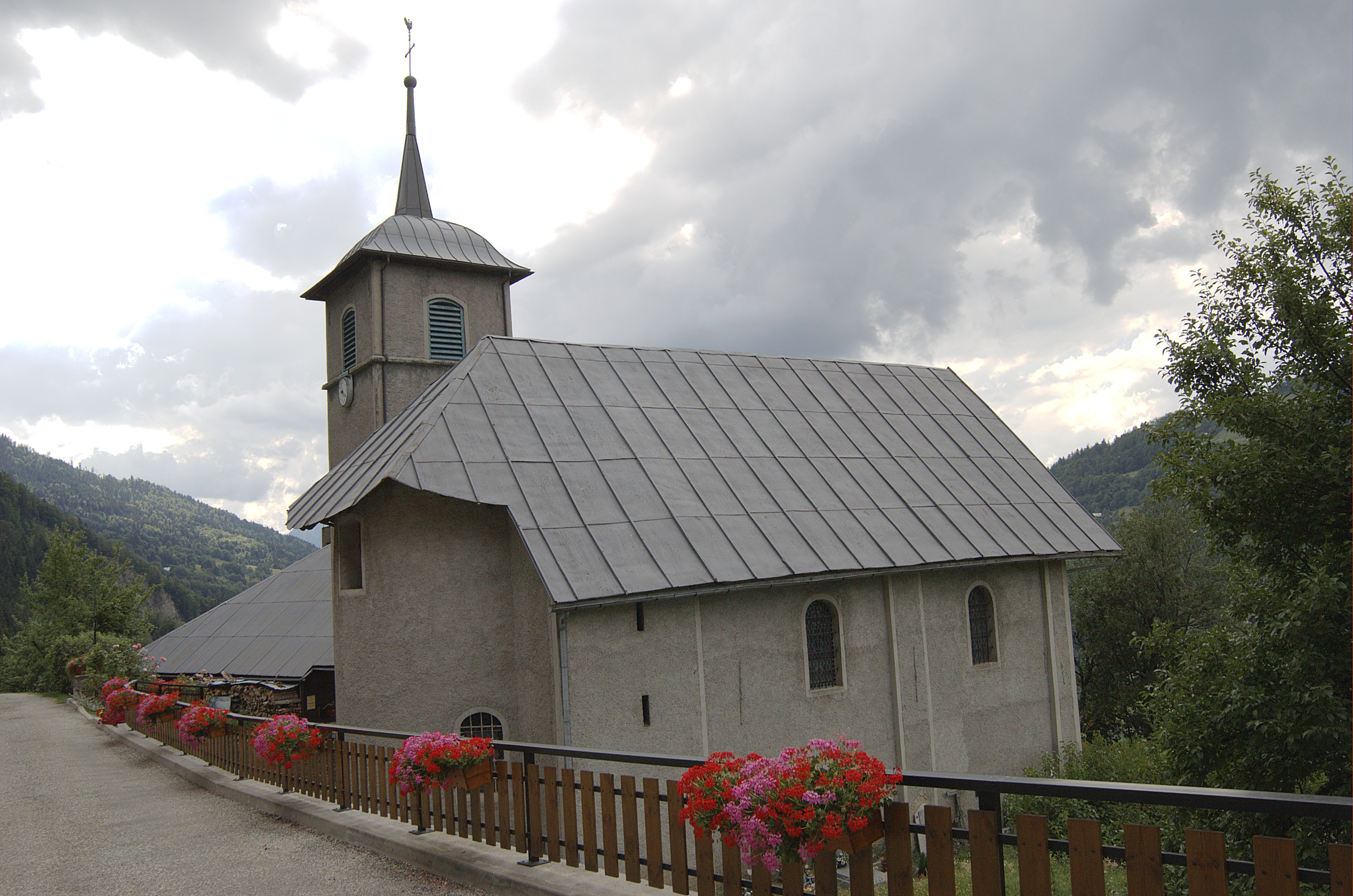
- The church in Cohennoz
- Location of Cohennoz
- Location within France Location within Auvergne-Rhône-Alpes
- Coordinates: 45°45′30″N 6°28′55″E
- Country: France
- Region: Auvergne-Rhône-Alpes
- Department: Savoie
- Arrondissement: Albertville
- Canton: Ugine
- Intercommunality: CA Arlysère

Government
  - Mayor (2023–2026): Christian Excoffon
- Area^{1}: 13.78 km^{2} (5.32 sq mi)
- Highest elevation: 1,880 m (6,170 ft)
- Lowest elevation: 520 m (1,710 ft)
- Population (2023): 137
  - Density: 9.94/km^{2} (25.7/sq mi)
- Time zone: UTC+01:00 (CET)
  - Summer (DST): UTC+02:00 (CEST)
- INSEE/Postal code: 73088 /73400
- Website: www.mairie-cohennoz.fr
- ^{1} French Land Register data, which excludes lakes, ponds, glaciers > 1 km^{2} (0.386 sq mi or 247 acres) and river estuaries.

Cohennoz (French pronunciation: [kɔ.ɛno]; Arpitan: Le Kouéno) is a commune in the Savoie department in the Auvergne-Rhône-Alpes region in south-eastern France.

== Geography ==
The Arly forms the commune's western border.

== Toponymy ==
As with many polysyllabic Arpitan toponyms or anthroponyms, the final -x marks oxytonic stress (on the last syllable), whereas the final -z indicates paroxytonic stress (on the penultimate syllable) and should not be pronounced, although in French it is often mispronounced due to hypercorrection.

== See also ==
- Communes of the Savoie department
