= Pallud =

- Commune
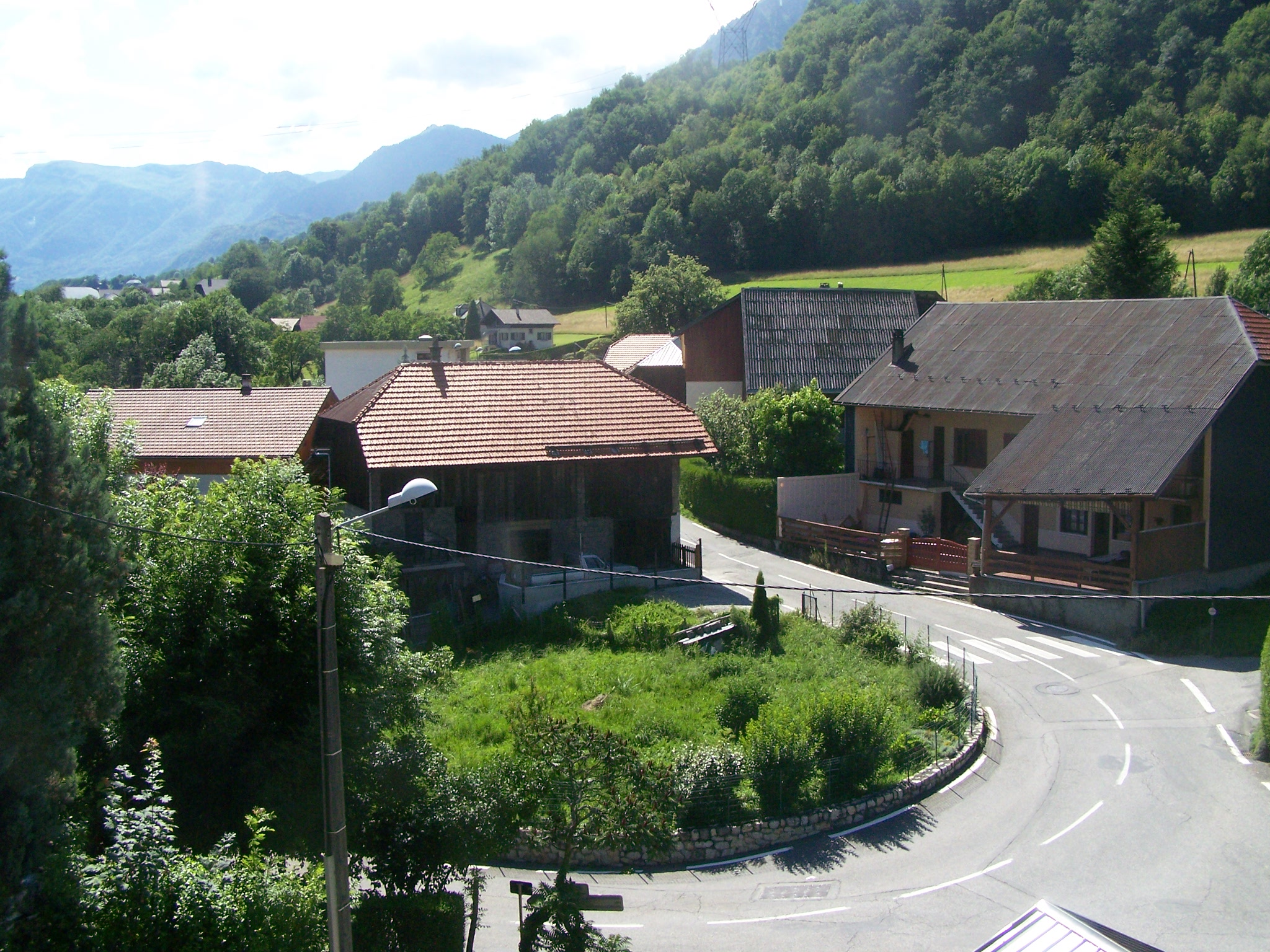
- A view from the church

- Coat of arms
- Location of Pallud
- Location within France Location within Auvergne-Rhône-Alpes
- Coordinates: 45°41′14″N 6°23′43″E
- Country: France
- Region: Auvergne-Rhône-Alpes
- Department: Savoie
- Arrondissement: Albertville
- Canton: Ugine
- Intercommunality: CA Arlysère

Government
  - Mayor (2020–2026): James Dunand-Sauthier
- Area^{1}: 5.2 km^{2} (2.0 sq mi)
- Highest elevation: 845 m (2,772 ft)
- Lowest elevation: 348 m (1,142 ft)
- Population (2023): 784
  - Density: 150/km^{2} (390/sq mi)
- Time zone: UTC+01:00 (CET)
  - Summer (DST): UTC+02:00 (CEST)
- INSEE/Postal code: 73196 /73200
- ^{1} French Land Register data, which excludes lakes, ponds, glaciers > 1 km^{2} (0.386 sq mi or 247 acres) and river estuaries.

Pallud (French pronunciation: [paly]; Arpitan: Paleu) is a commune in the Savoie department in the Auvergne-Rhône-Alpes region in south-eastern France. It is part of the urban area of Albertville.

== See also ==
- Communes of the Savoie department
