= Allondaz =

Allondaz Alonda (Arpitan)
- Commune
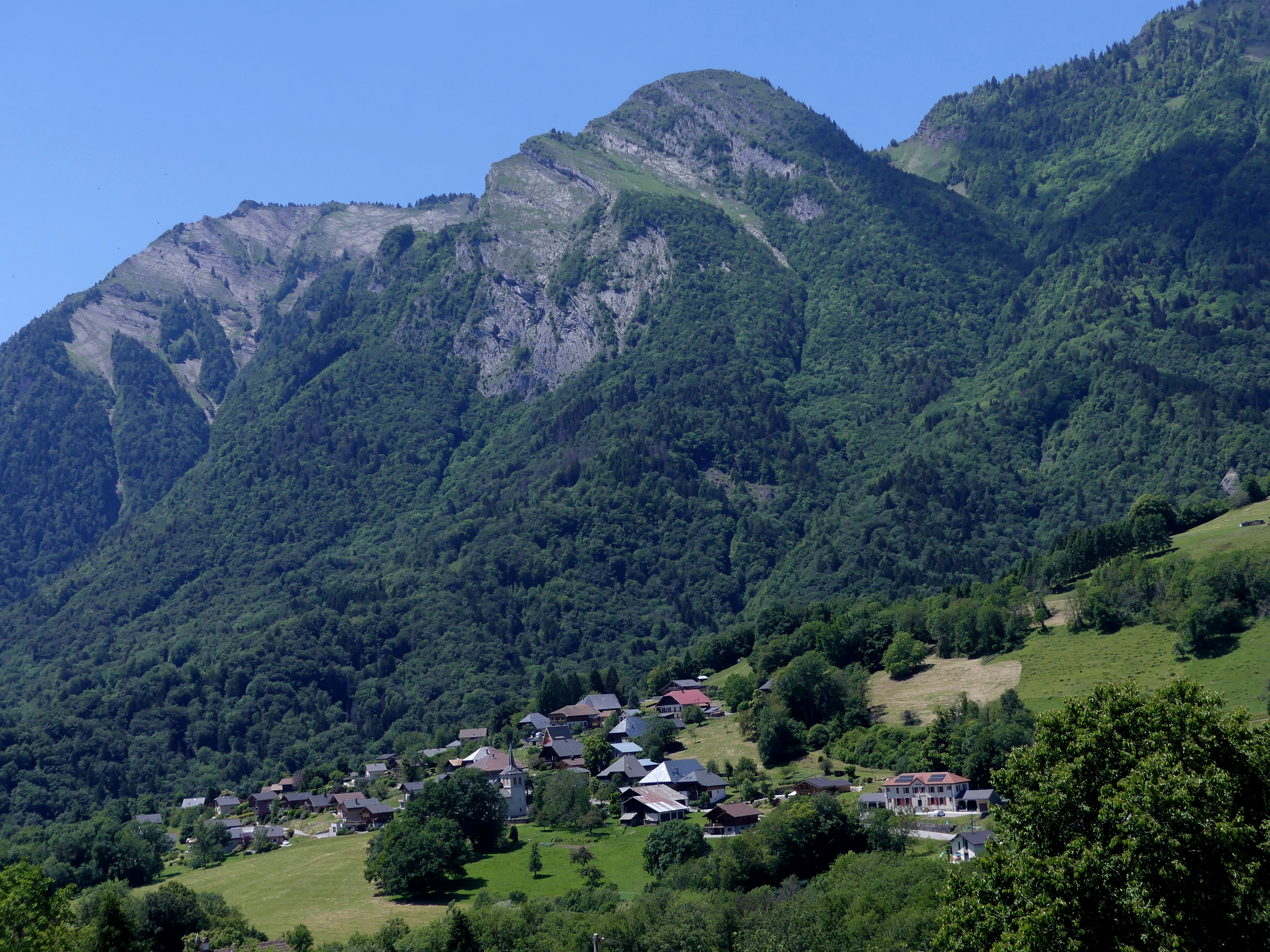
- Town seat
- Location of Allondaz
- Location within France Location within Auvergne-Rhône-Alpes
- Coordinates: 45°42′24″N 6°22′19″E
- Country: France
- Region: Auvergne-Rhône-Alpes
- Department: Savoie
- Arrondissement: Albertville
- Canton: Albertville-1
- Intercommunality: CA Arlysère

Government
  - Mayor (2020–2026): Frédérique Duc
- Area^{1}: 4.08 km^{2} (1.58 sq mi)
- Highest elevation: 1,616 m (5,302 ft)
- Lowest elevation: 557 m (1,827 ft)
- Population (2023): 298
  - Density: 73.0/km^{2} (189/sq mi)
- Demonym: Allondains
- Time zone: UTC+01:00 (CET)
  - Summer (DST): UTC+02:00 (CEST)
- INSEE/Postal code: 73014 /73200
- ^{1} French Land Register data, which excludes lakes, ponds, glaciers > 1 km^{2} (0.386 sq mi or 247 acres) and river estuaries.

Allondaz (Arpitan: Alonda) is a commune in the Savoie department in the Auvergne-Rhône-Alpes region in south-eastern France. It lies 4 km northwest of Albertville.

== See also ==
- Communes of the Savoie department
