= Ugine =

Ugine Ugena (Savoyard) Ugina (Italian)
- Commune
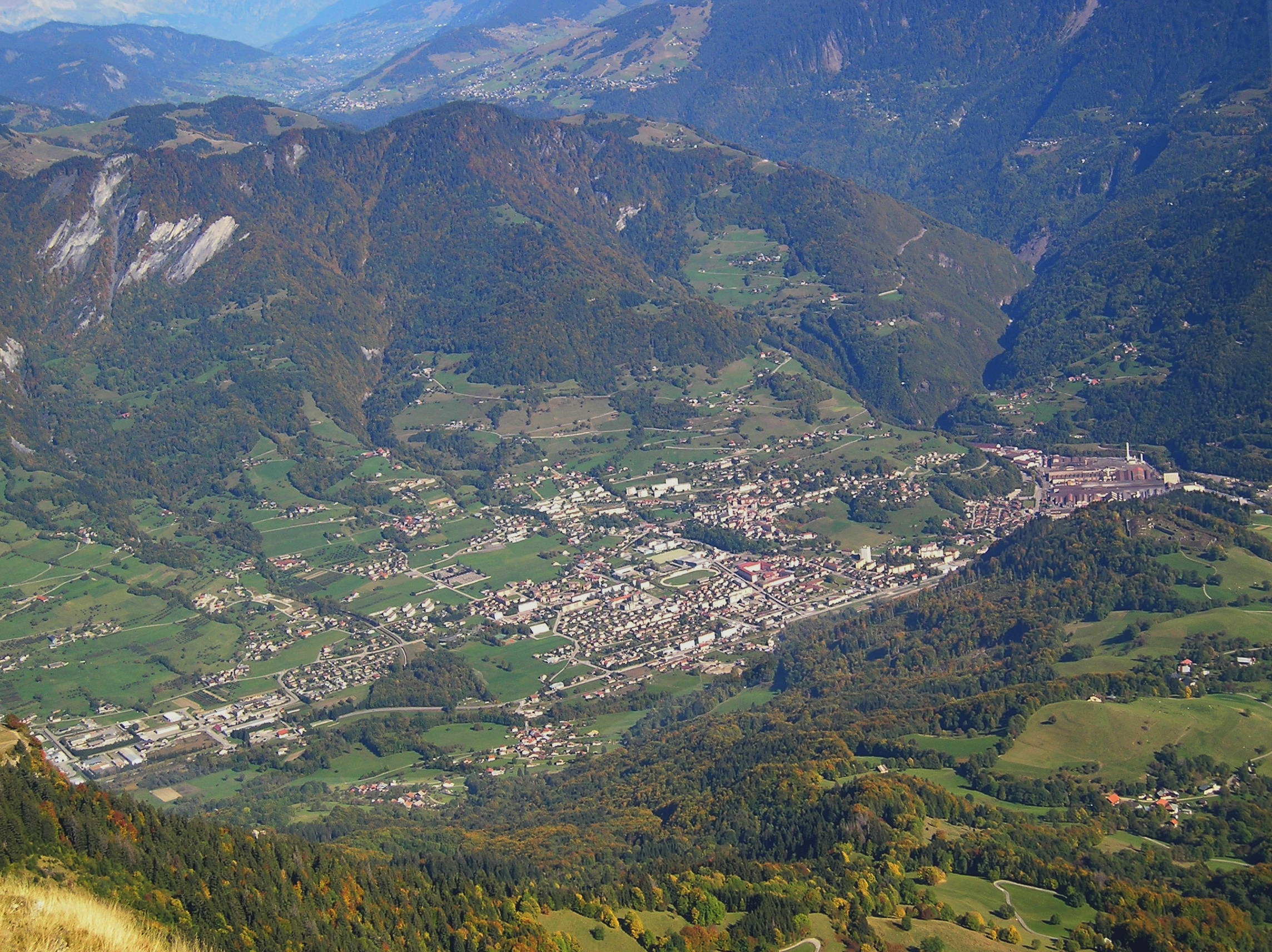
- A general view of Ugine

- Coat of arms
- Location of Ugine
- Location within France Location within Auvergne-Rhône-Alpes
- Coordinates: 45°45′12″N 6°25′14″E
- Country: France
- Region: Auvergne-Rhône-Alpes
- Department: Savoie
- Arrondissement: Albertville
- Canton: Ugine
- Intercommunality: CA Arlysère

Government
  - Mayor (2020–2026): Franck Lombard
- Area^{1}: 57.36 km^{2} (22.15 sq mi)
- Highest elevation: 2,407 m (7,897 ft)
- Lowest elevation: 391 m (1,283 ft)
- Population (2023): 7,154
  - Density: 124.7/km^{2} (323.0/sq mi)
- Time zone: UTC+01:00 (CET)
  - Summer (DST): UTC+02:00 (CEST)
- INSEE/Postal code: 73303 /73400
- Website: www.ugine.com
- ^{1} French Land Register data, which excludes lakes, ponds, glaciers > 1 km^{2} (0.386 sq mi or 247 acres) and river estuaries.

Ugine (French pronunciation: [yʒin]; Savoyard: Ugena; Italian: Ugina) is a commune in the Savoie department in the Auvergne-Rhône-Alpes region in south-eastern France.

== Geography ==
Steel bridge over the Gorge de l'Arly

=== Climate ===
Ugine has an oceanic climate (Köppen climate classification Cfb). The average annual temperature in Ugine is 11.6 °C (52.9 °F). The average annual rainfall is 1,398.7 mm (55.07 in) with December as the wettest month. The temperatures are highest on average in July, at around 20.7 °C (69.3 °F), and lowest in January, at around 2.4 °C (36.3 °F). The highest temperature ever recorded in Ugine was 40.4 °C (104.7 °F) on 13 August 2003; the coldest temperature ever recorded was −16.6 °C (2.1 °F) on 5 February 2012.

Climate data for Ugine (1991−2020 normals, extremes 1997−present)
Month	Jan	Feb	Mar	Apr	May	Jun	Jul	Aug	Sep	Oct	Nov	Dec	Year
Record high °C (°F)	19.7 (67.5)	21.9 (71.4)	25.4 (77.7)	28.3 (82.9)	32.3 (90.1)	36.0 (96.8)	38.7 (101.7)	40.4 (104.7)	31.3 (88.3)	28.0 (82.4)	22.9 (73.2)	19.8 (67.6)	40.4 (104.7)
Mean daily maximum °C (°F)	5.6 (42.1)	7.7 (45.9)	12.6 (54.7)	16.7 (62.1)	20.3 (68.5)	24.5 (76.1)	26.4 (79.5)	26.0 (78.8)	21.8 (71.2)	16.8 (62.2)	10.2 (50.4)	6.1 (43.0)	16.2 (61.2)
Daily mean °C (°F)	2.4 (36.3)	3.7 (38.7)	7.7 (45.9)	11.3 (52.3)	15.0 (59.0)	18.9 (66.0)	20.7 (69.3)	20.4 (68.7)	16.7 (62.1)	12.4 (54.3)	6.6 (43.9)	3.0 (37.4)	11.6 (52.9)
Mean daily minimum °C (°F)	−0.8 (30.6)	−0.3 (31.5)	2.9 (37.2)	6.0 (42.8)	9.6 (49.3)	13.3 (55.9)	14.9 (58.8)	14.8 (58.6)	11.5 (52.7)	8.0 (46.4)	3.1 (37.6)	−0.1 (31.8)	6.9 (44.4)
Record low °C (°F)	−11.6 (11.1)	−16.6 (2.1)	−10.7 (12.7)	−3.0 (26.6)	−0.7 (30.7)	2.7 (36.9)	6.6 (43.9)	5.9 (42.6)	2.0 (35.6)	−2.6 (27.3)	−7.4 (18.7)	−13.0 (8.6)	−16.6 (2.1)
Average precipitation mm (inches)	143.0 (5.63)	109.1 (4.30)	122.0 (4.80)	102.1 (4.02)	115.8 (4.56)	109.1 (4.30)	111.3 (4.38)	114.8 (4.52)	92.6 (3.65)	106.0 (4.17)	118.8 (4.68)	154.1 (6.07)	1,398.7 (55.07)
Average precipitation days (≥ 1.0 mm)	10.8	9.1	10.6	9.6	12.3	10.6	9.5	9.6	8.6	10.0	10.6	11.5	122.8
Source: Météo-France

== Population ==
Historical population
Year	Pop.	±% p.a.
1968	8,055	—
1975	8,020	−0.06%
1982	7,445	−1.06%
1990	7,248	−0.33%
1999	6,963	−0.44%
2007	7,037	+0.13%
2012	7,043	+0.02%
2017	7,039	−0.01%
2023	7,154	+0.27%
Source: INSEE

== See also ==
- Communes of the Savoie department
