= Brides-les-Bains =

- Commune
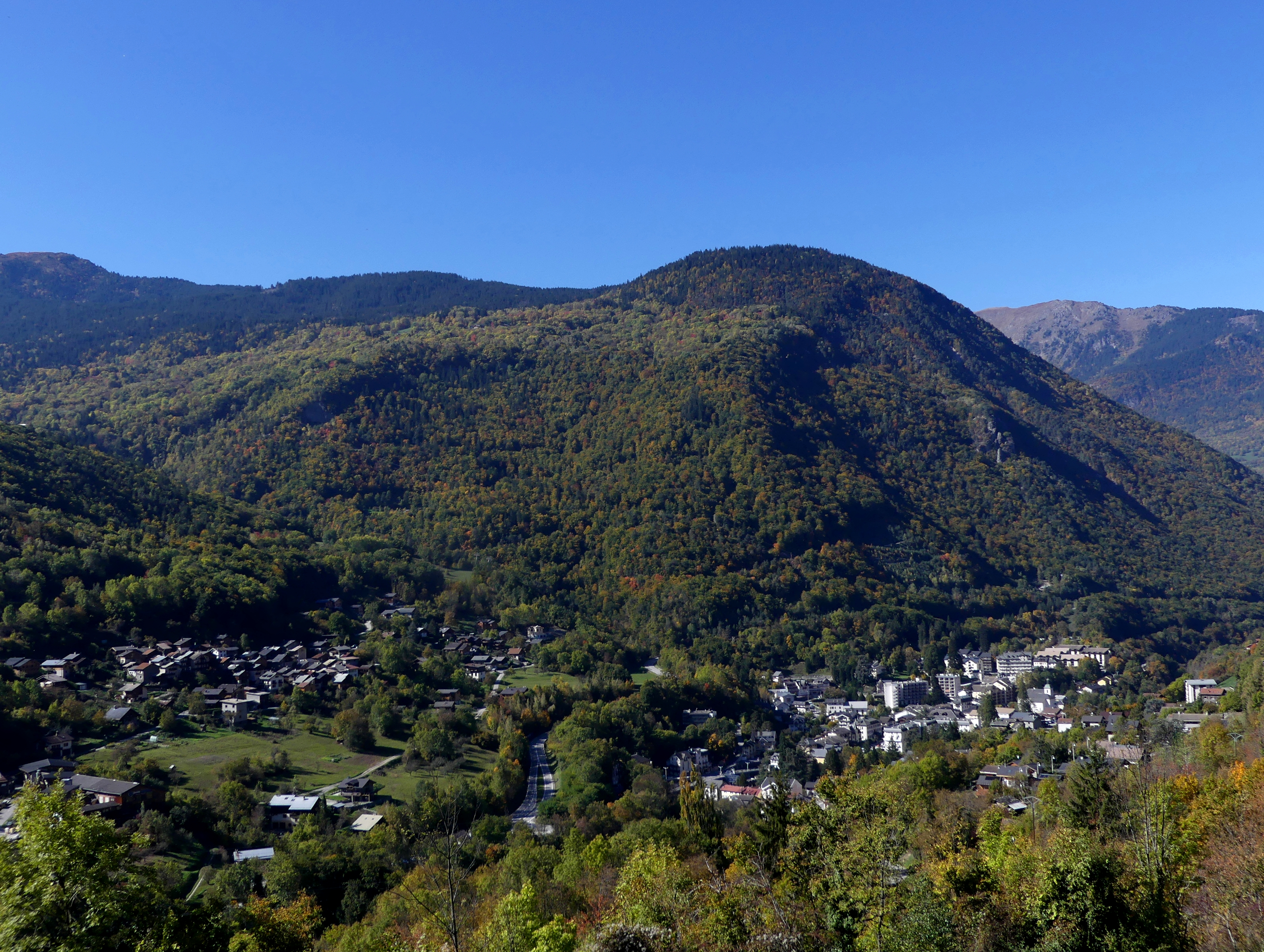

- Coat of arms
- Location of Brides-les-Bains
- Location within France Location within Auvergne-Rhône-Alpes
- Coordinates: 45°27′12″N 6°34′03″E
- Country: France
- Region: Auvergne-Rhône-Alpes
- Department: Savoie
- Arrondissement: Albertville
- Canton: Moûtiers

Government
  - Mayor (2020–2026): Bruno Pideil
- Area^{1}: 2.63 km^{2} (1.02 sq mi)
- Elevation: 580 m (1,900 ft)
- Highest elevation: 1,040 m (3,410 ft)
- Lowest elevation: 556 m (1,824 ft)
- Population (2023): 442
  - Density: 168/km^{2} (435/sq mi)
- Time zone: UTC+01:00 (CET)
  - Summer (DST): UTC+02:00 (CEST)
- INSEE/Postal code: 73057 /73570
- ^{1} French Land Register data, which excludes lakes, ponds, glaciers > 1 km^{2} (0.386 sq mi or 247 acres) and river estuaries.

Brides-les-Bains (French pronunciation: [bʁid le bɛ̃]) is a commune in the Savoie department in the Auvergne-Rhône-Alpes region in south-eastern France.

It was an Olympic Village for the 1992 Winter Olympics, based in Albertville, France.

There is easy accessibility via Eurostar direct from London and there is a cable-car link direct to the ski slopes at Méribel, a major resort eight miles (13 km) away. Brides-les-Bains' main attraction to tourists is its convenience for Méribel. The village has a few attractions, including several health spas and a casino, and sites of historic or cultural interest, including the springs from which the town takes its name, a medieval church and a statue made out of piping titled "La Manche de Chapeau" (French: "The Sleeve of a Hat").

== See also ==
- Communes of the Savoie department
