= Césarches =

- Commune
- Location of Césarches
- Location within France Location within Auvergne-Rhône-Alpes
- Coordinates: 45°42′06″N 6°24′45″E
- Country: France
- Region: Auvergne-Rhône-Alpes
- Department: Savoie
- Arrondissement: Albertville
- Canton: Ugine
- Intercommunality: CA Arlysère

Government
  - Mayor (2020–2026): Hervé Muraz-Dulaurier
- Area^{1}: 2.9 km^{2} (1.1 sq mi)
- Highest elevation: 964 m (3,163 ft)
- Lowest elevation: 347 m (1,138 ft)
- Population (2023): 441
  - Density: 150/km^{2} (390/sq mi)
- Demonym: Césarchois
- Time zone: UTC+01:00 (CET)
  - Summer (DST): UTC+02:00 (CEST)
- INSEE/Postal code: 73061 /73200
- ^{1} French Land Register data, which excludes lakes, ponds, glaciers > 1 km^{2} (0.386 sq mi or 247 acres) and river estuaries.

Césarches is a commune in the Savoie department in the Auvergne-Rhône-Alpes region in south-eastern France.

== See also ==
- Communes of the Savoie department
