= Flumet =

- Commune
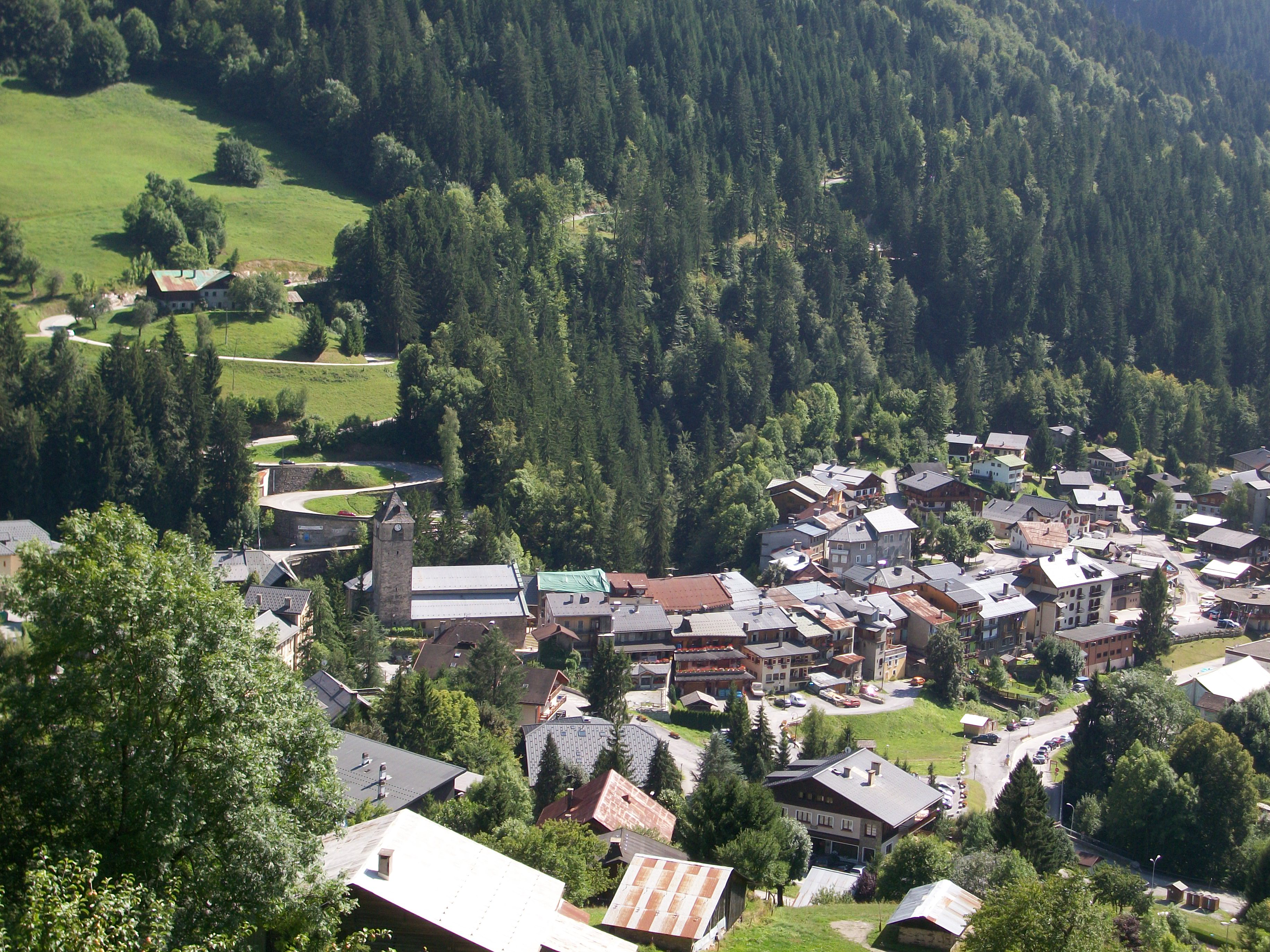
- Flumet seen from the Forêt de Bisanne

- Coat of arms
- Location of Flumet
- Location within France Location within Auvergne-Rhône-Alpes
- Coordinates: 45°49′13″N 6°31′03″E
- Country: France
- Region: Auvergne-Rhône-Alpes
- Department: Savoie
- Arrondissement: Albertville
- Canton: Ugine
- Intercommunality: CA Arlysère

Government
  - Mayor (2020–2026): Marie-Pierre Ouvrier
- Area^{1}: 17.15 km^{2} (6.62 sq mi)
- Highest elevation: 1,930 m (6,330 ft)
- Lowest elevation: 854 m (2,802 ft)
- Population (2023): 799
  - Density: 46.6/km^{2} (121/sq mi)
- Time zone: UTC+01:00 (CET)
  - Summer (DST): UTC+02:00 (CEST)
- INSEE/Postal code: 73114 /73590
- ^{1} French Land Register data, which excludes lakes, ponds, glaciers > 1 km^{2} (0.386 sq mi or 247 acres) and river estuaries.

Flumet (French pronunciation: [flymɛ]) is a commune in the Savoie department in the Auvergne-Rhône-Alpes region in south-eastern France.

== See also ==
- Communes of the Savoie department
