= Crest-Voland =

- Commune
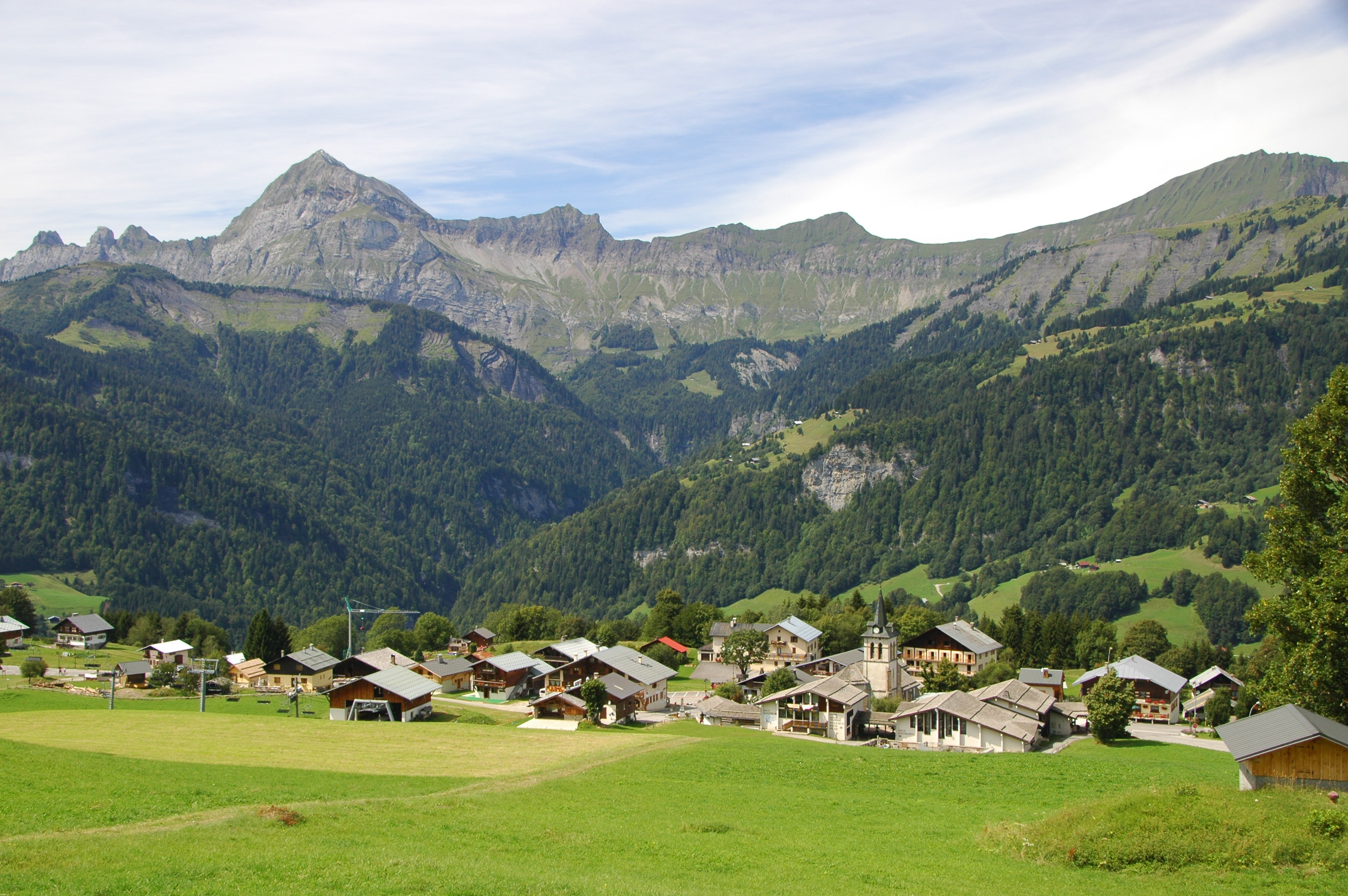
- A general view of the village
- Location of Crest-Voland
- Location within France Location within Auvergne-Rhône-Alpes
- Coordinates: 45°47′45″N 6°30′23″E
- Country: France
- Region: Auvergne-Rhône-Alpes
- Department: Savoie
- Arrondissement: Albertville
- Canton: Ugine
- Intercommunality: CA Arlysère

Government
  - Mayor (2020–2026): Christophe Rambaud
- Area^{1}: 9.96 km^{2} (3.85 sq mi)
- Highest elevation: 1,691 m (5,548 ft)
- Lowest elevation: 680 m (2,230 ft)
- Population (2023): 346
  - Density: 34.7/km^{2} (90.0/sq mi)
- Time zone: UTC+01:00 (CET)
  - Summer (DST): UTC+02:00 (CEST)
- INSEE/Postal code: 73094 /73590
- ^{1} French Land Register data, which excludes lakes, ponds, glaciers > 1 km^{2} (0.386 sq mi or 247 acres) and river estuaries.

Crest-Voland (French pronunciation: [kʁe vɔlɑ̃]) is a commune in the Savoie department in the Auvergne-Rhône-Alpes region in south-eastern France.

== See also ==
- Communes of the Savoie department
