= Beaufortain =

Valley in the French Alps

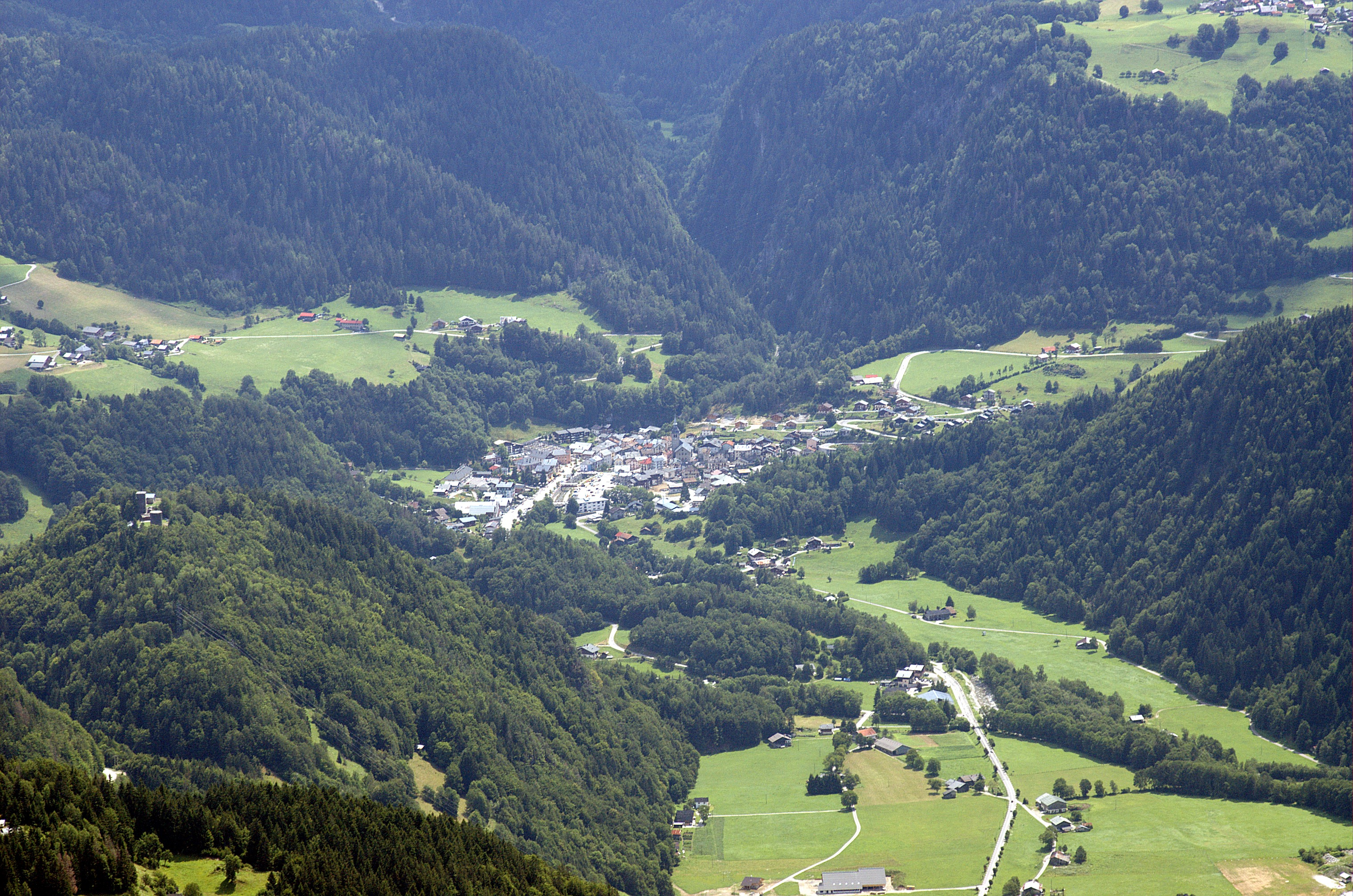
- The commune and hamlets of Beaufort, at the heart of Beaufortain
- Length: 30 km (19 mi) southeast

Geology
- Type: Glacial

Geography
- Coordinates: 45°44′N 6°33′E
- Interactive map of Beaufortain

Beaufortain is a valley in the Savoie department in the Auvergne-Rhône-Alpes region in Southeastern France. It extends around the commune of Beaufort.

== See also ==
- Beaufortain Massif
