= Petit-Cœur =

Petit-Cœur Pchokwér/Ptchokour (Savoyard)
- Delegated commune of La Léchère
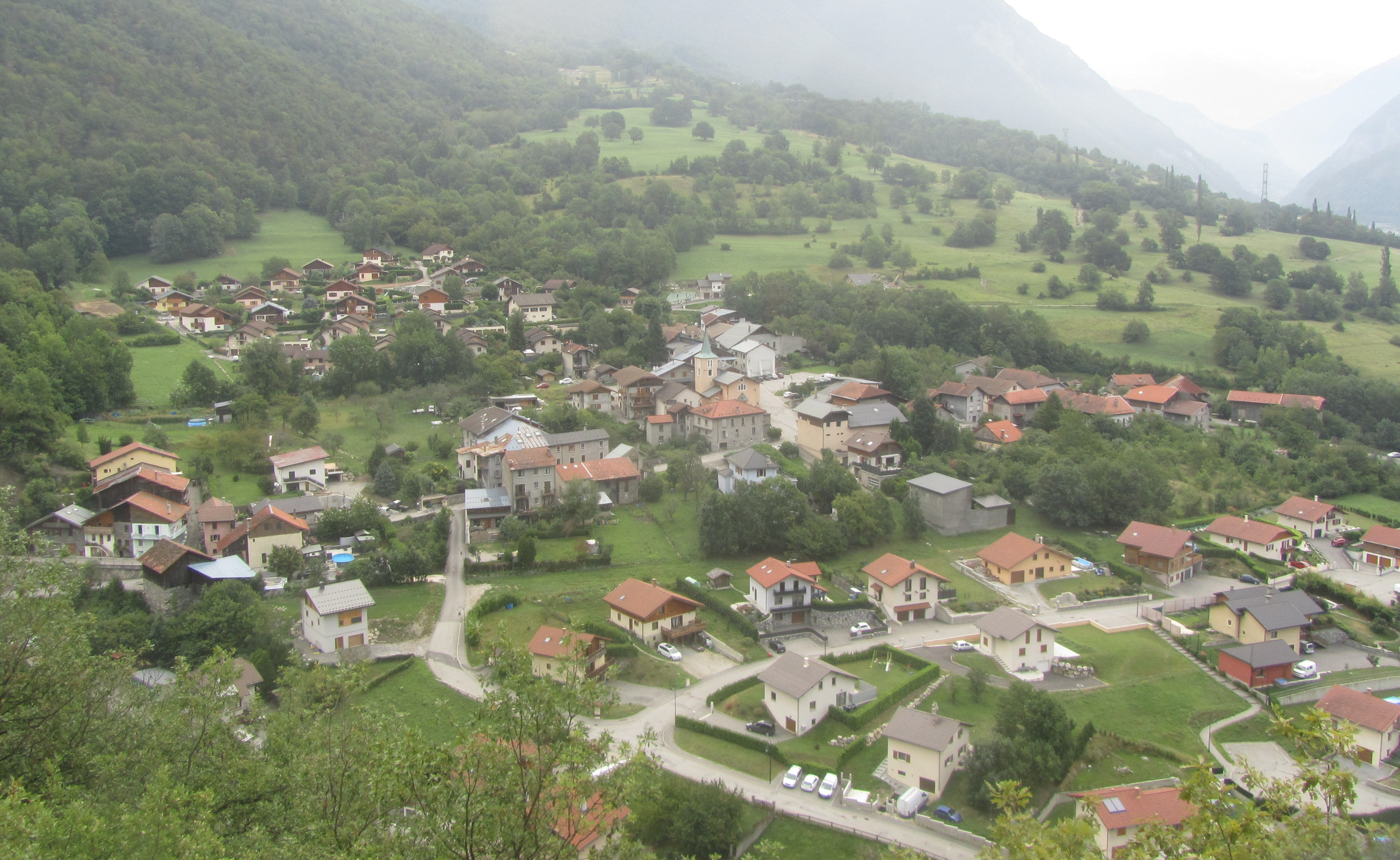
- Aerial view of Petit-Cœur
- Location of Petit-Cœur
- Location within France Location within Auvergne-Rhône-Alpes
- Coordinates: 45.52360°N 6.49249°E
- Country: France
- Region: Auvergne-Rhône-Alpes
- Department: Savoie
- Arrondissement: Albertville
- Canton: Moûtiers
- Commune: La Léchère
- Elevation: 1,350 m (4,430 ft)
- Population (2023): 554
- Time zone: UTC+01:00 (CET)
  - Summer (DST): UTC+02:00 (CEST)
- Postal code: 73260

Petit-Cœur (Savoyard: Pchokwér or Ptchokour) is a former commune in the Savoie department of southeastern France. In 1972, it was merged with five other communes to form the commune of La Léchère. Since 2019, it is a delegated commune of La Léchère.

== Toponymy ==
The Old French words cort, cour, court and cuert designate a farm or agricultural holding. The place name appears to derive from the Medieval Latin cortis.

The parish was formerly known as Saint-Eusèbe and Saint-Eusèbe-de-Cœur until the invasion by French Revolutionary troops, when the name was changed in 1795 to Petit-Cœur.

In Savoyard Arpitan, the name of Petit-Cœur is written Pchokwér or Ptchokour in the Conflans orthography.

== History ==
In 1972, Petit-Cœur merged with Celliers, Doucy, Naves, Notre-Dame-de-Briançon and Pussy to form the commune of La Léchère. Petit-Cœur had the status of an associated commune until 2019. Following the absorption of Bonneval and Feissons-sur-Isère by La Léchère, it became a delegated commune.

== Demographics ==
Historical population

| Year | Pop. | ±% p.a. |
|---|---|---|
| 1793 | 157 | — |
| 1800 | 160 | +0.27% |
| 1806 | 191 | +3.00% |
| 1821 | 216 | +0.82% |
| 1836 | 206 | −0.32% |
| 1846 | 243 | +1.67% |
| 1856 | 227 | −0.68% |
| 1861 | 229 | +0.18% |
| 1866 | 210 | −1.72% |
| 1872 | 230 | +1.53% |
| 1876 | 213 | −1.90% |
| 1881 | 183 | −2.99% |
| 1886 | 199 | +1.69% |
| 1891 | 202 | +0.30% |

| Year | Pop. | ±% p.a. |
|---|---|---|
| 1896 | 191 | −1.11% |
| 1901 | 307 | +9.96% |
| 1906 | 318 | +0.71% |
| 1911 | 350 | +1.94% |
| 1921 | 390 | +1.09% |
| 1926 | 448 | +2.81% |
| 1931 | 742 | +10.62% |
| 1936 | 785 | +1.13% |
| 1946 | 721 | −0.85% |
| 1954 | 1,033 | +4.60% |
| 1962 | 1,032 | −0.01% |
| 1968 | 954 | −1.30% |
| 2016 | 561 | −1.10% |
| 2023 | 554 | −0.18% |

Source: EHESS and INSEE

== Culture and heritage ==
The church of Saint Eusebius of Petit-Cœur is probably a reconstruction from the late 17th century.

=== Notable people ===
- Georges Peizerat (1911–1975), French politician, was born in Petit-Cœur.

=== See also ===
- La Léchère
