= Feissons-sur-Salins =

- Commune
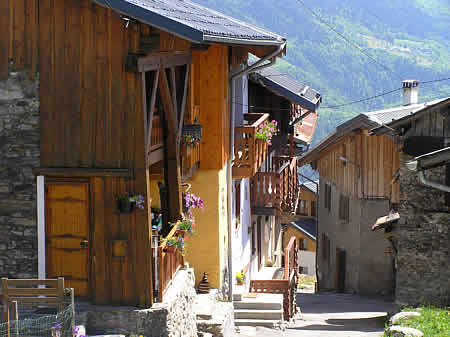
- A street in Feissons-sur-Salins
- Location of Feissons-sur-Salins
- Location within France Location within Auvergne-Rhône-Alpes
- Coordinates: 45°28′17″N 6°33′39″E
- Country: France
- Region: Auvergne-Rhône-Alpes
- Department: Savoie
- Arrondissement: Albertville
- Canton: Moûtiers

Government
  - Mayor (2020–2026): Gabriel Blanc
- Area^{1}: 4.8 km^{2} (1.9 sq mi)
- Highest elevation: 1,756 m (5,761 ft)
- Lowest elevation: 760 m (2,490 ft)
- Population (2023): 175
  - Density: 36/km^{2} (94/sq mi)
- Time zone: UTC+01:00 (CET)
  - Summer (DST): UTC+02:00 (CEST)
- INSEE/Postal code: 73113 /73350
- ^{1} French Land Register data, which excludes lakes, ponds, glaciers > 1 km^{2} (0.386 sq mi or 247 acres) and river estuaries.

Feissons-sur-Salins (French pronunciation: [fɛsɔ̃ syʁ salɛ̃], lit. 'Feissons on Salins') is a commune in the Savoie department in the Auvergne-Rhône-Alpes region in south-eastern France.

== See also ==
- Communes of the Savoie department
