= Rinaldone culture =

Eneolithic culture in 3–4 BCE

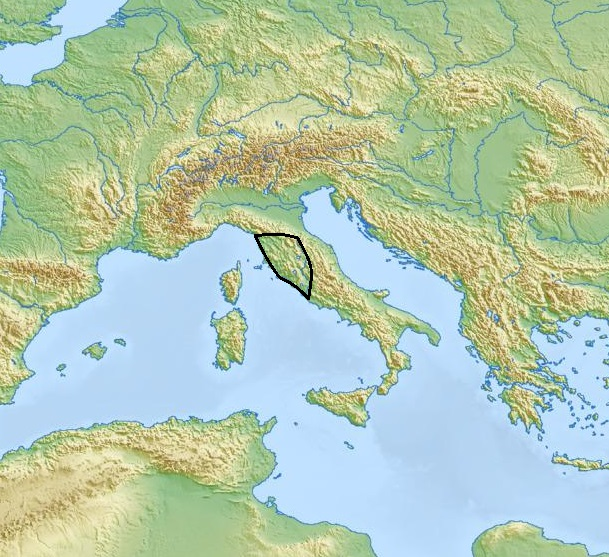
- Geographical range: Central Italy
- Period: Chalcolithic
- Dates: 3700-2100 BC
- Type site: Rinaldone
- Preceded by: Neolithic Italy
- Followed by: Bell Beaker culture

The Rinaldone culture was an Eneolithic culture that spread between the 4th and the 3rd millennium BC in northern and central Lazio, in southern Tuscany and, to a lesser extent, also in Marche and Umbria. It takes its name from the town of Rinaldone, near Montefiascone in the province of Viterbo, northern Lazio.

== Story ==
The Rinaldone culture developed between 3700 and 2100 BC in the centre of the Italian peninsula. It therefore covers most of the Chalcolithic, referred to here as Eneolithic. It was defined in 1939 by Italian archeologist Pia Laviosa Zambotti based, among other things, on the characteristics of the Rinaldone necropolis in the region of Viterbo.

The original definition of this culture has, of course, evolved since 1939. Many researchers now describe it as a facies and even a funeral facies. Even today, it is still documented almost exclusively by funeral sites. The definition of this culture (or facies) is problematic since it is based only on very limited elements and rarely specific to this region and this period, for example a particular type of vase which, in fact, is only present in part of the tombs.

Typical objects of this culture are the flask-shaped jars, decorative elements such as antimony necklace, bone beads, steatite pendants and a considerable number of weapons including mallet heads, arrowheads, spears and daggers.

One of the most famous funerary contexts belonging to this culture is the so-called "widow's tomb" discovered in 1951 in Ponte San Pietro, near Ischia di Castro. It contains the remains of a 30-year-old man of high rank, with a rich collection of pottery and weapons, and a young woman with a much more modest outfit, who was probably sacrificed to be buried with her husband.

== Chronology, development area and influences ==
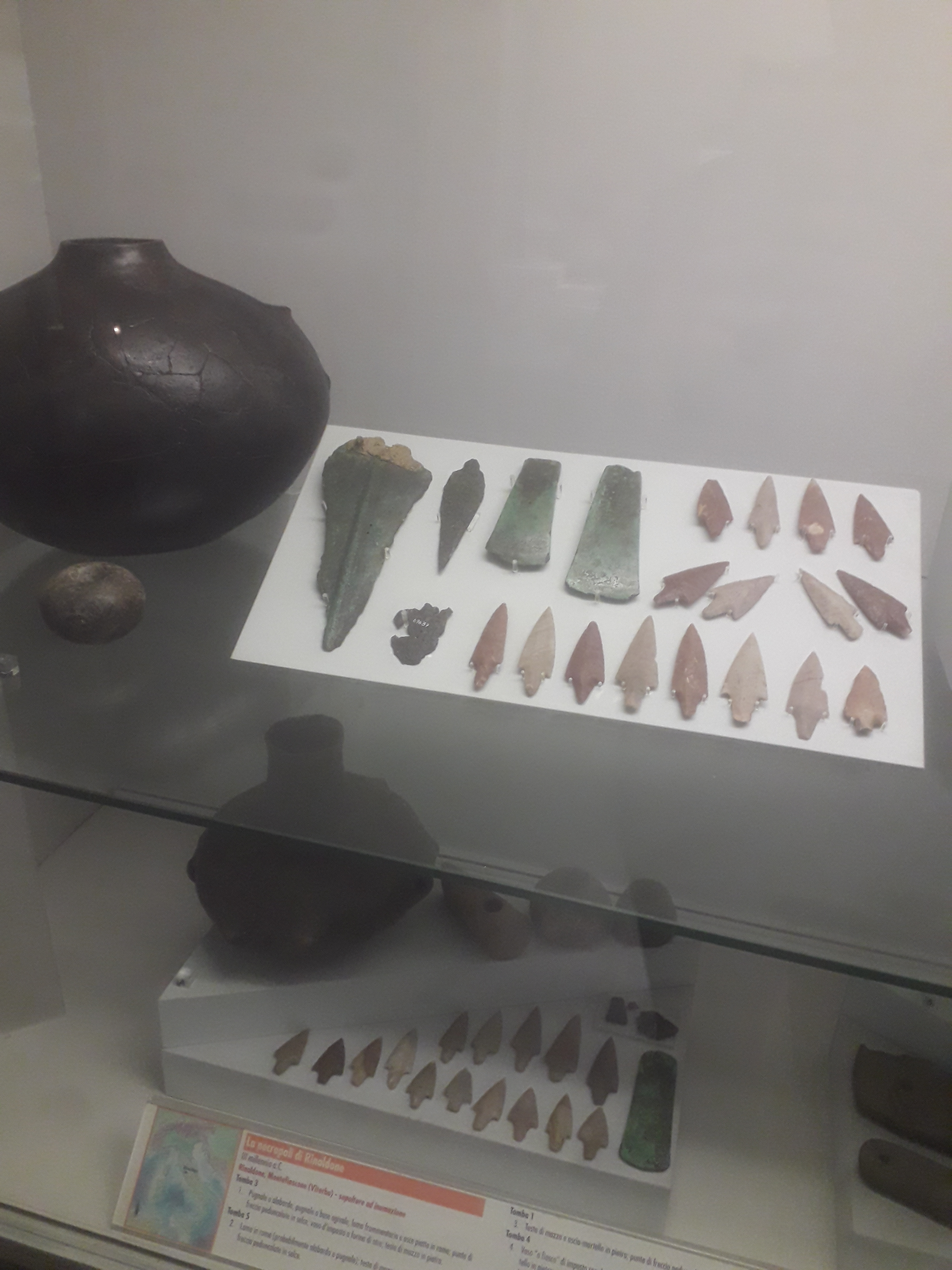
Rinaldone material culture objects

=== Chronology ===
Until the 1990s, there was almost no clear carbon-14 dating attributable to this culture. The situation has since evolved, in particular thanks to the numerous dates carried out on the burials of the Selvicciola necropolis in the north of Lazio. This culture begins around 3700 BC and ends around 2100 BC. Its duration is therefore exceptionally long. It is still too early to propose internal subdivisions. The axes are distinguished by a different composition from other objects.

=== Development area ===
The sites attributable to the Rinaldone culture are mainly located in the north and centre of Lazio, in the south and centre of Tuscany and to a lesser extent in Umbria. However, contrary to what was initially assumed there are also sites south of the Tiber, especially in the region of Rome. It is also proven from the beginning its development in the region of Marche, but in this region, the characteristic fiascoes of this culture are rare and quickly the entire eastern part of the Apennines seems to be undergoing autonomous cultural development. It appears punctually as far as Abruzzo.

In the most recent phase, it even seems to extend southwards to Lazio where it replaces the Gaudo culture. However, the borders with other cultures are particularly blurred. In central Lazio, the Rinaldone culture coexists alongside the Gaudo culture and Ortucchio culture between 3130 and 2870 BC and even beyond.

=== Influences ===
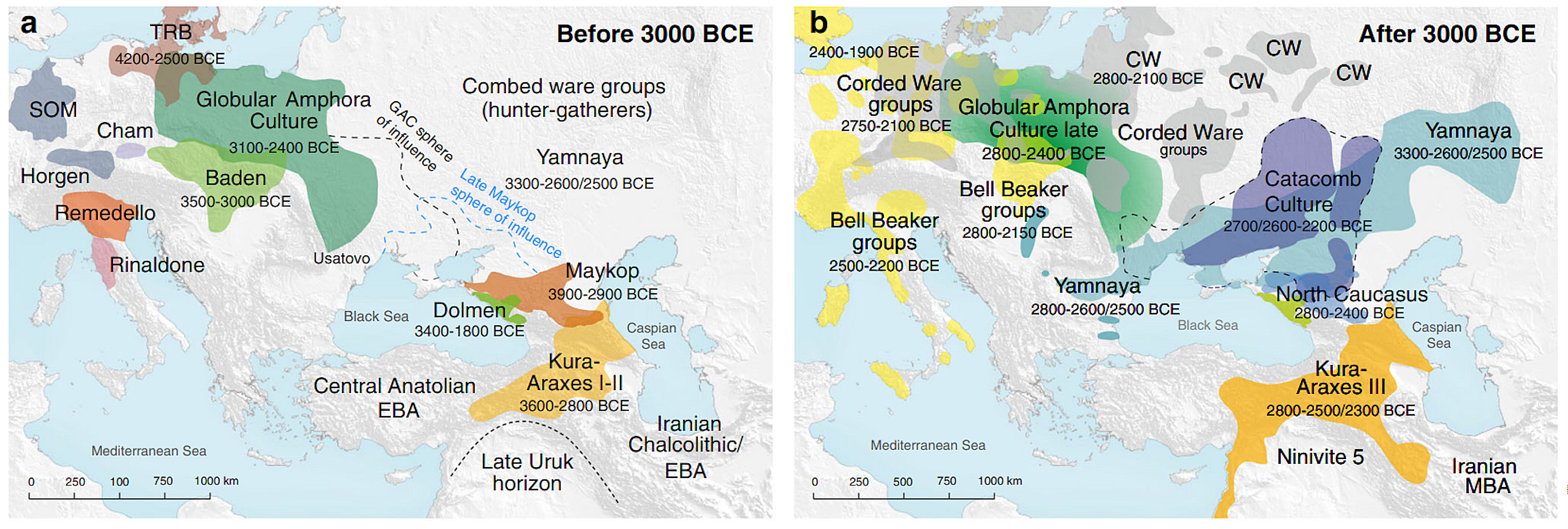
The spread of the Rinaldone culture and Remedello culture before 3000 B.C. (on the left), and the subsequent spread of the Bell Beaker culture after 3000 B.C.

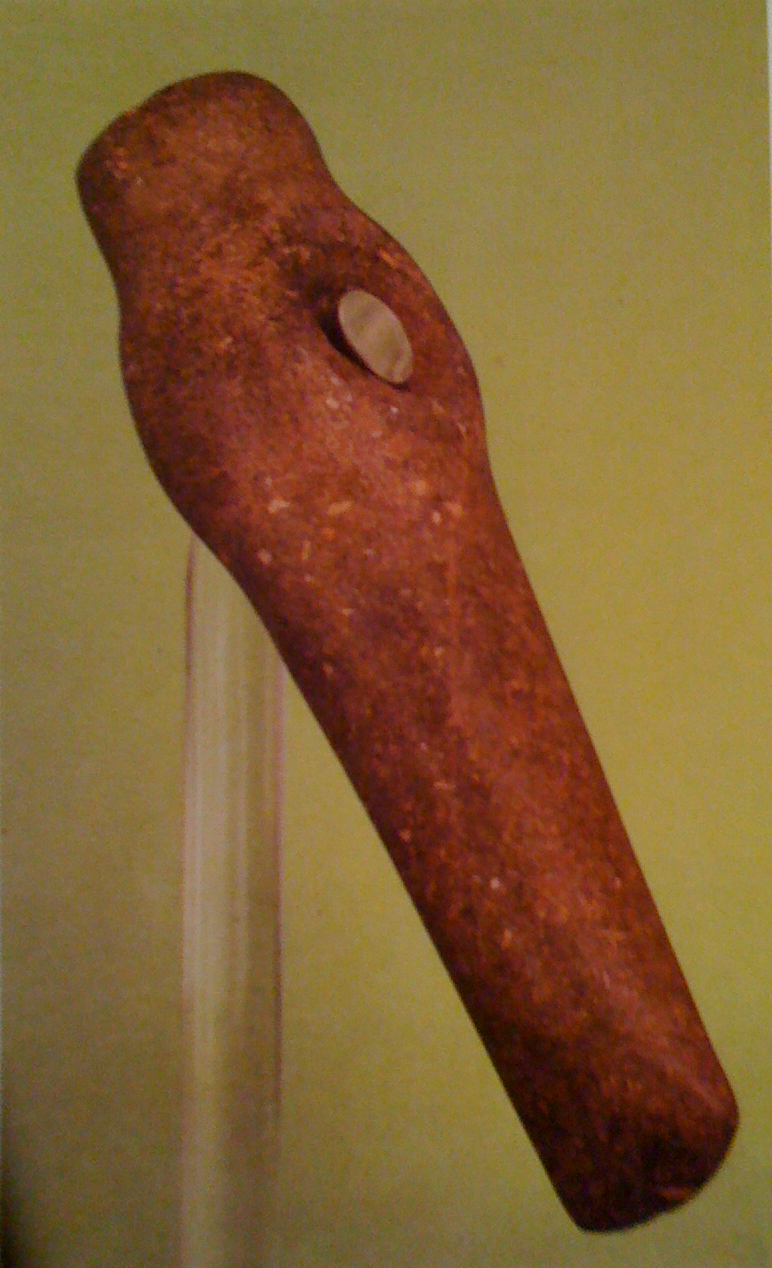
Axe

The influences of the Rinaldone culture beyond its main development area are visible in the presence of objects inspired or directly derived from it. Metal objects can be found in the south of France, probably of Italian origin, as in Fontaine-le-Puits in Savoie. Several copper daggers supposedly of Rinaldone origin have even been discovered in Switzerland. According to some researchers, the culture of Rinaldone was at the origin of the development of the metallurgy in the south of France. There are strong similarities between the latter and the metallurgical practices attested to at Cabrières in Hérault. However, this hypothesis is discussed due to the lack of data on possible relays between central Italy and southern France.

On the other hand, Rinaldone's culture is not impervious to external influences. There is even a facies derived from this culture in Tuscany that bears the name of the cave in which it was identified, the facies of Sassi Neri. In the eponymous site but also in neighbouring sites such as the Fontino cave near Grosseto and the San Giuseppe cave in Elba Island, the objects, especially the vases, have characteristics that bring them closer to the cultures of Rinaldone, Gaudo Culture and Laterza Culture. Relationships between Rinaldone's and Gaudo's culture are also visible in the Rome region. In a tomb in Tenuta della Selcetta 2 vases of both cultures are associated. Similarly, in Osteria del Curato-Via Cinquefrondi, in a necropolis Laterza Culture-Ortucchio Culture, a female tomb containing Rinaldone, Laterza and Gaudo ceramics has been exhumed. In addition, the structure of the tombs, the funeral ritual and the presence in both cases of long arrowheads bring the cultures of Rinaldone and Gaudo closer together.

However, these mutual influences remain generally rare and limited to rather general aspects. This relative closure of Rinaldone's culture to external influences is particularly visible during the development of the Bell Beaker around 2600 BC. Outside the necropolis of Fontanile di Raim in northern Lazio. where the two cultures seem to mix, there are generally sites whose furniture refers entirely to one or the other.

== Main sites ==
- Bandita San Pantaleo (Lazio)
- Casale del Dolce (Lazio)
- Camerano (Marche)
- Fontanile di Raim (Lazio)
- Fontenoce di Recanati (Marche)
- Garavicchio (Tuscany)
- Le Calle (Tuscany)
- Lucrezia Romana (Lazio)
- Lunghezzina (Lazio)
- Osteria del Curato-Via Cinquefrondi (Lazio)
- Ponte delle Sette Miglia (Lazio)
- Ponte San Pietro (Lazio)
- Rinaldone (Lazio)
- Romanina (Lazio)
- Selvicciola (Lazio)
- Tenuta della Mandriola (Latium)

== Genetics ==
Antonio et al. (2019) analyzed the genetics of a male from a Chalcolithic site in southern Lazio at the foothill of Monti Ausoni, assigned to both Rinaldone and Gaudo culture; he was buried in Monte San Biagio, Italy, between ca. 3500 BC and 2500 BC, and carried the paternal haplogroup H2 (P96), found in Neolithic Anatolia and in multiple later Neolithic cultures of Europe, and the maternal haplogroup was N1a1a1a3, found in many Neolithic cultures of Europe. His autosomal DNA was a mixture of EEF ancestry (85%) and WHG ancestry (15%), similar to other Copper Age samples from Italy and the rest of Europe, including those from the Remedello culture.

== See also ==
- Prehistoric Italy
- Remedello culture
- Gaudo culture

== Bibliography ==
- Aa.Vv, Le grandi avventure dell'archeologia, VOL 5: Europa e Italia protostorica - Curcio editore, pg.1584-1585-1586
