= Hautecour =

Hautecour may refer to:

- Hautecour, Jura, a commune in the French region of Franche-Comté
- Hautecour, Savoie, a commune in the French region of Rhône-Alpes
