= Feissons-sur-Isère =

Feissons-sur-Isère Fèysson (Savoyard)
- Part of La Léchère
- Coat of arms
- Location of Feissons-sur-Isère
- Location within France Location within Auvergne-Rhône-Alpes
- Coordinates: 45°33′37″N 6°28′17″E
- Country: France
- Region: Auvergne-Rhône-Alpes
- Department: Savoie
- Arrondissement: Albertville
- Canton: Moûtiers
- Commune: La Léchère
- Area^{1}: 12.1 km^{2} (4.7 sq mi)
- Highest elevation: 2,482 m (8,143 ft)
- Lowest elevation: 394 m (1,293 ft)
- Population (2022): 549
  - Density: 45.4/km^{2} (118/sq mi)
- Time zone: UTC+01:00 (CET)
  - Summer (DST): UTC+02:00 (CEST)
- Postal code: 73260
- ^{1} French Land Register data, which excludes lakes, ponds, glaciers > 1 km^{2} (0.386 sq mi or 247 acres) and river estuaries.

Feissons-sur-Isère (French pronunciation: [fɛsɔ̃ syʁ izɛʁ], literally Feissons on Isère; Savoyard: Fèysson) is a former commune in the Savoie department in the Auvergne-Rhône-Alpes region in south-eastern France. On 1 January 2019, it was merged into the commune La Léchère.

== See also ==
- Communes of the Savoie department
