= Salins-les-Thermes =

Salins-les-Thermes Salin (Arpitan)
- Part of Salins-Fontaine
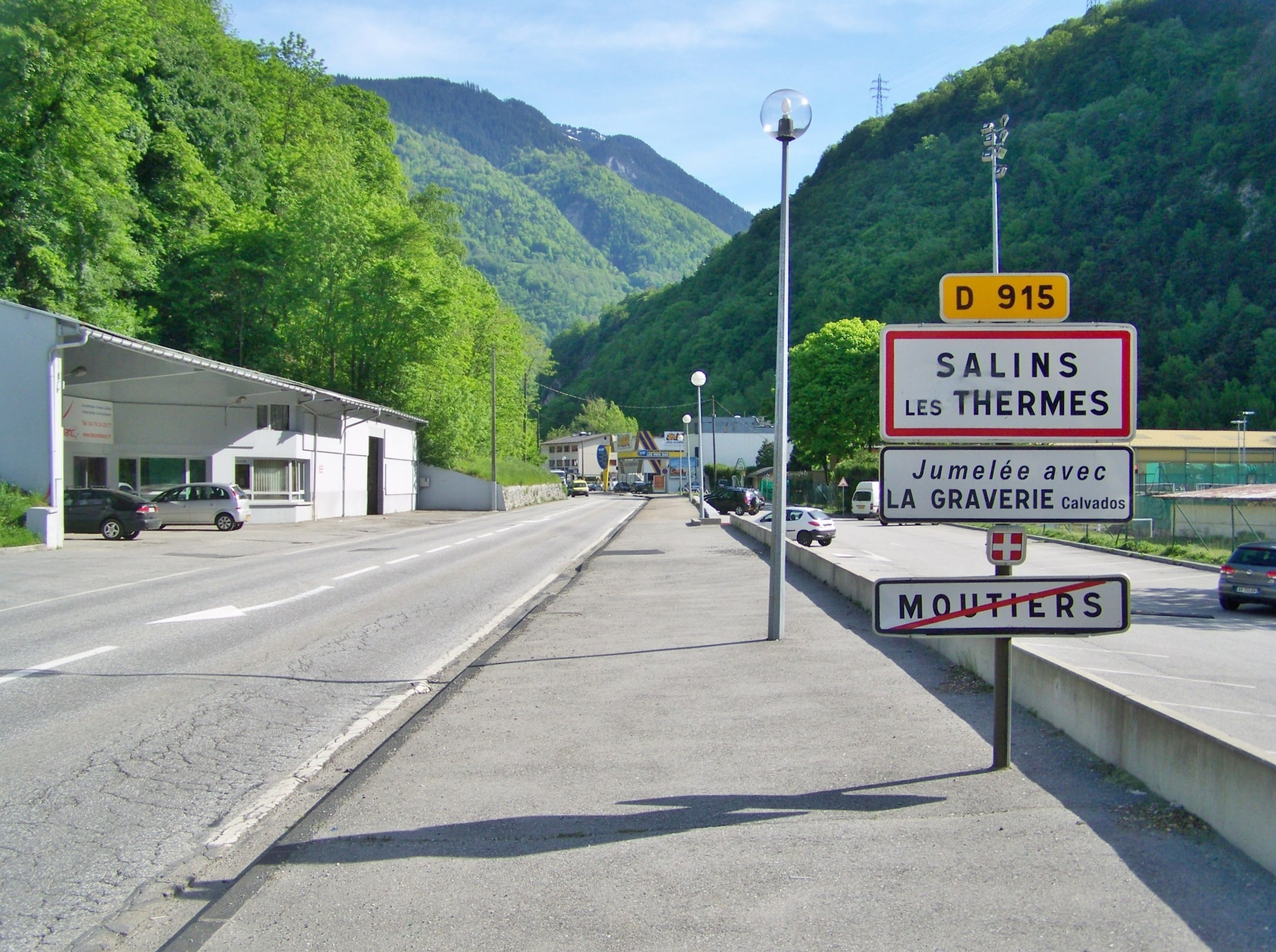
- The road into Salins les Thermes

- Coat of arms
- Location of Salins-les-Thermes
- Location within France Location within Auvergne-Rhône-Alpes
- Coordinates: 45°28′21″N 6°31′46″E
- Country: France
- Region: Auvergne-Rhône-Alpes
- Department: Savoie
- Arrondissement: Albertville
- Canton: Moûtiers
- Commune: Salins-Fontaine
- Area^{1}: 4.17 km^{2} (1.61 sq mi)
- Highest elevation: 1,320 m (4,330 ft)
- Lowest elevation: 469 m (1,539 ft)
- Population (2022): 857
  - Density: 206/km^{2} (532/sq mi)
- Time zone: UTC+01:00 (CET)
  - Summer (DST): UTC+02:00 (CEST)
- Postal code: 73600
- Website: www.salinslesthermes.fr
- ^{1} French Land Register data, which excludes lakes, ponds, glaciers > 1 km^{2} (0.386 sq mi or 247 acres) and river estuaries.

Salins-les-Thermes (French pronunciation: [salɛ̃ le tɛʁm]; Arpitan: Salin) is a former commune in the Savoie department in the Auvergne-Rhône-Alpes region in south-eastern France. On 1 January 2016, it was merged into the new commune of Salins-Fontaine.

== See also ==
- Communes of the Savoie department
