= Laterza culture =

Eneolithic culture in Southern Italy

- Horizon: Chalcolithic
- Geographical range: Southern Italy
- Period: 2950-2350 BC
- Preceded by: Neolithic Italy
- Followed by: Bell Beaker culture

The Laterza culture or Laterza-Cellino San Marco culture is an Eneolithic culture in Southern Italy. It takes its name from the tombs discovered in the locality of Laterza, near Taranto, and Cellino San Marco, near Brindisi, in Apulia. It developed in Apulia and Basilicata, and to a lesser extent of Central Italy in the 3rd millennium BC, around 2950-2350 BC. As with many of the cultures of the late prehistoric period, it is known essentially from the style of pottery recovered from archaeological digs. The culture was defined in 1967 by Francesco Biancofiore, following research in a necropolis of the same name situated to the north-west of the city of Taranto, in southern Apulia.

For a long while this culture was only documented in a few essentially funerary sites. Recent research of large sites, particularly near Rome and others in northern Campania, have extended knowledge of the homes of the culture.

== Chronology and geographic distribution ==
Bell Beaker core/periphery/margin areas during the Early Bronze Age.

The chronology of this cultura has been established thanks to recent discoveries. The culture developed between 2900 and 2300 B.C.. It appeared in central Puglia, Basilicata and on the Tyhrennian shore of Campania and Lazio were the most ancient finds have been discovered. In these last two regions Laterza characteristics overlap with and replace the last manifestations of the Gaudo culture. In some cases these two cultures overlap in the same site, as in Salve, in southern Puglia.

The influence of the Laterza Culture is seen in areas distant from its original territory as evidenced by decoration of pottery. In the necropoli di Selvicciola, a site in northern Lazio attributed to the Rinaldone culture, a jug of Laterza type was discovered. Laterza type decorations are also present in the ceramics of other localities of Central Italy, for example at Maddalena di Muccia in Marche. In Osteria del Curato-via Cinquefrondi, on the periphery of Rome, a tomb was discovered which contained three different styles of pottery: Gaudo, Rinaldone and Laterza.

In Agro romano the Laterza Culture gave birth to the Ortucchio culture (which evolved between 2670 and 2550 B.C. principally from the influence of and contact with Bell Beaker culture) while in other areas it ceased to exist. In Pantano Borghese, near Rome, a site assigned to an advanced state of the Laterza Culture was discovered, contemporaneous with neighbouring sites of the Ortucchio culture. According to scholars it is a cultural enclave which survived in the area.

== Gallery ==
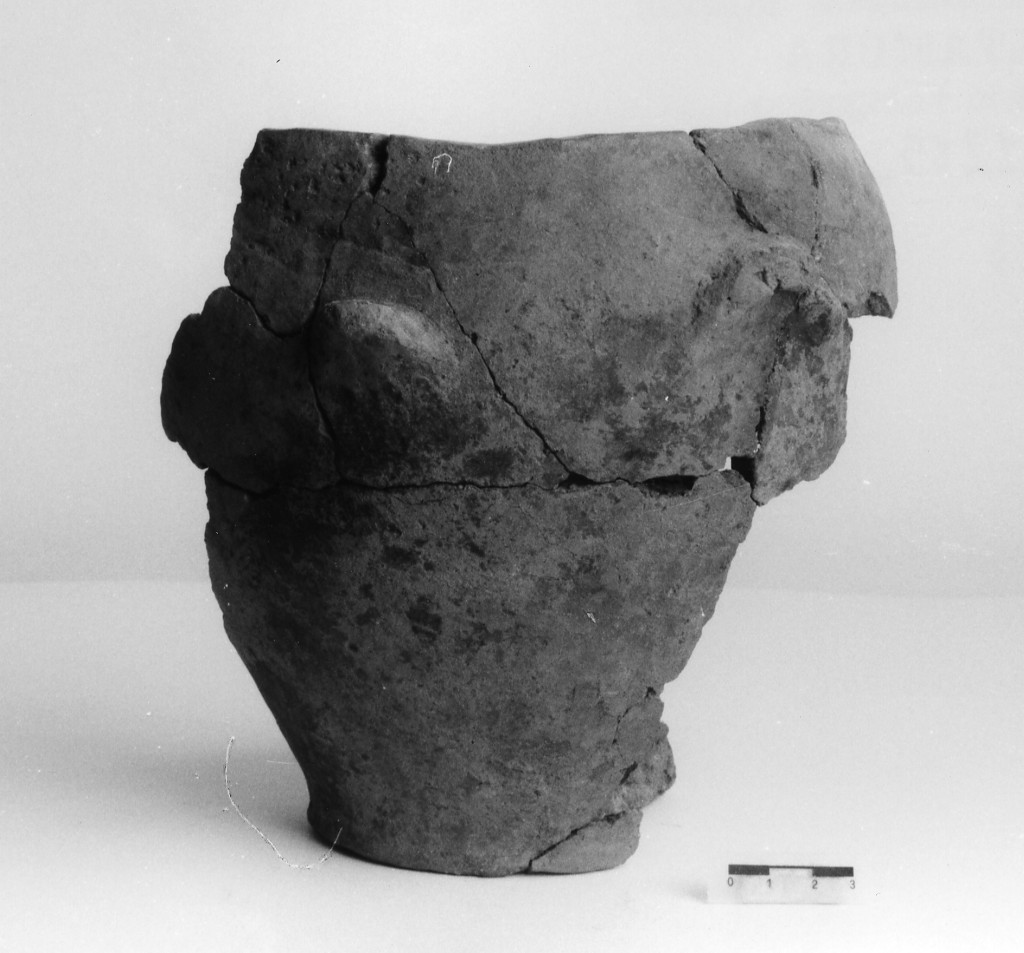
Ceramic pithos

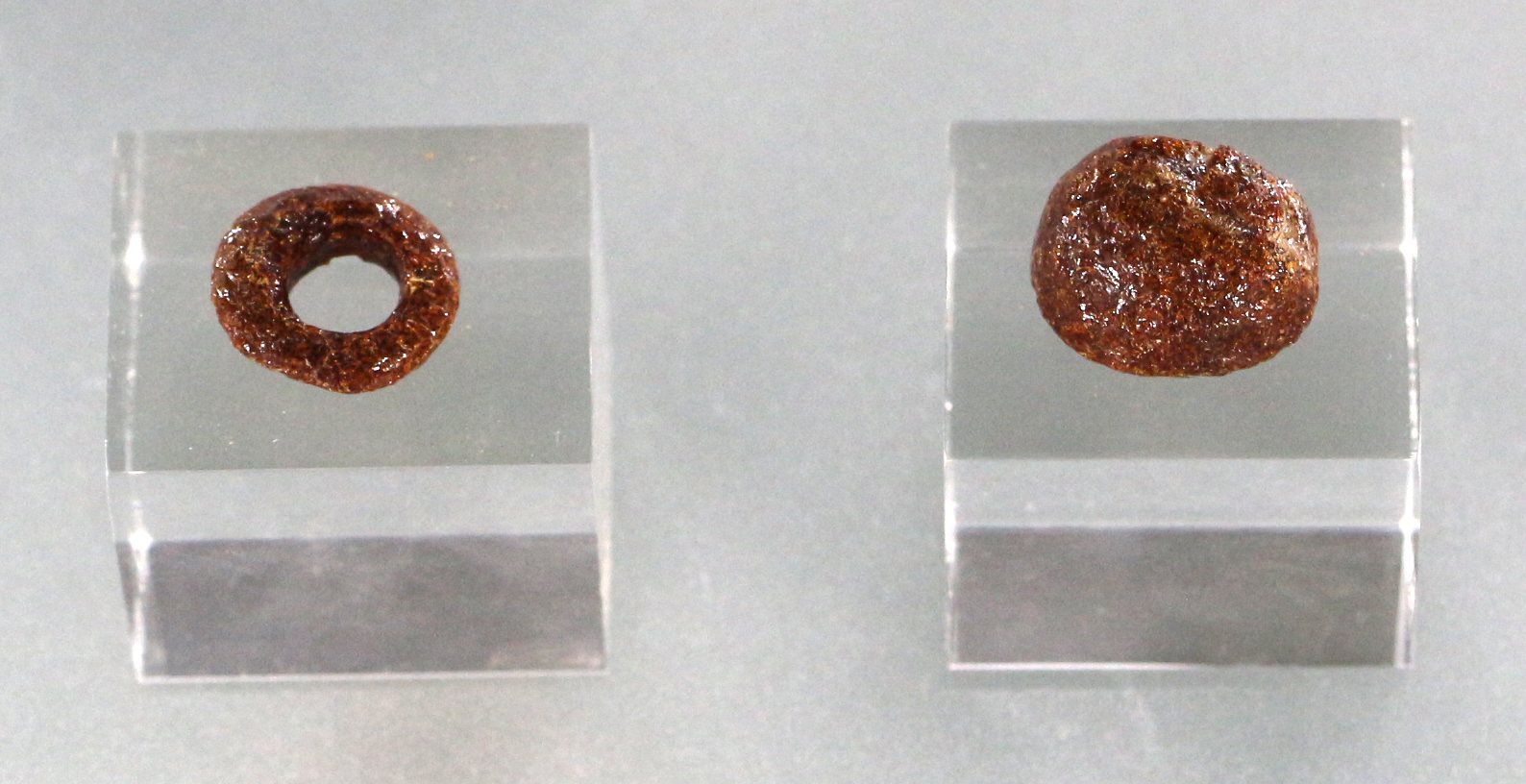
Amber beads

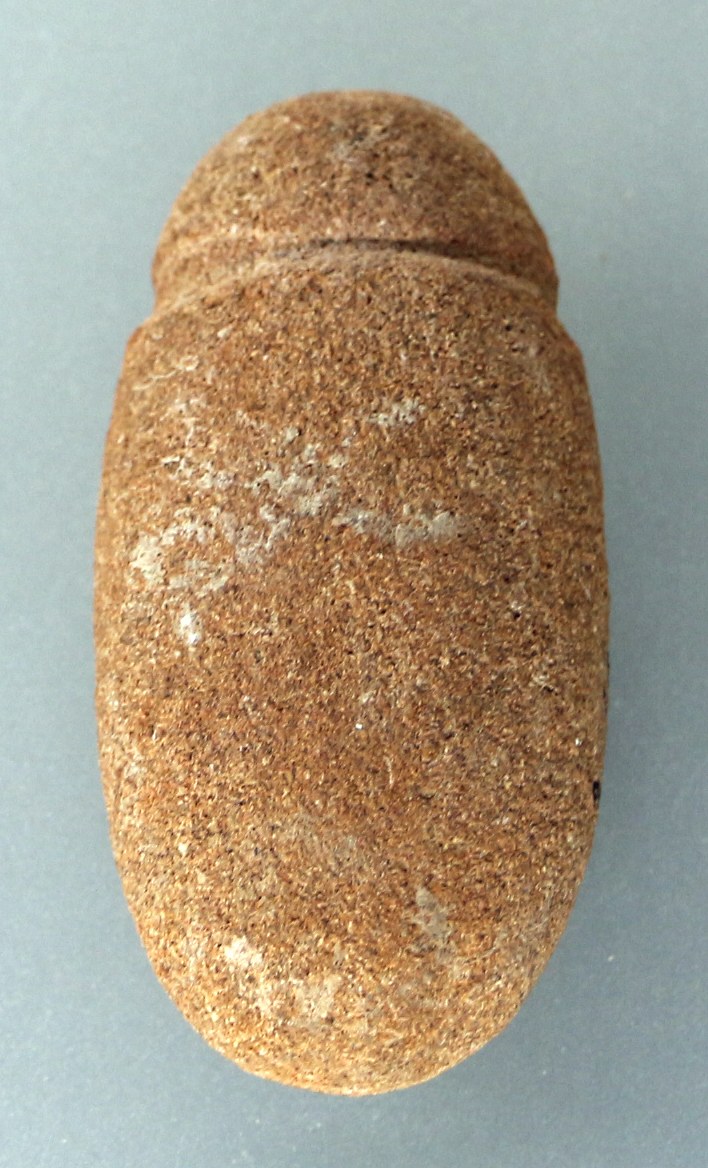

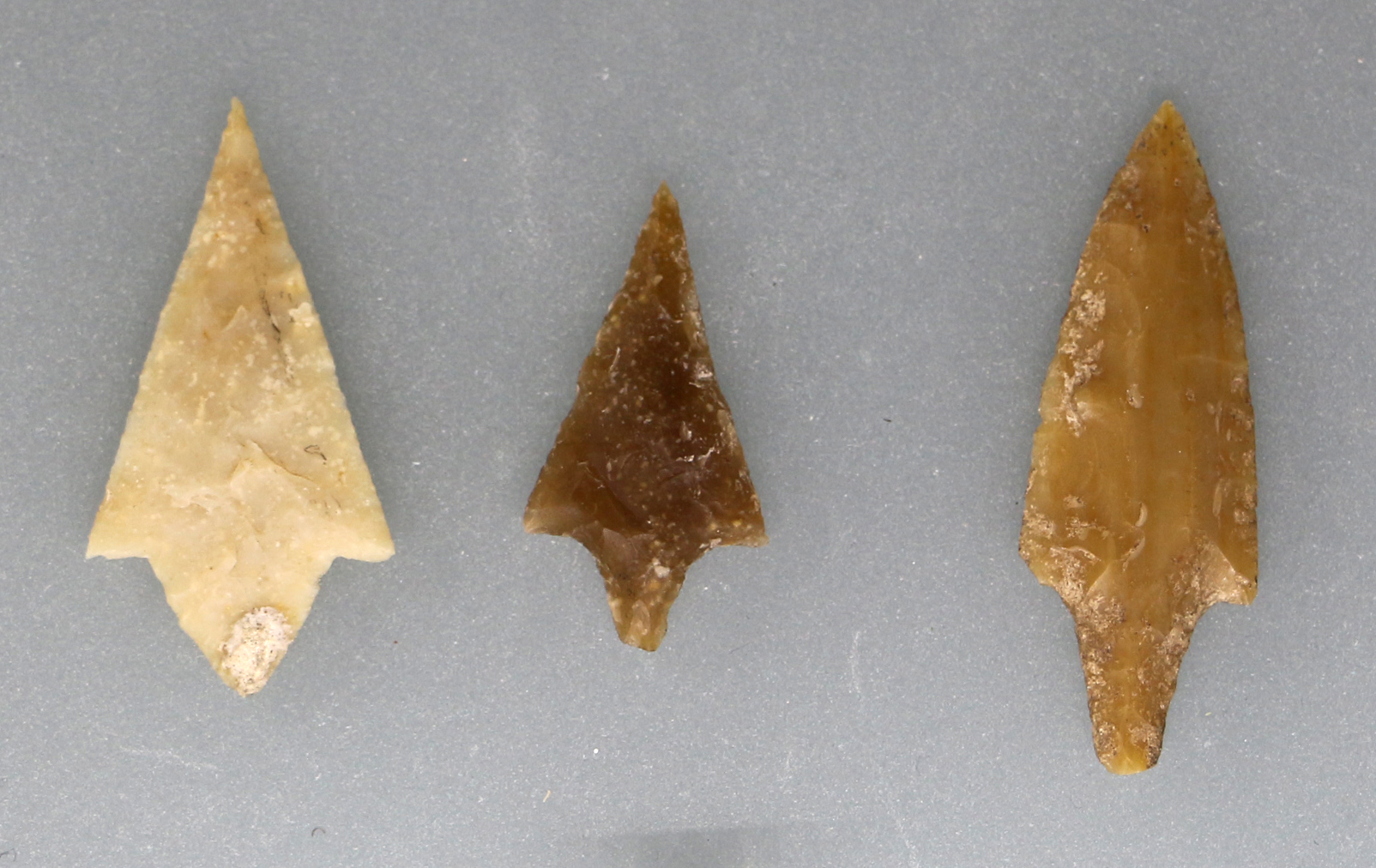

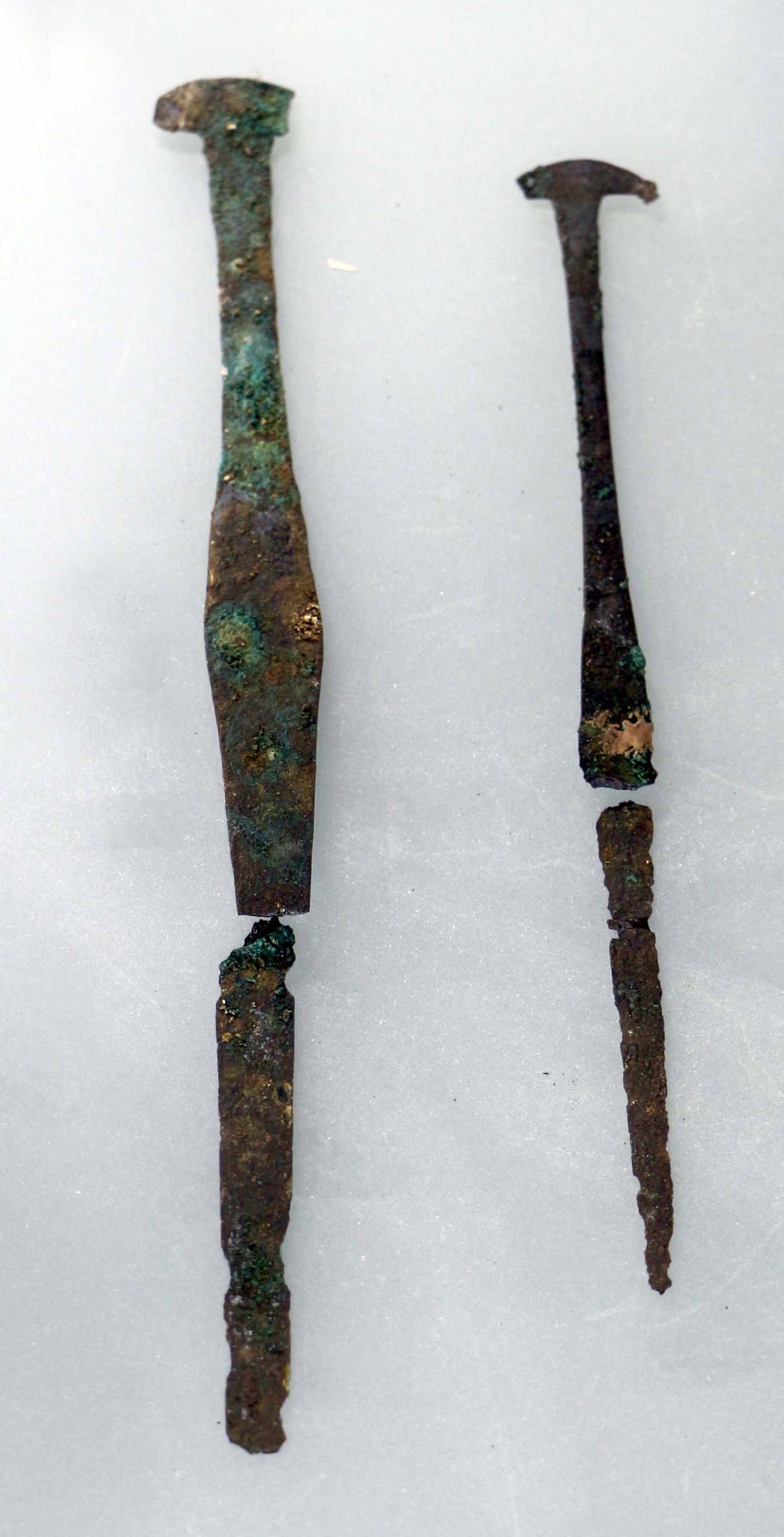
Copper daggers
