= Salins-Fontaine =

- Commune
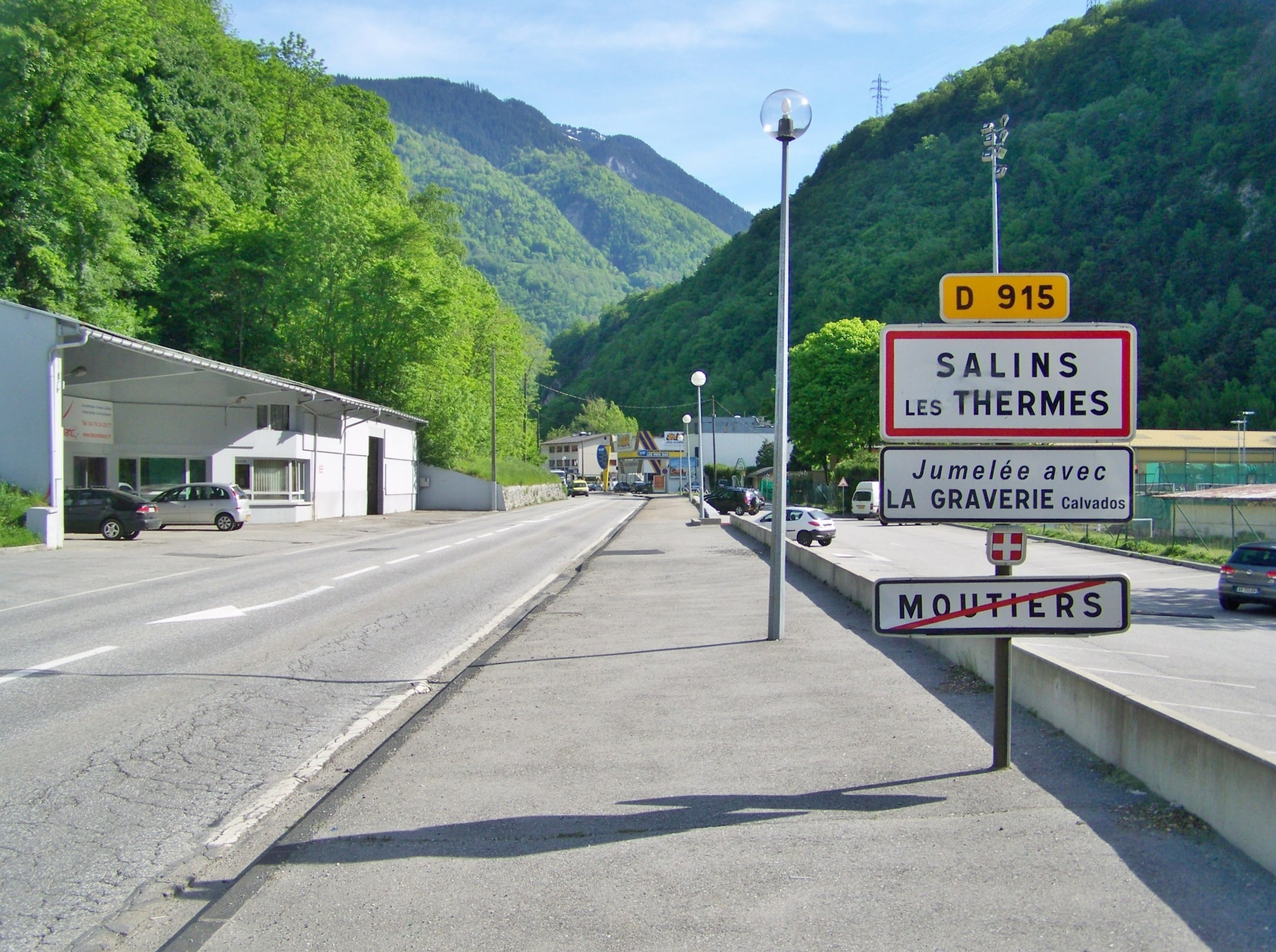
- The road into Salins-les-Thermes
- Location of Salins-Fontaine
- Location within France Location within Auvergne-Rhône-Alpes
- Coordinates: 45°28′19″N 6°31′44″E
- Country: France
- Region: Auvergne-Rhône-Alpes
- Department: Savoie
- Arrondissement: Albertville
- Canton: Moûtiers

Government
  - Mayor (2020–2026): Françoise Crousaz
- Area^{1}: 8.64 km^{2} (3.34 sq mi)
- Population (2023): 941
  - Density: 109/km^{2} (282/sq mi)
- Time zone: UTC+01:00 (CET)
  - Summer (DST): UTC+02:00 (CEST)
- INSEE/Postal code: 73284 /73600
- ^{1} French Land Register data, which excludes lakes, ponds, glaciers > 1 km^{2} (0.386 sq mi or 247 acres) and river estuaries.

Salins-Fontaine (French pronunciation: [salɛ̃ fɔ̃tɛn]) is a commune in the Savoie department of southeastern France. Established on 1 January 2016, it consists of the former communes of Salins-les-Thermes and Fontaine-le-Puits.

== See also ==
- Communes of the Savoie department
