= Bonneval, Savoie =

Bonneval Bnava (Savoyard)
- Part of La Léchère
- Location of Bonneval
- Location within France Location within Auvergne-Rhône-Alpes
- Coordinates: 45°31′11″N 6°27′18″E
- Country: France
- Region: Auvergne-Rhône-Alpes
- Department: Savoie
- Arrondissement: Albertville
- Canton: Moûtiers
- Commune: La Léchère
- Area^{1}: 19.58 km^{2} (7.56 sq mi)
- Highest elevation: 2,493 m (8,179 ft)
- Lowest elevation: 417 m (1,368 ft)
- Population (2022): 91
  - Density: 4.6/km^{2} (12/sq mi)
- Time zone: UTC+01:00 (CET)
  - Summer (DST): UTC+02:00 (CEST)
- Postal code: 73260
- ^{1} French Land Register data, which excludes lakes, ponds, glaciers > 1 km^{2} (0.386 sq mi or 247 acres) and river estuaries.

Bonneval (French pronunciation: [bɔnval]; Savoyard: Bnava) is a former commune in the Savoie department in the Auvergne-Rhône-Alpes region in south-eastern France. On 1 January 2019, it was merged into the commune La Léchère.

== See also ==
- Communes of the Savoie department
