= Les Avanchers-Valmorel =

Les Avanchers-Valmorel Los Avanchiérs (Arpitan)
- Commune
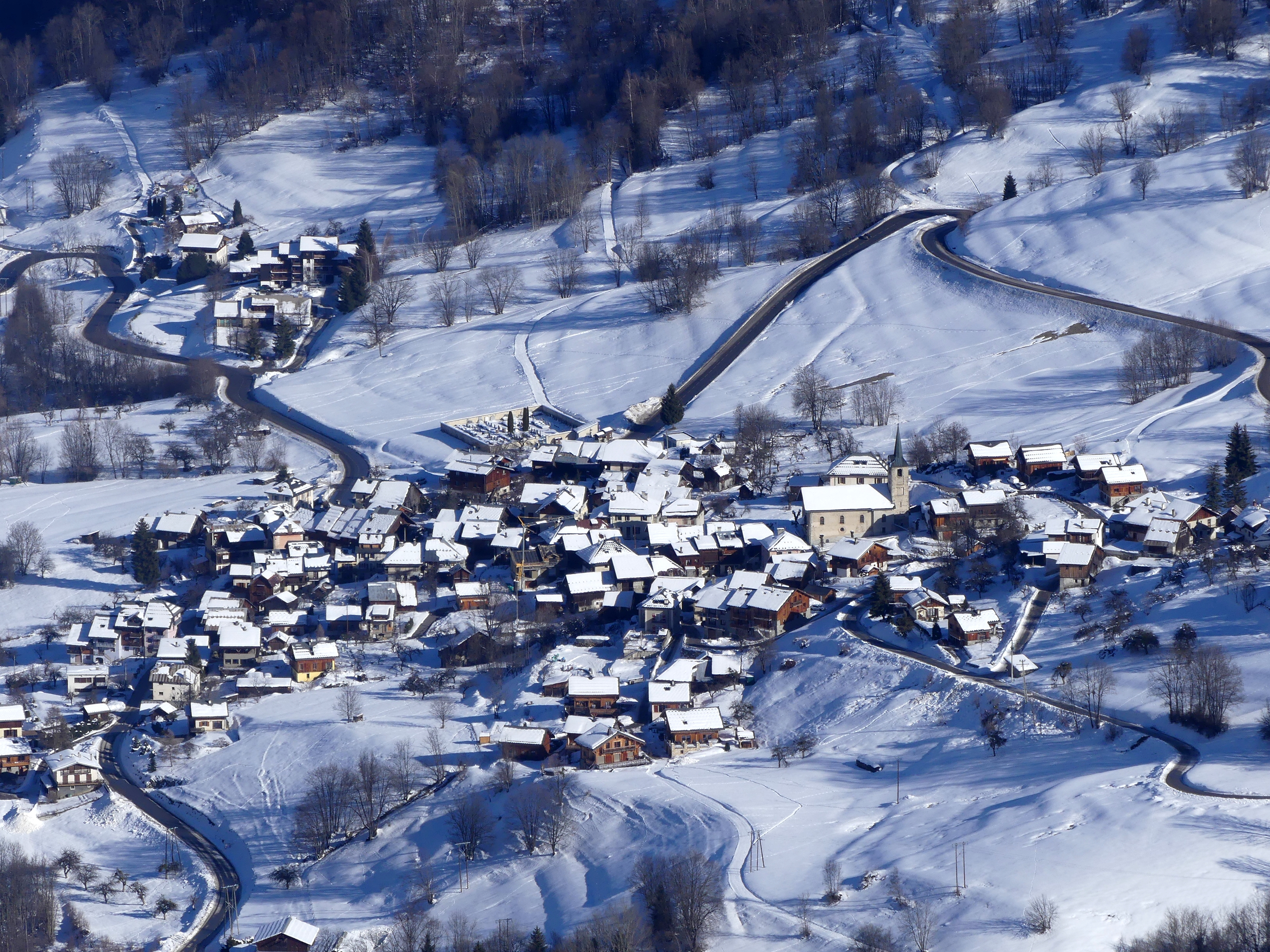
- Les Avanchers seen from the Valmorel ski resort
- Location of Les Avanchers-Valmorel
- Location within France Location within Auvergne-Rhône-Alpes
- Coordinates: 45°28′43″N 6°27′24″E
- Country: France
- Region: Auvergne-Rhône-Alpes
- Department: Savoie
- Arrondissement: Albertville
- Canton: Moûtiers

Government
  - Mayor (2020–2026): Jean-Michel Vorger
- Area^{1}: 21.93 km^{2} (8.47 sq mi)
- Highest elevation: 2,600 m (8,500 ft)
- Lowest elevation: 680 m (2,230 ft)
- Population (2023): 724
  - Density: 33.0/km^{2} (85.5/sq mi)
- Time zone: UTC+01:00 (CET)
  - Summer (DST): UTC+02:00 (CEST)
- INSEE/Postal code: 73024 /73260
- Website: www.lesavanchers.fr
- ^{1} French Land Register data, which excludes lakes, ponds, glaciers > 1 km^{2} (0.386 sq mi or 247 acres) and river estuaries.

Les Avanchers-Valmorel (Savoyard Arpitan: Los Avanchiérs), also known simply as Les Avanchers, is a commune in the Savoie department in the Auvergne-Rhône-Alpes region in Southeastern France. As of 2023, the population of the commune was 724.

== See also ==
- Communes of the Savoie department
