= La Léchère =

- Commune
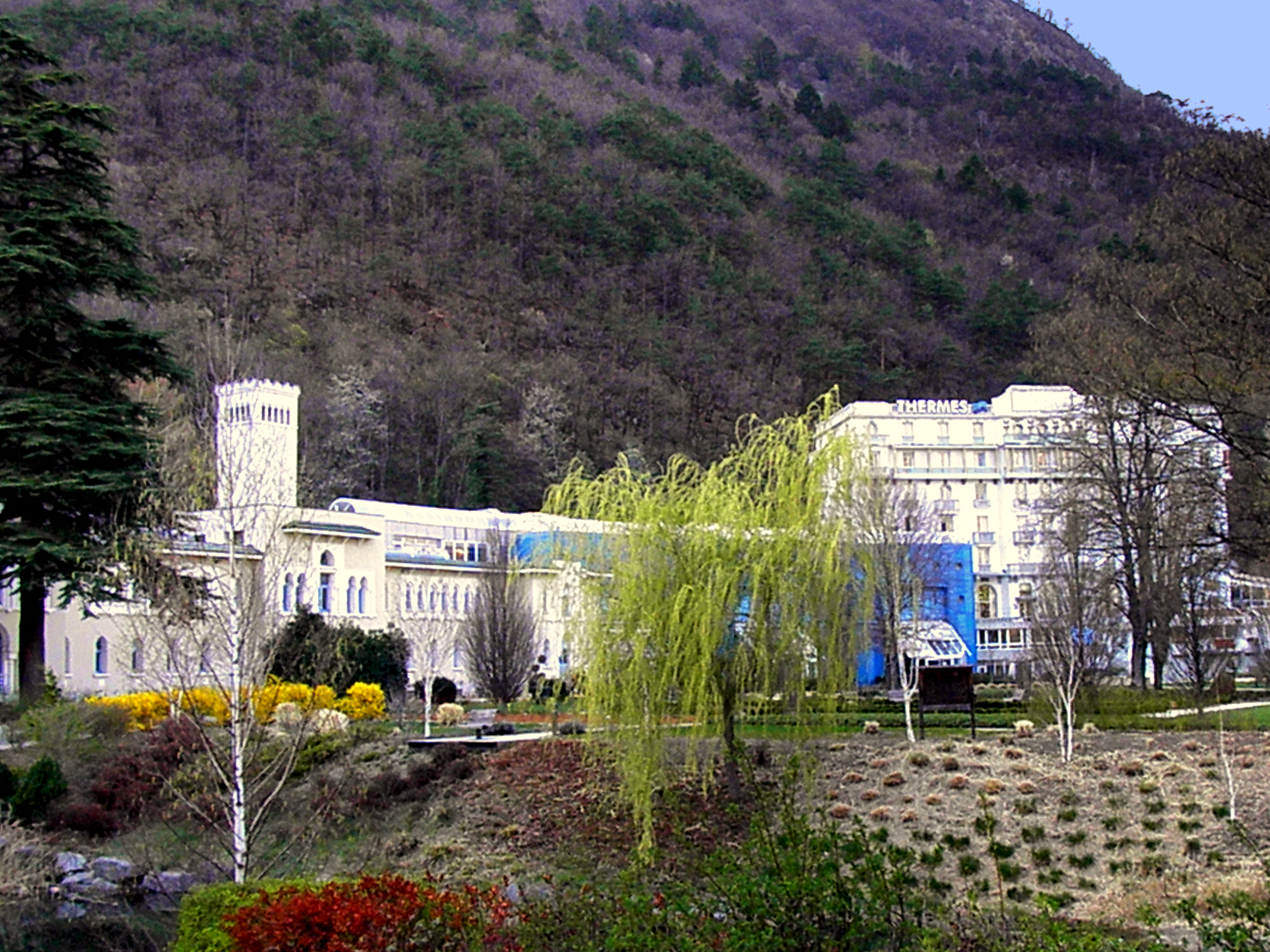
- The spa in La Léchère
- Location of La Léchère
- Location within France Location within Auvergne-Rhône-Alpes
- Coordinates: 45°31′59″N 6°28′27″E
- Country: France
- Region: Auvergne-Rhône-Alpes
- Department: Savoie
- Arrondissement: Albertville
- Canton: Moûtiers
- Intercommunality: Vallées d'Aigueblanche

Government
  - Mayor (2022–2026): Dominique Colliard
- Area^{1}: 134.54 km^{2} (51.95 sq mi)
- Highest elevation: 2,829 m (9,281 ft)
- Lowest elevation: 394 m (1,293 ft)
- Population (2023): 2,538
  - Density: 18.86/km^{2} (48.86/sq mi)
- Time zone: UTC+01:00 (CET)
  - Summer (DST): UTC+02:00 (CEST)
- INSEE/Postal code: 73187 /73260
- ^{1} French Land Register data, which excludes lakes, ponds, glaciers > 1 km^{2} (0.386 sq mi or 247 acres) and river estuaries.

La Léchère (French pronunciation: [la leʃɛʁ]) is a commune in the Savoie department in the Auvergne-Rhône-Alpes region in south-eastern France. It is situated in the Isère valley, between Albertville and Moûtiers. It was formed in 1972 by the merger of the former communes Notre-Dame-de-Briançon, Celliers, Doucy, Naves, Petit-Cœur and Pussy. On 1 January 2019, the former communes Bonneval and Feissons-sur-Isère were merged into La Léchère.

== Population ==
Population data refer to the area corresponding with the commune as of January 2025.

Historical population
Year	Pop.	±% p.a.
1968	3,339	—
1975	2,917	−1.91%
1982	2,642	−1.40%
1990	2,438	−1.00%
1999	2,382	−0.26%
2007	2,569	+0.95%
2012	2,574	+0.04%
2017	2,586	+0.09%
2023	2,538	−0.31%
Source: INSEE

== See also ==
- Communes of the Savoie department
