= Nippon Soda =

Japanese chemical company

Nippon Soda Co., Ltd.
- Native name: 日本曹達株式会社
- Company type: Public KK
- Traded as: TYO: 4041
- ISIN: JP3726200003
- Industry: Chemicals
- Founded: Jōetsu, Niigata (February 1, 1920; 105 years ago)
- Founder: Tomonori Nakano
- Headquarters: Ōtemachi, Chiyoda-ku, Tokyo 100-8165, Japan
- Area served: Worldwide
- Key people: Yutaka Kinebuchi (Chairman); Akira Ishii (President)
- Products: Industrial chemicals; Agrochemicals; Pharmaceuticals; Functional materials
- Services: Transportation and warehousing services; Plant construction; Civil engineering
- Revenue: ▼JPY 142.7 billion (FY 2015) (US$ 1.27 billion) (FY 2015)
- Net income: ▲JPY 14.3 billion (FY 2015) (US$ 127.7 million) (FY 2015)
- Number of employees: 2,702 (as of September 30, 2016)
- Website: Official website

Nippon Soda (日本曹達株式会社, Nihonsōda Kabushiki-kaisha) is a Japanese chemical company whose products include chemicals, agrochemicals and pharmaceuticals. Nippon Soda is a member of the Mizuho keiretsu.

== Subsidiaries ==
In 2012, Nippon Soda acquired 100% of MSSA Chemical Company (formerly known as Métaux Spéciaux), a French maker of sodium and related by-products with a factory in Saint-Marcel, Savoie, France.
