= Planay, Savoie =

Planay
- Commune
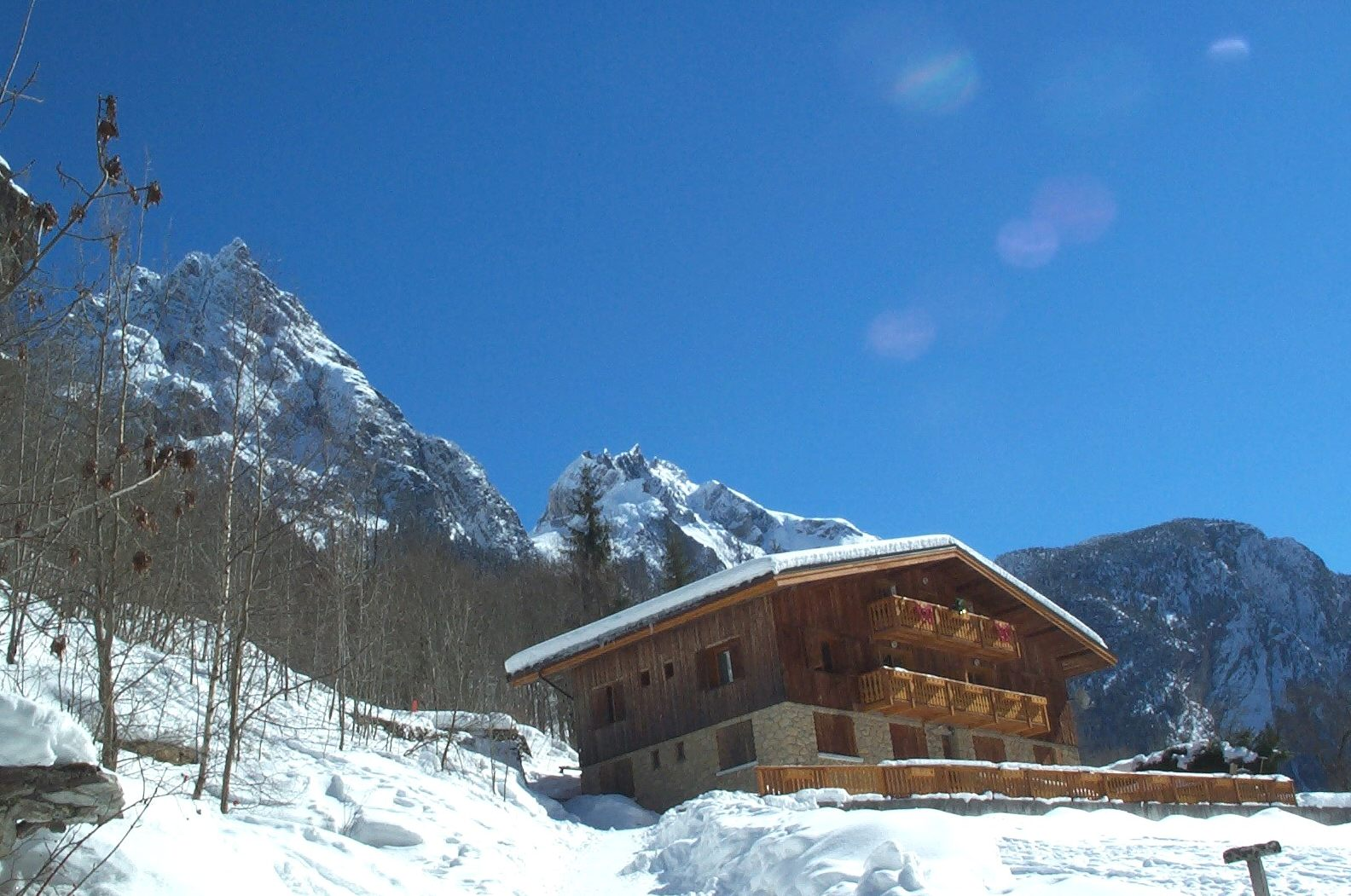
- A typical chalet in Planay
- Location of Planay
- Location within France Location within Auvergne-Rhône-Alpes
- Coordinates: 45°25′26″N 6°41′57″E
- Country: France
- Region: Auvergne-Rhône-Alpes
- Department: Savoie
- Arrondissement: Albertville
- Canton: Moûtiers

Government
  - Mayor (2020–2026): Jean-René Benoît
- Area^{1}: 22.41 km^{2} (8.65 sq mi)
- Highest elevation: 3,365 m (11,040 ft)
- Lowest elevation: 860 m (2,820 ft)
- Population (2023): 442
  - Density: 19.7/km^{2} (51.1/sq mi)
- Time zone: UTC+01:00 (CET)
  - Summer (DST): UTC+02:00 (CEST)
- INSEE/Postal code: 73201 /73350
- ^{1} French Land Register data, which excludes lakes, ponds, glaciers > 1 km^{2} (0.386 sq mi or 247 acres) and river estuaries.

Planay (French pronunciation: [planɛ]) is a commune in the Savoie department in the Auvergne-Rhône-Alpes region in south-eastern France.

== See also ==
- Communes of the Savoie department
