= Montagny, Savoie =

Montagny
- Commune
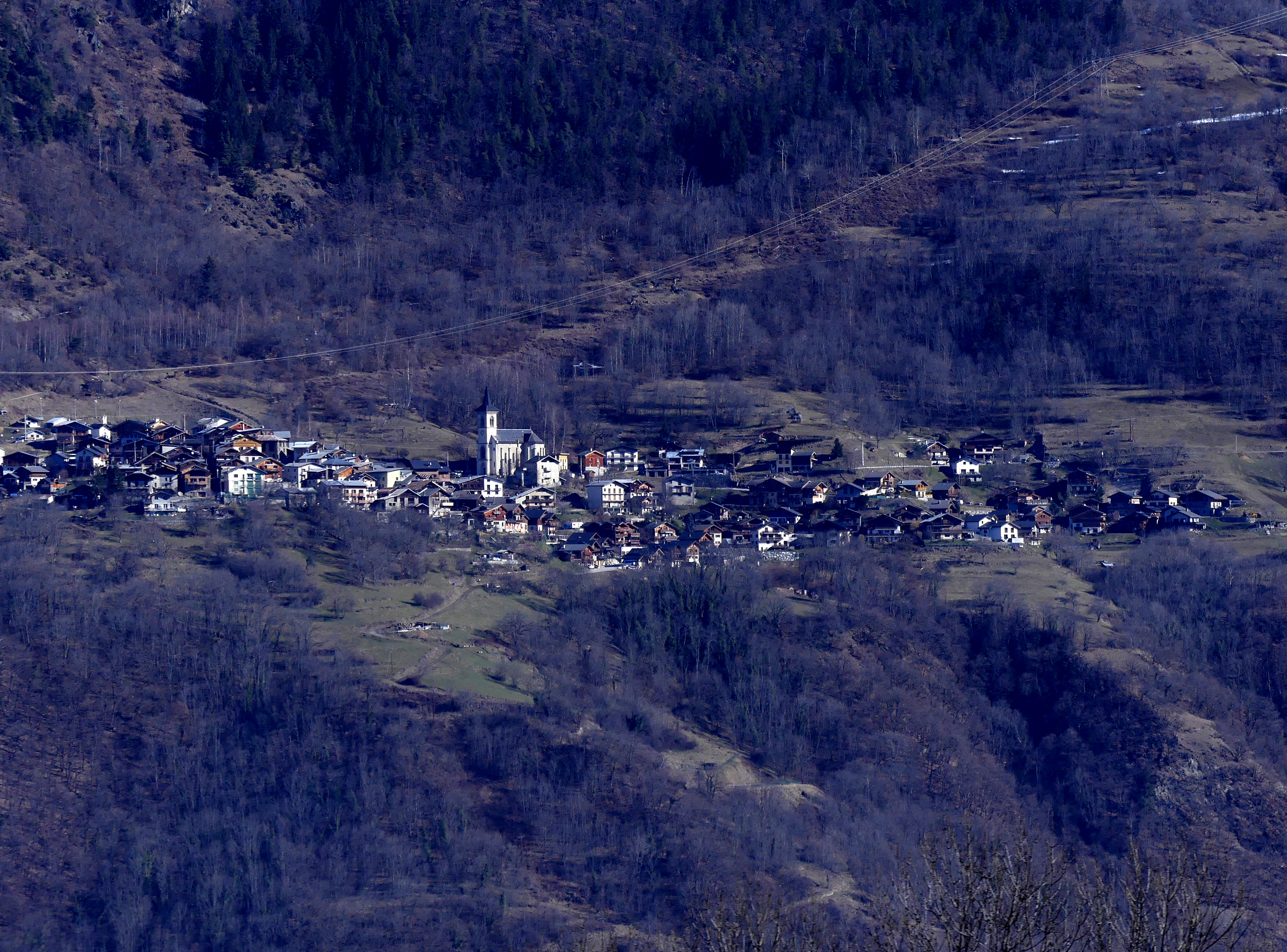
- View of Montagny from Les Allues
- Location of Montagny
- Location within France Location within Auvergne-Rhône-Alpes
- Coordinates: 45°27′25″N 6°35′33″E
- Country: France
- Region: Auvergne-Rhône-Alpes
- Department: Savoie
- Arrondissement: Albertville
- Canton: Moûtiers

Government
  - Mayor (2020–2026): Roland Dravet
- Area^{1}: 13.26 km^{2} (5.12 sq mi)
- Highest elevation: 2,444 m (8,018 ft)
- Lowest elevation: 657 m (2,156 ft)
- Population (2023): 658
  - Density: 49.6/km^{2} (129/sq mi)
- Time zone: UTC+01:00 (CET)
  - Summer (DST): UTC+02:00 (CEST)
- INSEE/Postal code: 73161 /73350
- Website: www.montagny-savoie.fr
- ^{1} French Land Register data, which excludes lakes, ponds, glaciers > 1 km^{2} (0.386 sq mi or 247 acres) and river estuaries.

Montagny (French pronunciation: [mɔ̃taɲi]; Arpitan: Montènyi) is a commune in the Savoie department in the Auvergne-Rhône-Alpes region in south-eastern France.

== See also ==
- Communes of the Savoie department
