= Notre-Dame-du-Pré =

- Commune
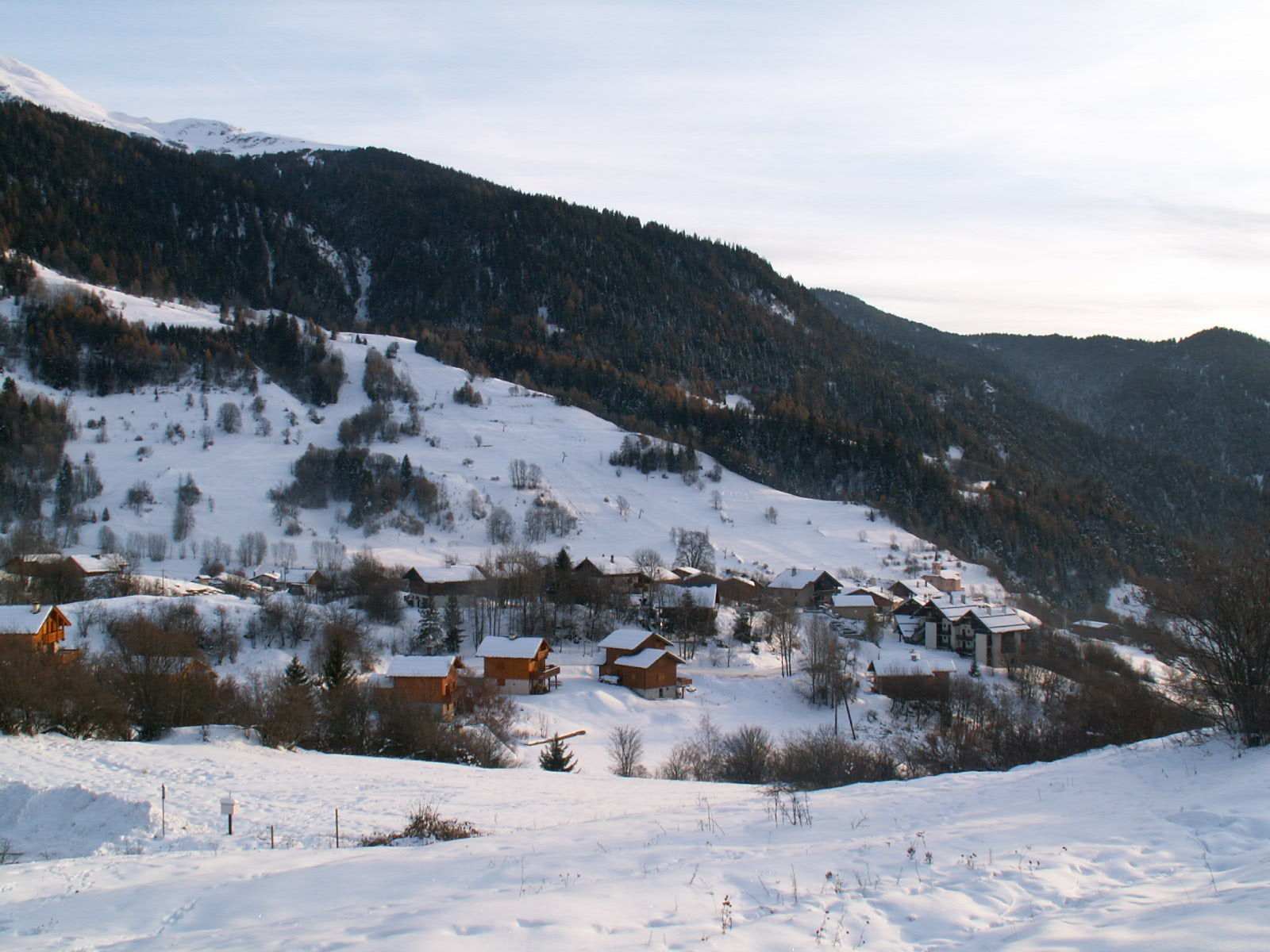
- A general view of Notre-Dame-du-Pré, in winter
- Location of Notre-Dame-du-Pré
- Location within France Location within Auvergne-Rhône-Alpes
- Coordinates: 45°30′46″N 6°35′39″E
- Country: France
- Region: Auvergne-Rhône-Alpes
- Department: Savoie
- Arrondissement: Albertville
- Canton: Moûtiers

Government
  - Mayor (2020–2026): Jocelyne Abondance Pourcel
- Area^{1}: 18.2 km^{2} (7.0 sq mi)
- Highest elevation: 2,556 m (8,386 ft)
- Lowest elevation: 536 m (1,759 ft)
- Population (2023): 258
  - Density: 14.2/km^{2} (36.7/sq mi)
- Time zone: UTC+01:00 (CET)
  - Summer (DST): UTC+02:00 (CEST)
- INSEE/Postal code: 73190 /73600
- ^{1} French Land Register data, which excludes lakes, ponds, glaciers > 1 km^{2} (0.386 sq mi or 247 acres) and river estuaries.

Notre-Dame-du-Pré (French pronunciation: [nɔtʁə dam dy pʁe]; Arpitan: Vlôprâ) is a commune in the Savoie department in the Auvergne-Rhône-Alpes region in south-eastern France.

== See also ==
- Communes of the Savoie department
