= Pussy, Savoie =

Pussy
- Part of La Léchère
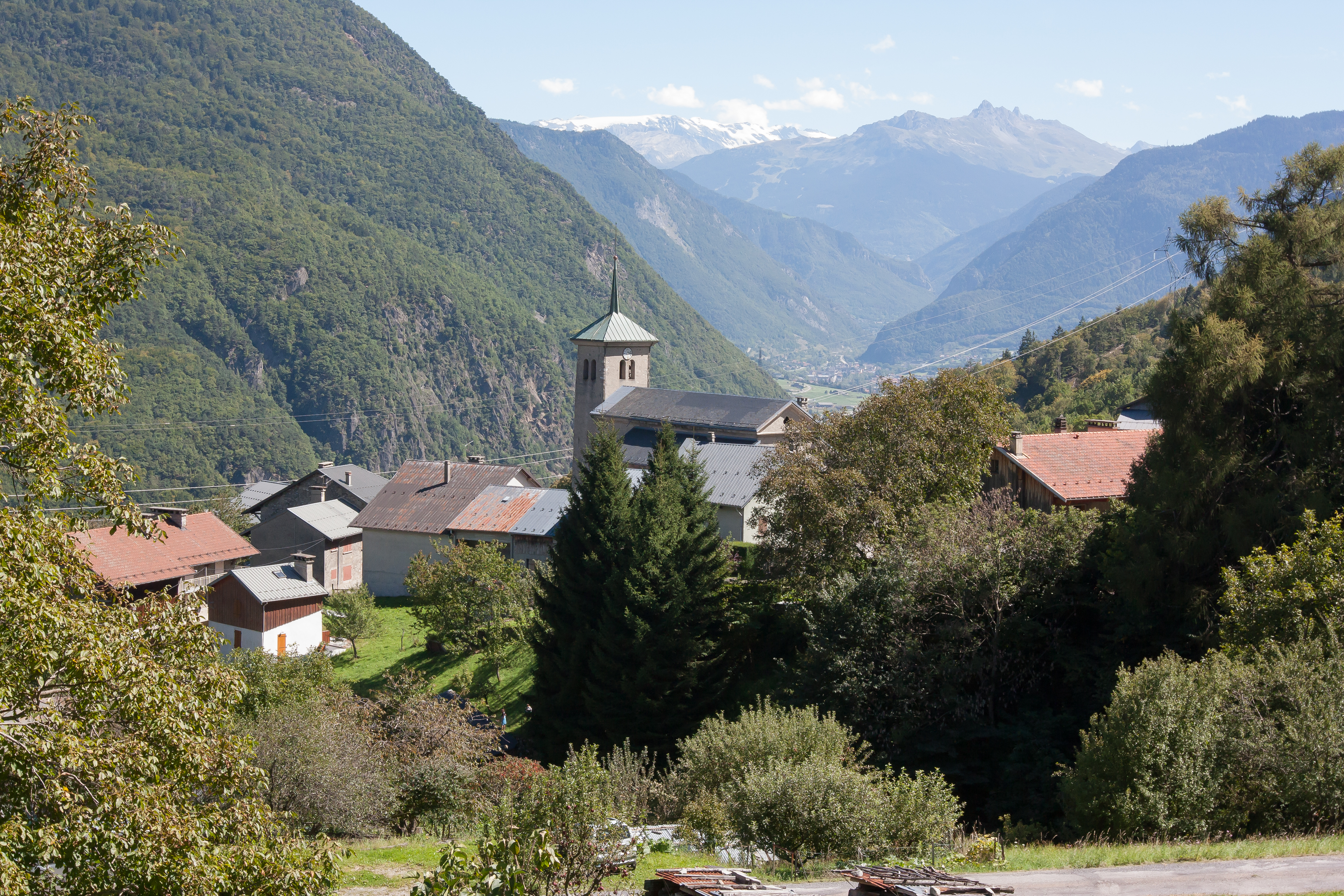
- Village center
- Location of Pussy
- Location within France Location within Auvergne-Rhône-Alpes
- Coordinates: 45°33′06″N 6°27′18″E
- Country: France
- Region: Auvergne-Rhône-Alpes
- Department: Savoie
- Arrondissement: Albertville
- Canton: Moûtiers
- Commune: La Léchère
- Area^{1}: 18 km^{2} (6.9 sq mi)
- Population (2022): 331
  - Density: 18/km^{2} (48/sq mi)
- Time zone: UTC+01:00 (CET)
  - Summer (DST): UTC+02:00 (CEST)
- Postal code: 73260
- ^{1} French Land Register data, which excludes lakes, ponds, glaciers > 1 km^{2} (0.386 sq mi or 247 acres) and river estuaries.

Pussy (French pronunciation: [pysi]) is a small village and a delegated commune of La Léchère in the Savoie département of France. It is situated on the eastern slope of Mont Bellachat above the left bank of the Isère, 9 km (5.5 mi.) northwest of Moûtiers. The name derives from the Roman personal name Pussius, which refers to the owner of the place in the Roman era.

The village boundary covers 18 km^{2} (6.8 mile²). The local church, dedicated to Saint John the Baptist, was rebuilt in 1669. In 1561 the population was recorded as 1455 people, 548 in 1776, and 276 in 1979. Pussy and several other small villages were merged into the new commune of La Léchère for administrative purposes in 1972.

== See also ==
- Place names considered unusual
