= Fontaine-le-Puits =

Fontaine-le-Puits Fontâne (Arpitan)
- Part of Salins-Fontaine
- Location of Fontaine-le-Puits
- Location within France Location within Auvergne-Rhône-Alpes
- Coordinates: 45°27′29″N 6°30′28″E
- Country: France
- Region: Auvergne-Rhône-Alpes
- Department: Savoie
- Arrondissement: Albertville
- Canton: Moûtiers
- Commune: Salins-Fontaine
- Area^{1}: 4.47 km^{2} (1.73 sq mi)
- Highest elevation: 1,672 m (5,486 ft)
- Lowest elevation: 536 m (1,759 ft)
- Population (2022): 102
  - Density: 22.8/km^{2} (59.1/sq mi)
- Time zone: UTC+01:00 (CET)
  - Summer (DST): UTC+02:00 (CEST)
- Postal code: 73600
- ^{1} French Land Register data, which excludes lakes, ponds, glaciers > 1 km^{2} (0.386 sq mi or 247 acres) and river estuaries.

Fontaine-le-Puits (French pronunciation: [fɔ̃tɛn lə pɥi]; Arpitan: Fontâne) is a former commune in the Savoie department in the Auvergne-Rhône-Alpes region in south-eastern France. On 1 January 2016, it was merged into the new commune of Salins-Fontaine.

== See also ==
- Communes of the Savoie department
