= Gaudo culture =

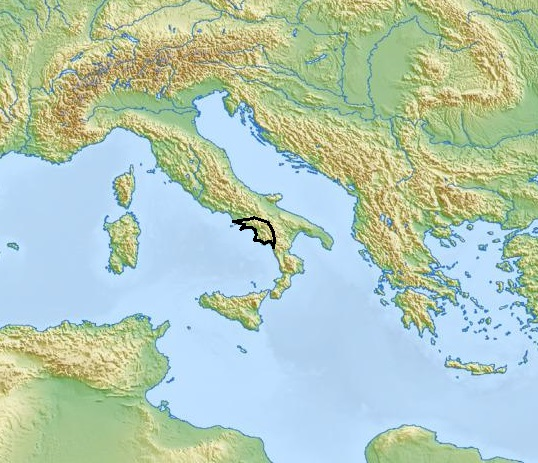
- Horizon: Chalcolithic
- Geographical range: Southern Italy
- Period: 3150-2300 BC
- Type site: Spina-Gaudo necropolis
- Preceded by: Neolithic Italy
- Followed by: Bell Beaker culture

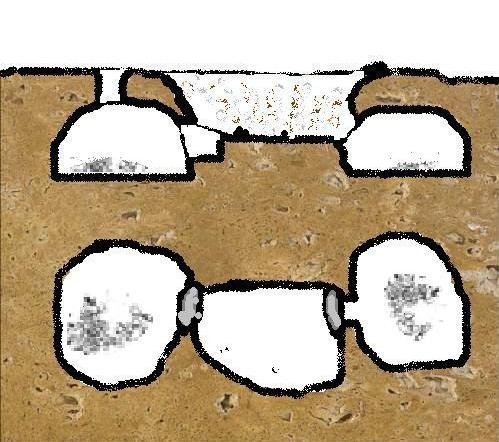
An example of a Gaudo Culture tomb, made up of an access shaft with antechamber, from which branch off two burial chambers, containing ceremonial ceramics like the one pictured above, and human skeletons bound up in the fetal position.

The Gaudo Culture is an Eneolithic culture from Southern Italy, primarily in the region of Campania, active at the end of the 4th millennium BC, whose typesite necropolis is located near Paestum, not far from the mouth of the river Sele. Its name comes from the Spina-Gaudo necropolis.

Objects of this culture are known and have been recovered since Antiquity. During the 5th century BC and/or the 4th century BC, for example, Greek settlers deposited daggers made of flint probably from graves in an ancient sanctuary at the site of Paestum. In the 18th century, objects were also recovered by scholars. For example, a flint dagger and a vase were brought from Italy to England by William Hamilton and are now in the British Museum.

== The Necropolis ==
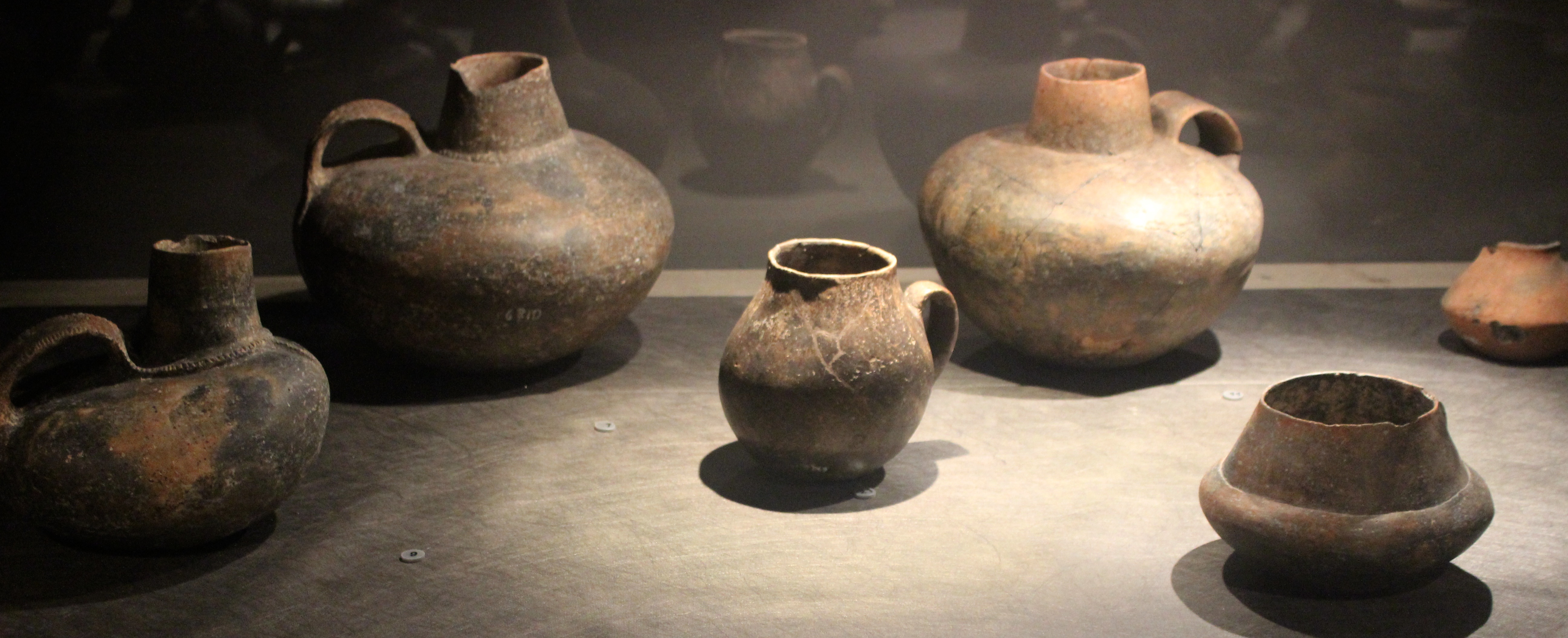
Gaudo pottery

Though there are some earlier paleolithic findings at the Gaudo site, about one kilometer from more famous Greco-Roman ruins at Paestum, the Gaudo culture is associated primarily with the better established neolithic necropolis. This necropolis occupies about 2000 m^{2} and contains 34 separate tombs. It was discovered late in the year 1943, during the Allied campaign in Italy, when the construction of the Gaudo Airfield unearthed some of the tombs. A British officer and archeologist, Lieutenant John G. S. Brinson, proceeded to conduct a scientific excavation of the tombs and recorded his findings in a notebook now held in the National Archeological Museum of Naples.

Each tomb is roughly hewn out of rock in an "oven-shaped" design, with either one or two burial chambers of a somewhat oval shape, with a low, curved ceiling, each containing multiple human skeletons in the fetal position, either on their sides or on their backs. The tombs were accessed by a more or less circular shaft from above, at the bottom of which was a kind of vestibule or antechamber. There is evidence that the Gaudo funeral rites would have been carried out by a team of people, and after the conclusion of the rites, the tomb would have to be sealed off by a large stone. The Gaudo people would apparently use tombs repeatedly, perhaps for different generations of people. It has been seen that the body of the most recently deceased would always be placed at the back of his burial chamber, with the previous tenants of that chamber placed beside him. The corpses would be accompanied by fine ceremonial ceramic pots in various forms, such as the "askoi", the curious double "salt cellar", as well as weapons: arrowheads, spearheads, and knives of flint or copper. These accessories were probably symbols of rank. Study of the arrangement of bones and accompanying artifacts has led researchers to believe that the Gaudo society was structured into different family groups or warrior clans of some kind. It is curious that in the access shafts and antechamber of the Gaudo tombs, pottery was also found, but this was of a much coarser grade, a simpler form, larger dimensions, and was sparsely decorated.

Unfortunately, since the Gaudo people are known almost exclusively through their tombs, little is known about the many other facets of their culture, which may have been equally fascinating. Some other Gaudo sites are known throughout Campania however, such as what is thought to be a Gaudo dwelling in Taurasi, and the necropoles at Eboli and Buccino.

A large collection of Gaudo artifacts is on display at the National Archeological Museum of Paestum.

== Gallery ==
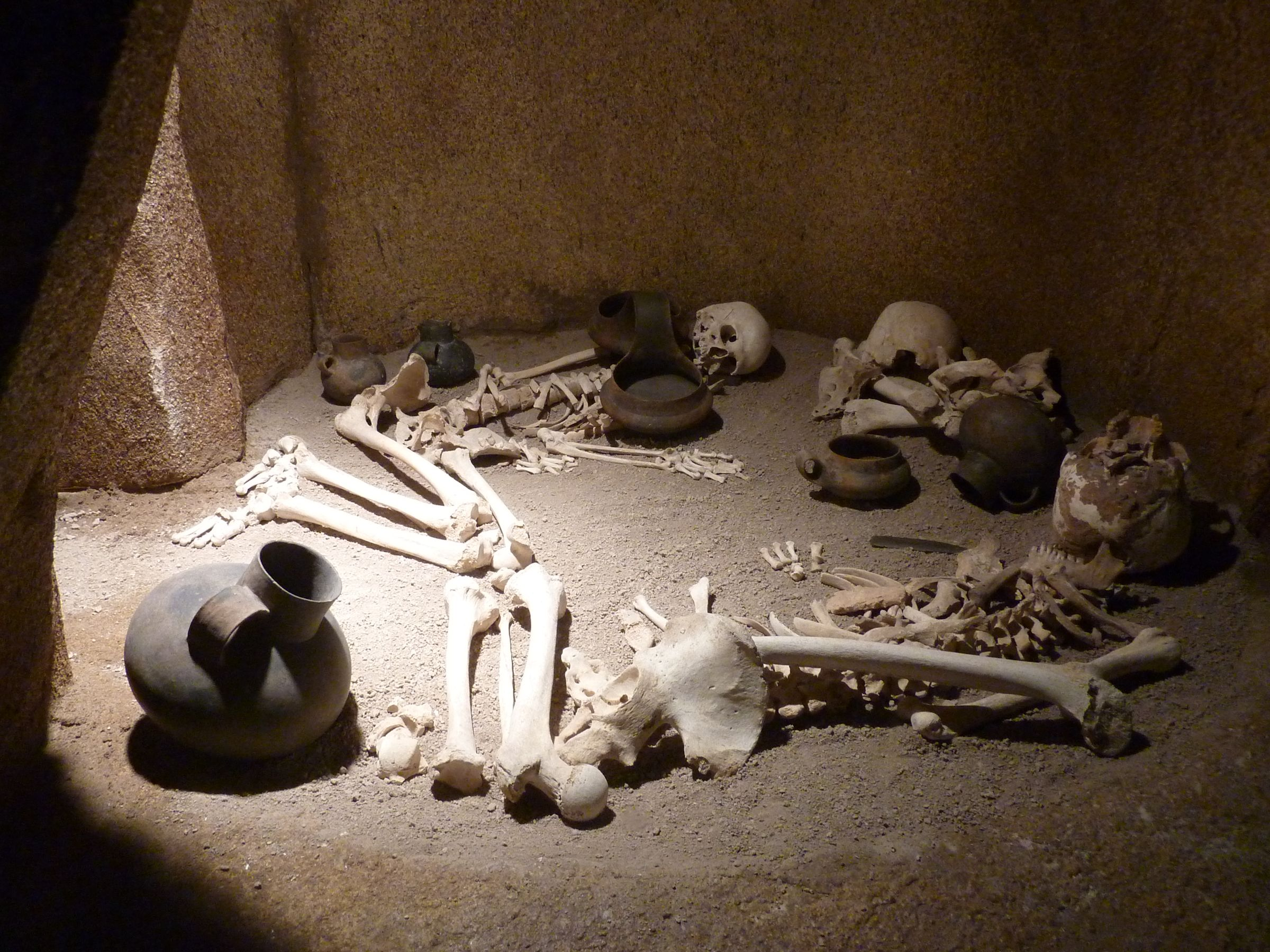
Grave

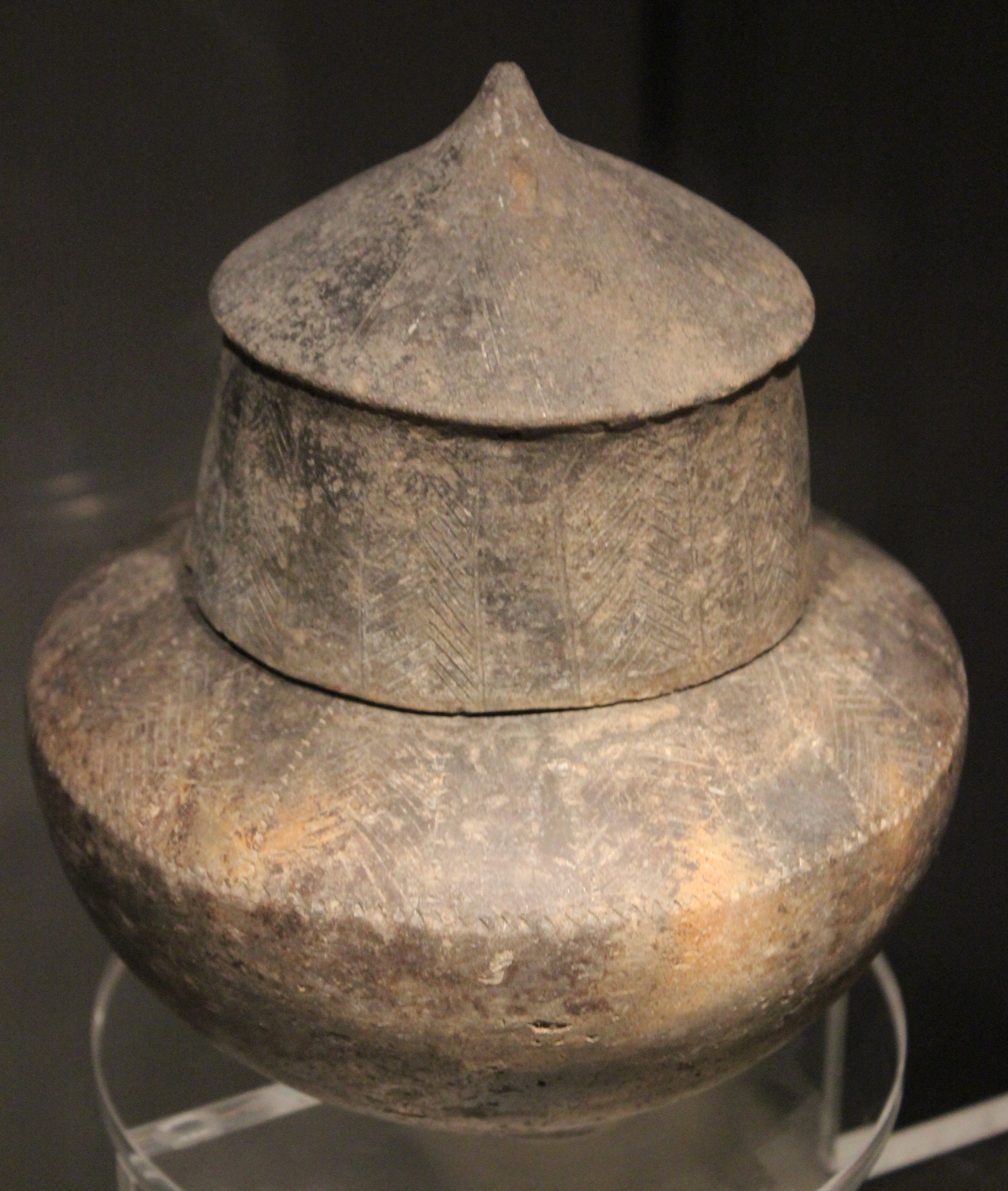

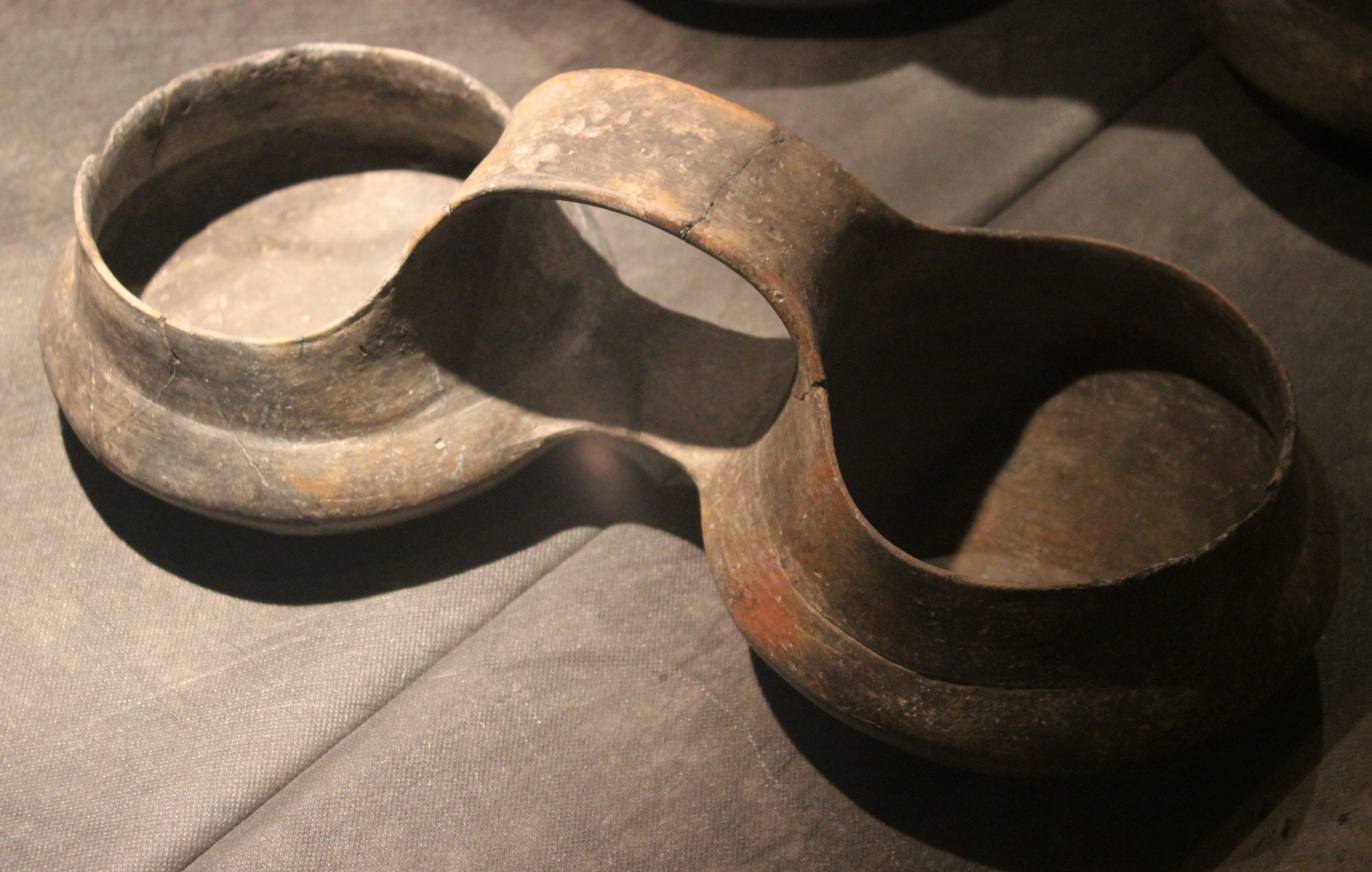

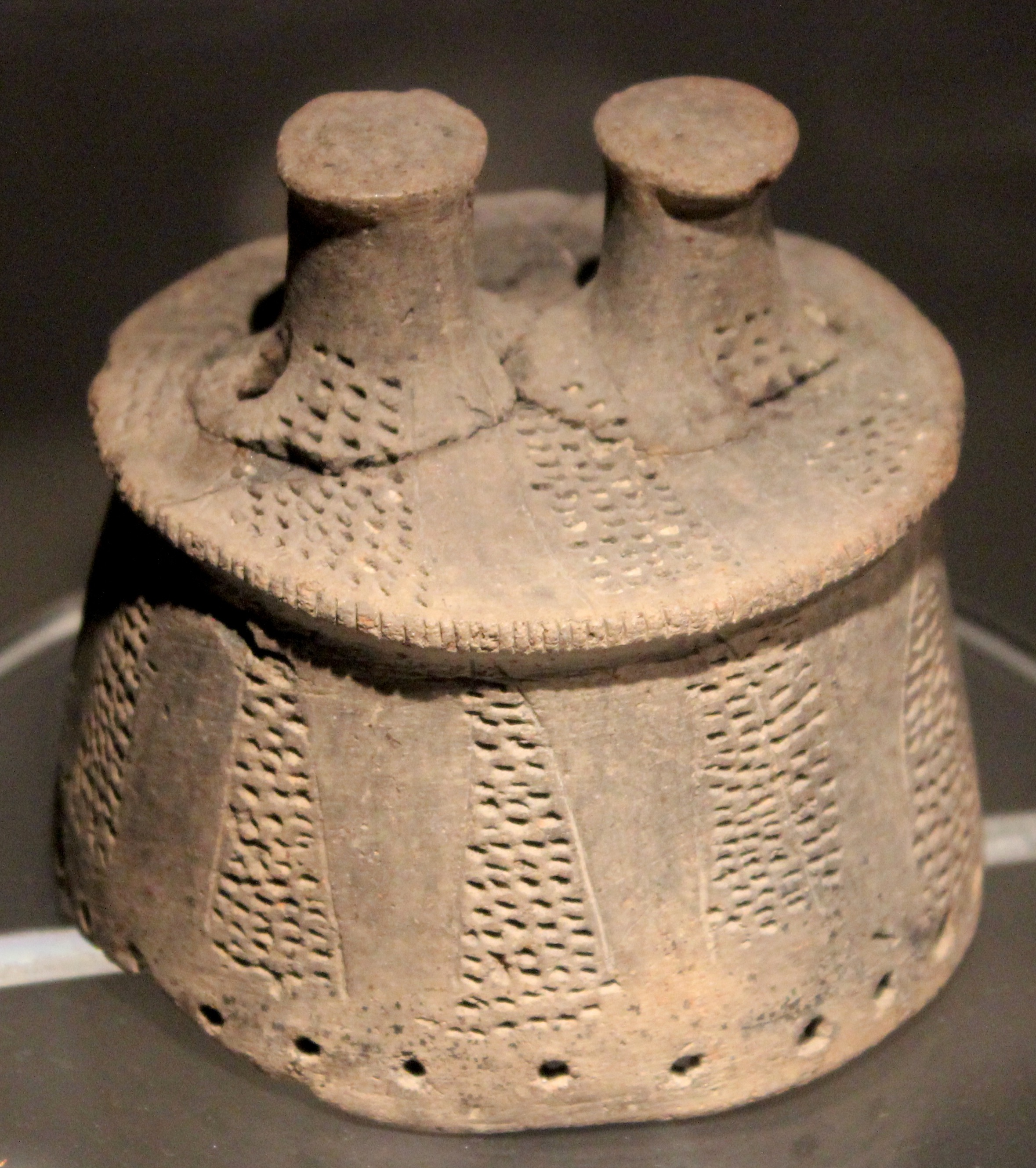

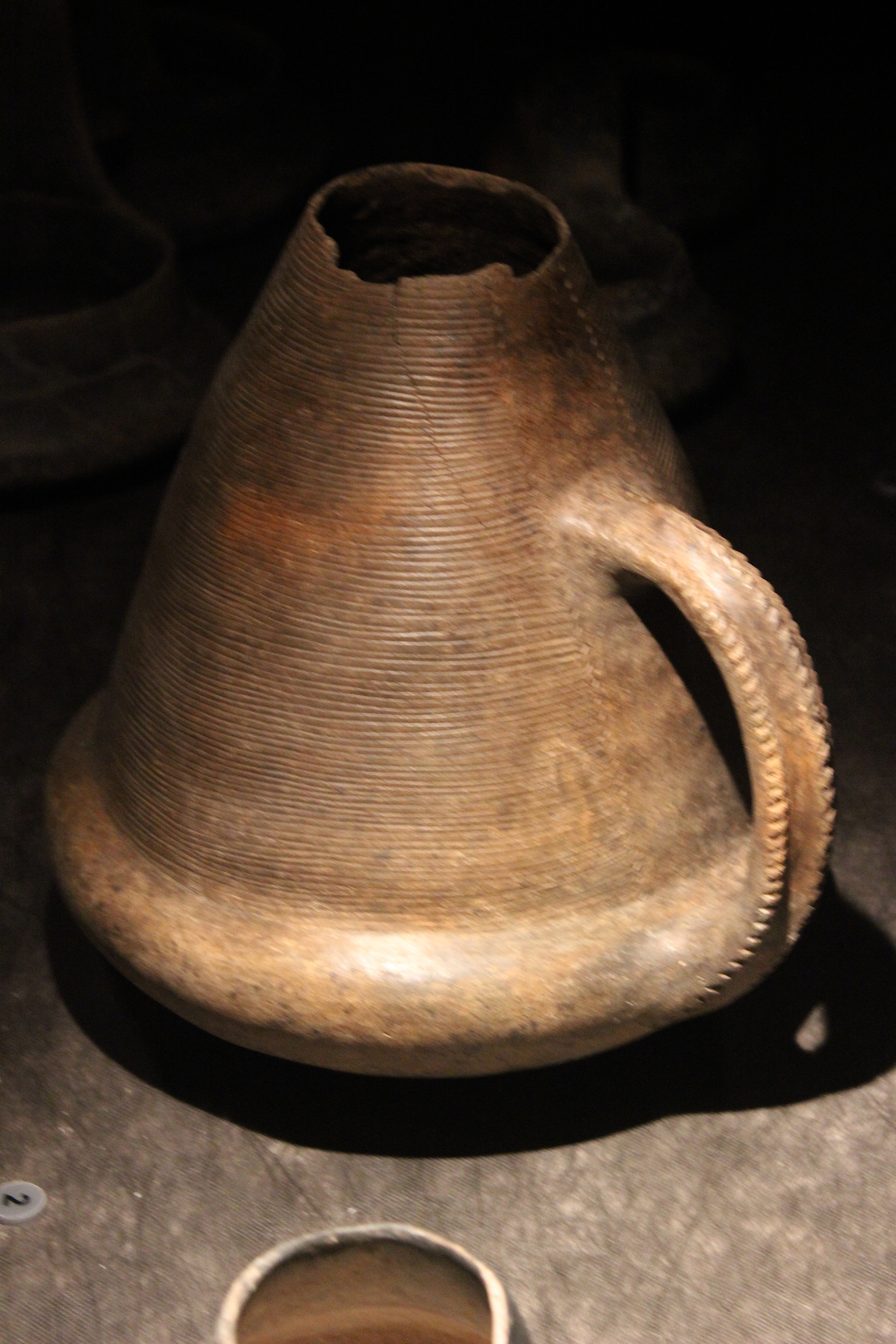

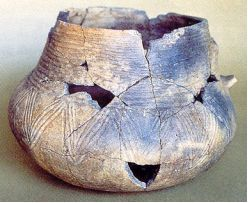

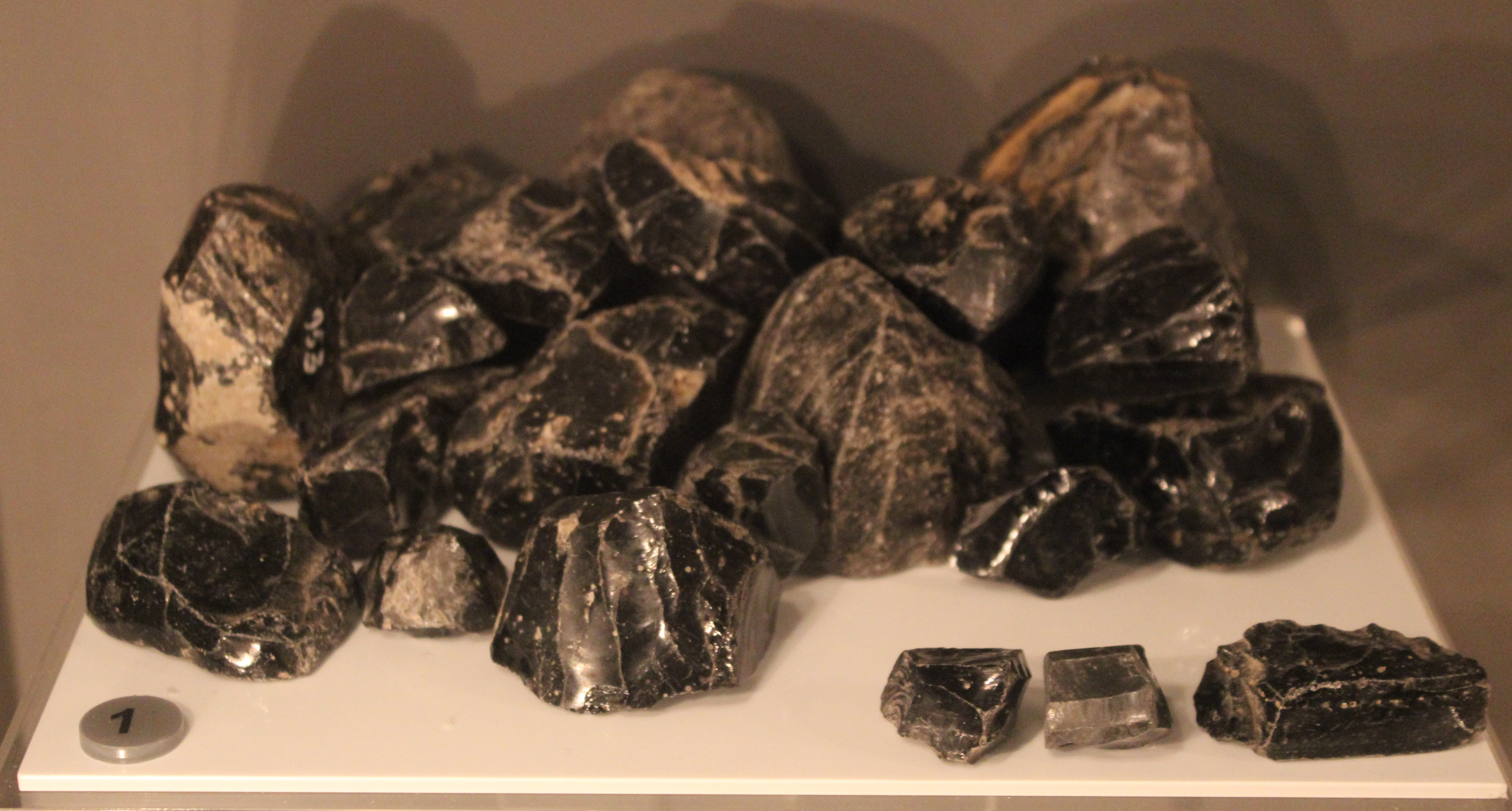

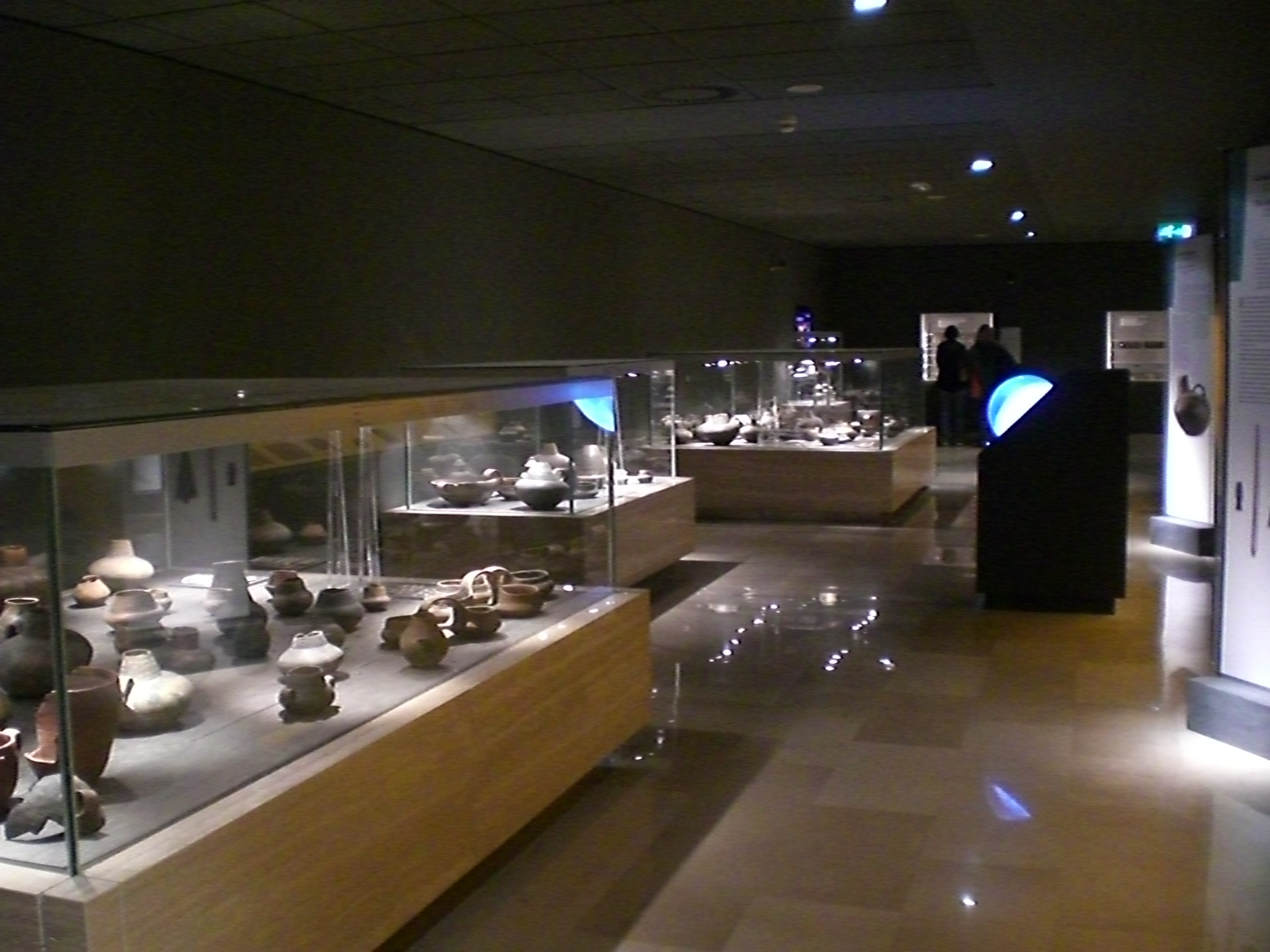

== Genetics ==
Antonio et al. (2019) analyzed the remains of a male from a Eneolithic site in southern Lazio at foothill of Monti Ausoni, belonging to both Rinaldone and Gaudo culture; he was buried in Monte San Biagio, Italy, between ca. 3500 BC and 2500 BC. He carried the paternal haplogroup H2 (P96), also found in Neolithic Anatolia and in multiple later Neolithic cultures of Europe, while he carried the maternal haplogroup N1a1a1a3, found in many Neolithic cultures of Europe. His autosomal DNA was a mixture of EEF ancestry (85%) and WHG ancestry (15%), similar to other Copper Age samples from Italy and the rest of Europe, including those from the Remedello culture.

== See also ==
- Prehistoric Italy
- Laterza culture
