= Saint-Marcel, Savoie =

Saint-Marcel
- Commune
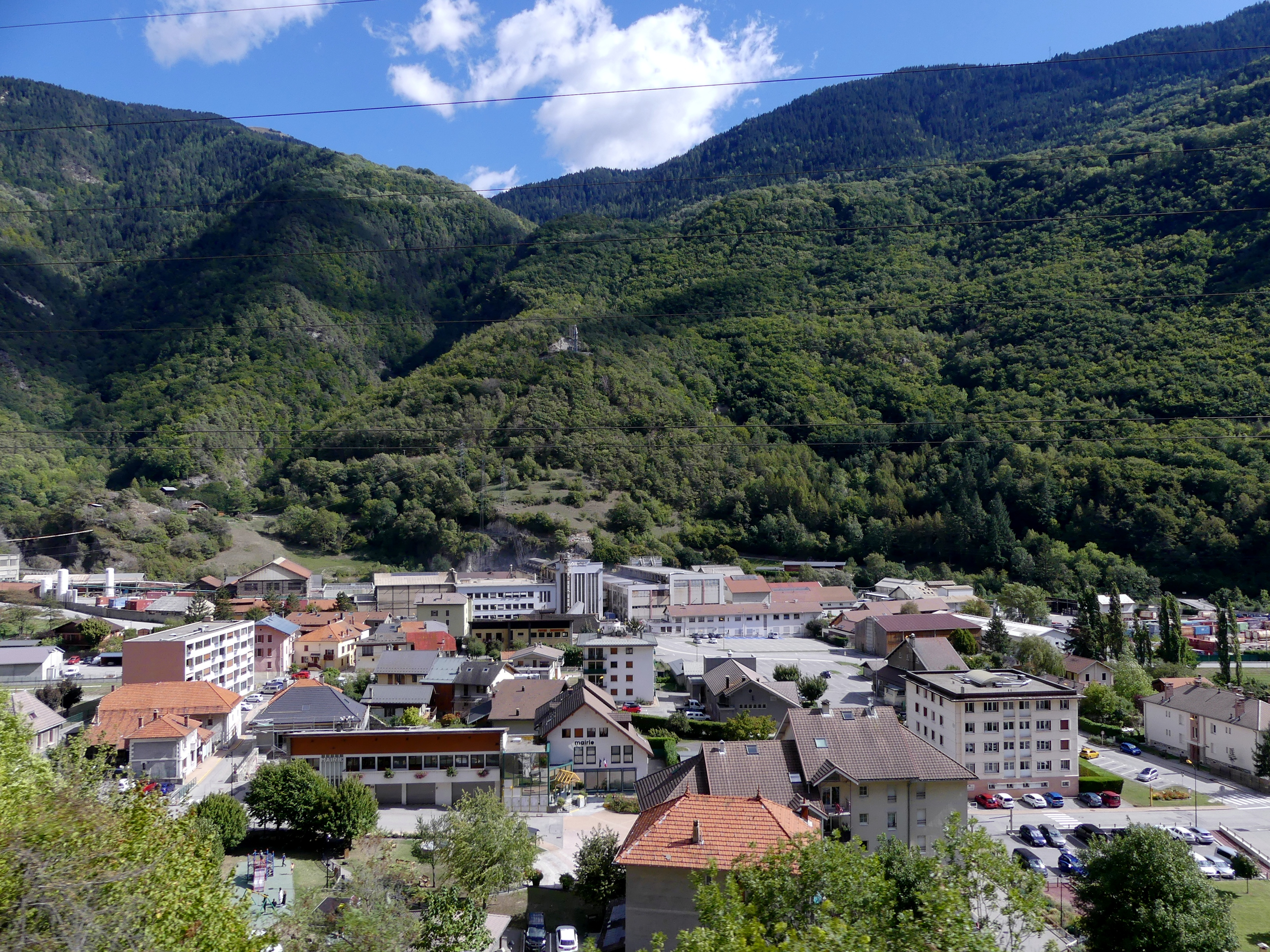

- Coat of arms
- Location of Saint-Marcel
- Location within France Location within Auvergne-Rhône-Alpes
- Coordinates: 45°29′56″N 6°33′36″E
- Country: France
- Region: Auvergne-Rhône-Alpes
- Department: Savoie
- Arrondissement: Albertville
- Canton: Moûtiers

Government
  - Mayor (2020–2026): Daniel Charrière
- Area^{1}: 8.76 km^{2} (3.38 sq mi)
- Highest elevation: 1,600 m (5,200 ft)
- Lowest elevation: 495 m (1,624 ft)
- Population (2023): 611
  - Density: 69.7/km^{2} (181/sq mi)
- Time zone: UTC+01:00 (CET)
  - Summer (DST): UTC+02:00 (CEST)
- INSEE/Postal code: 73253 /73600
- ^{1} French Land Register data, which excludes lakes, ponds, glaciers > 1 km^{2} (0.386 sq mi or 247 acres) and river estuaries.

Saint-Marcel (French pronunciation: [sɛ̃ maʁsɛl]; Arpitan: Sent Marcél) is a commune in the Savoie department in the Auvergne-Rhône-Alpes region in south-eastern France. It is home to the MSSA Chemical company sodium factory.

== See also ==
- Communes of the Savoie department
