= Hautecour, Savoie =

Hautecour
- Commune
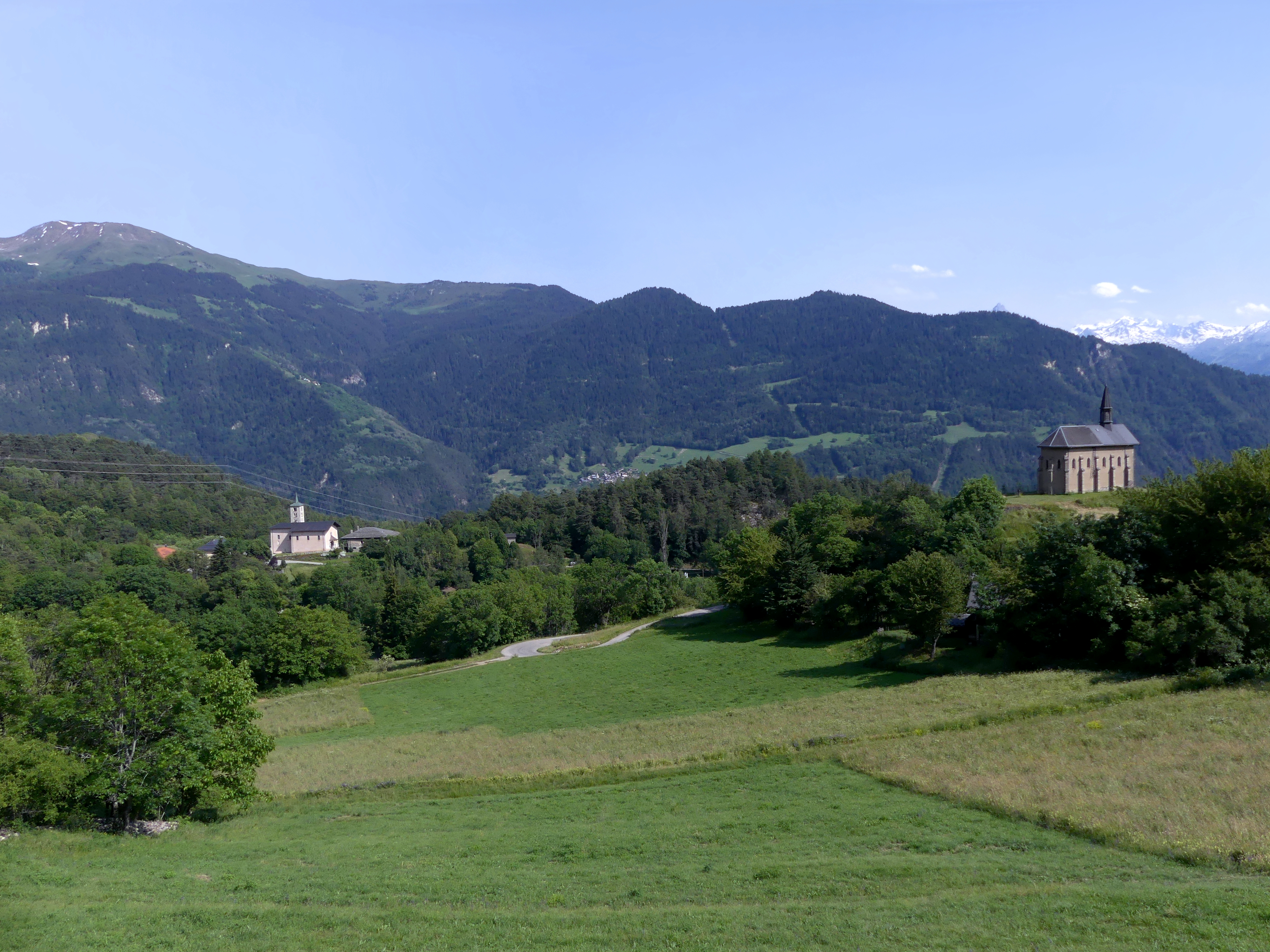
- A general view of Hautecour
- Location of Hautecour
- Location within France Location within Auvergne-Rhône-Alpes
- Coordinates: 45°30′31″N 6°32′52″E
- Country: France
- Region: Auvergne-Rhône-Alpes
- Department: Savoie
- Arrondissement: Albertville
- Canton: Moûtiers

Government
  - Mayor (2020–2026): Annie Leduc
- Area^{1}: 11.65 km^{2} (4.50 sq mi)
- Highest elevation: 2,282 m (7,487 ft)
- Lowest elevation: 599 m (1,965 ft)
- Population (2023): 298
  - Density: 25.6/km^{2} (66.3/sq mi)
- Time zone: UTC+01:00 (CET)
  - Summer (DST): UTC+02:00 (CEST)
- INSEE/Postal code: 73131 /73600
- ^{1} French Land Register data, which excludes lakes, ponds, glaciers > 1 km^{2} (0.386 sq mi or 247 acres) and river estuaries.

Hautecour (French pronunciation: [otkuʁ]) is a commune in the Savoie department in the Auvergne-Rhône-Alpes region in south-eastern France.

Hautecour used to be full of farms but in the 70s most were abandoned.

== See also ==
- Communes of the Savoie department
