= Canton of Moûtiers =

Coordinates: 45.49°N 6.53°E

The canton of Moûtiers is an administrative division of the Savoie department, southeastern France. Its borders were modified at the French canton reorganisation which came into effect in March 2015. Its seat is in Moûtiers.

It consists of the following communes:

1. Les Allues
2. Les Avanchers-Valmorel
3. Les Belleville
4. Bozel
5. Brides-les-Bains
6. Champagny-en-Vanoise
7. Courchevel
8. Feissons-sur-Salins
9. Grand-Aigueblanche
10. Hautecour
11. La Léchère
12. Montagny
13. Moûtiers
14. Notre-Dame-du-Pré
15. Planay
16. Pralognan-la-Vanoise
17. Saint-Marcel
18. Salins-Fontaine
