= Albertville =

Subprefecture of Savoie, Auvergne-Rhône-Alpes, France

Albertville Arbèrtvile (Arpitan)
- Subprefecture and commune
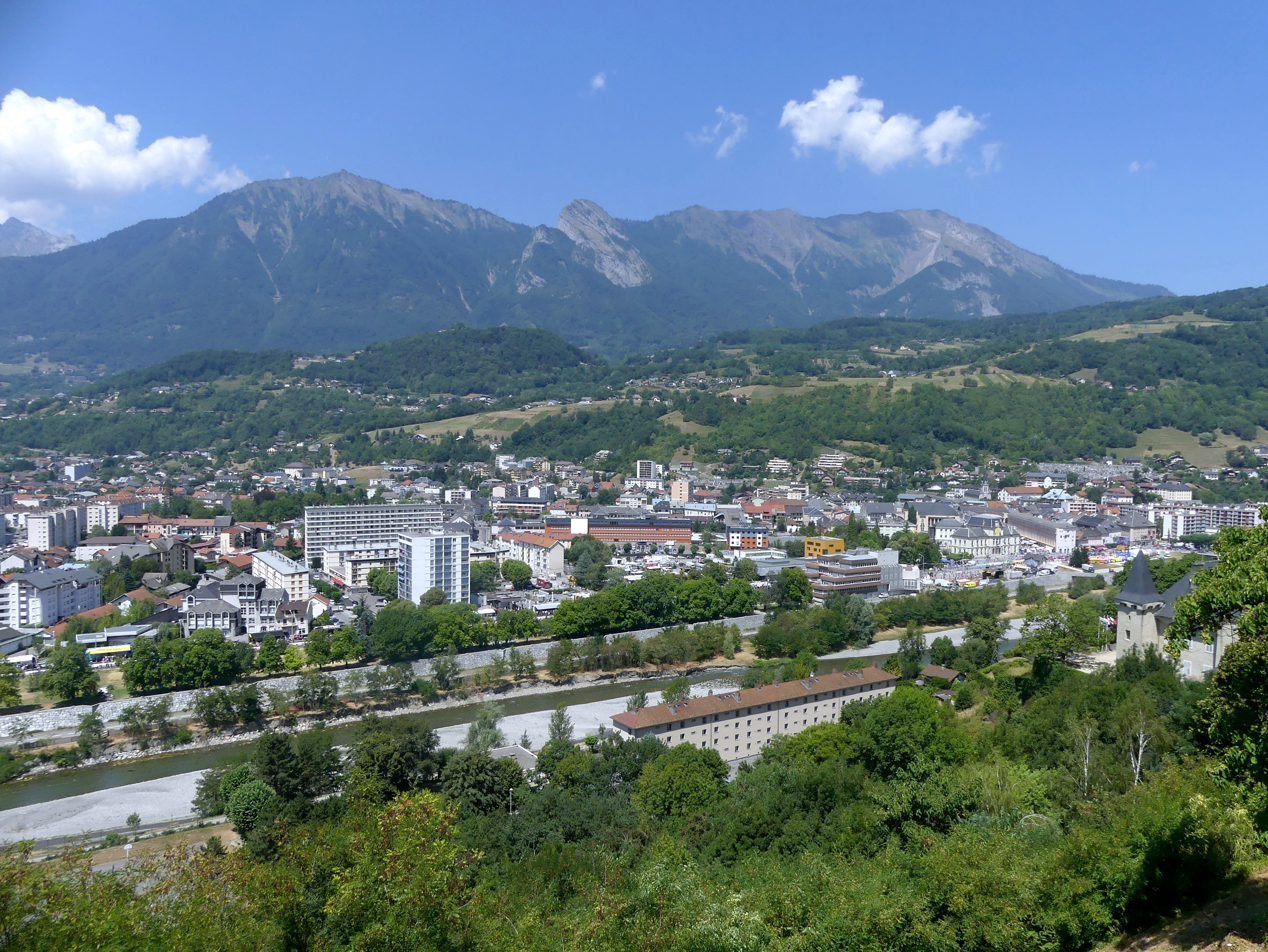
- A general view of Albertville

- Coat of arms
- Location of Albertville
- Location within France Location within Auvergne-Rhône-Alpes
- Coordinates: 45°40′36″N 6°23′36″E
- Country: France
- Region: Auvergne-Rhône-Alpes
- Department: Savoie
- Arrondissement: Albertville
- Canton: Albertville-1; Albertville-2
- Intercommunality: CA Arlysère

Government
  - Mayor (2020–2026): Frédéric Burnier-Framboret
- Area^{1}: 17.54 km^{2} (6.77 sq mi)
  - Urban: 163.6 km^{2} (63.2 sq mi)
- Elevation: 352 m (1,155 ft)
- Highest elevation: 2,030 m (6,660 ft)
- Lowest elevation: 328 m (1,076 ft)
- Population (2023): 19,978
  - Density: 1,139/km^{2} (2,950/sq mi)
  - Urban (2022): 40,715
  - Urban density: 248.9/km^{2} (644.6/sq mi)
- Time zone: UTC+01:00 (CET)
  - Summer (DST): UTC+02:00 (CEST)
- INSEE/Postal code: 73011 /73200
- Website: www.albertville.fr
- ^{1} French Land Register data, which excludes lakes, ponds, glaciers > 1 km^{2} (0.386 sq mi or 247 acres) and river estuaries.

Albertville (French pronunciation: [albɛʁvil]; Arpitan: Arbèrtvile) is a subprefecture of the Savoie department in the Auvergne-Rhône-Alpes region in southeastern France. It is best known for hosting the 1992 Winter Olympics and Paralympics. In 2022, the commune had a population of 19,706; its urban area had 40,715 inhabitants.

== Geography ==
Albertville is one of two subprefectures of the Savoie department, alongside Saint-Jean-de-Maurienne.

Albertville is situated on the river Arly, close to the confluence with the river Isère. Its altitude ranges from 345 to 2,037 metres (1,132 to 6,683 ft). Nearby mountains include: Belle Étoile, Dent de Cons, Négresse, Roche Pourrie, Mirantin, Pointe de la Grande Journée, Chaîne du Grand Arc. Nearby mountain ranges include the Bauges, the Beaufortain and the beginning of the Vanoise.

== History ==
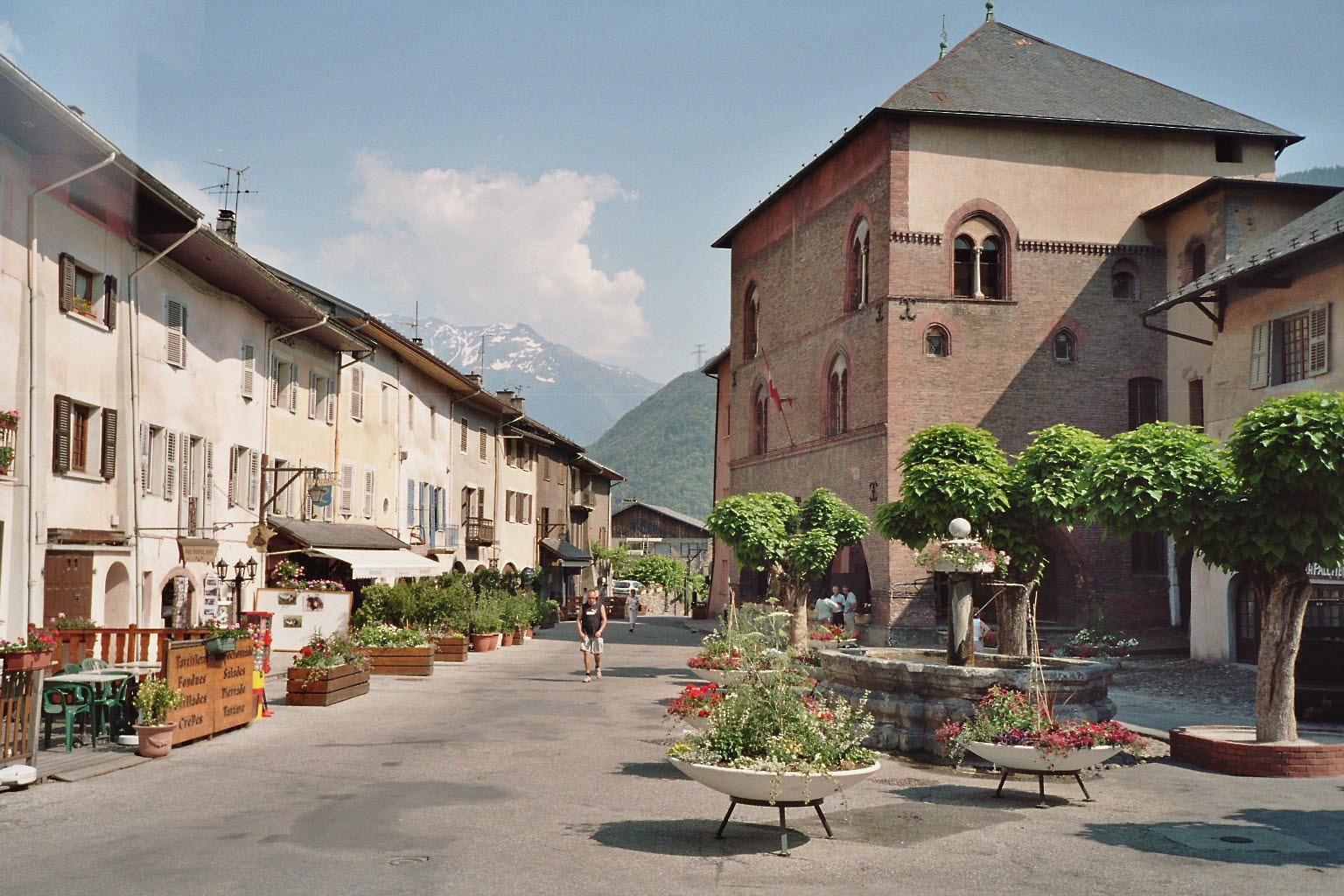
Medieval town of Conflans, Albertville

The modern city of Albertville was formed in 1836 by King Charles Albert of Sardinia, who merged the medieval town of Conflans, which had buildings dating to the 14th century, with the town of L'Hôpital. Since then, Albertville has fostered trade between France, Italy and Switzerland. Industries such as paper mills and hydroelectricity are found along its river.

The 1992 Winter Olympics were organised in the Savoie region, with Albertville hosting it. Some of the sports venues were later adapted for other uses. Some sports venues still remain, such as the ice rink, La halle de glace Olympique, designed by the architect Jacques Kalisz. Despite this, the town remains more industrial than touristic.

In 2003, the town was labelled a "Town of Art and History".

== Population ==
Historical population
Year	Pop.	±% p.a.
1968	15,739	—
1975	16,961	+1.07%
1982	16,970	+0.01%
1990	17,411	+0.32%
1999	17,340	−0.05%
2007	17,814	+0.34%
2012	19,271	+1.58%
2017	18,899	−0.39%
2023	19,978	+0.93%
Source: INSEE

== Transport ==
Albertville station was put into service in 1879 by the Compagnie des chemins de fer de Paris à Lyon et à la Méditerranée (PLM).

== Notable people ==
- Alex Baudin, (born 2001), professional cyclist
- Justine Braisaz (born 1996), Olympic champion and world medalist in biathlon
- Jean-Luc Crétier (born 1966), Olympic champion in alpine skiing (WOC 1998, downhill)
- Florine De Leymarie (born 1981), skier
- Jérôme Jarre (born 1990), comedian on the Vine app and humanitarian.
- Léa Lemare (born 1996), ski jumper and national champion
- Lucette Mazzella (1910–1987) teacher, communist organizer and women's rights activist
- Gérard Mourou (born 1944), Nobel Prize winner in Physics, 2018
- Julia Simon (biathlete) (born 1996), world champion in biathlon

== Sites of interest ==
- La halle de glace Olympique, or the Olympic ice hall, the ice arena that hosted events during the 1992 Winter Olympics.
- L'anneau de vitesse, or speed oval, the athletic stadium that previously served as the site of the speed skating competitions of 1992 Winter Olympics.

== International relations ==
Albertville is twinned with:

- Aosta, Italy
- Winnenden, Baden-Württemberg, Germany
- Sainte-Adèle, Quebec, Canada
- Vancouver, British Columbia, Canada, which like Albertville, hosted a Winter Olympics, doing so in 2010

== Heraldry ==
Heraldry of Albertville

== Climate ==
Climate data for Albertville/Gilly-sur-Isère, elevation 330 m (1,080 ft), (1991−2020 normals, extremes 1982−2020)
Month	Jan	Feb	Mar	Apr	May	Jun	Jul	Aug	Sep	Oct	Nov	Dec	Year
Record high °C (°F)	16.9 (62.4)	23.0 (73.4)	26.2 (79.2)	29.6 (85.3)	31.1 (88.0)	36.0 (96.8)	38.3 (100.9)	39.0 (102.2)	33.2 (91.8)	29.8 (85.6)	23.3 (73.9)	19.6 (67.3)	39.0 (102.2)
Mean daily maximum °C (°F)	6.3 (43.3)	8.8 (47.8)	14.1 (57.4)	18.0 (64.4)	21.8 (71.2)	25.4 (77.7)	27.5 (81.5)	27.1 (80.8)	22.7 (72.9)	17.7 (63.9)	10.9 (51.6)	6.5 (43.7)	17.2 (63.0)
Daily mean °C (°F)	1.7 (35.1)	3.3 (37.9)	7.8 (46.0)	11.3 (52.3)	15.3 (59.5)	18.9 (66.0)	20.7 (69.3)	20.5 (68.9)	16.4 (61.5)	12.0 (53.6)	6.1 (43.0)	2.3 (36.1)	11.4 (52.5)
Mean daily minimum °C (°F)	−2.8 (27.0)	−2.1 (28.2)	1.5 (34.7)	4.5 (40.1)	8.7 (47.7)	12.3 (54.1)	14.0 (57.2)	13.8 (56.8)	10.2 (50.4)	6.2 (43.2)	1.2 (34.2)	−1.9 (28.6)	5.5 (41.9)
Record low °C (°F)	−24.0 (−11.2)	−19.0 (−2.2)	−10.5 (13.1)	−4.3 (24.3)	−1.4 (29.5)	0.8 (33.4)	4.9 (40.8)	3.4 (38.1)	−1.4 (29.5)	−6.0 (21.2)	−15.0 (5.0)	−16.0 (3.2)	−24.0 (−11.2)
Average precipitation mm (inches)	135.9 (5.35)	105.8 (4.17)	108.0 (4.25)	92.7 (3.65)	109.1 (4.30)	104.8 (4.13)	100.3 (3.95)	107.5 (4.23)	97.3 (3.83)	109.0 (4.29)	125.5 (4.94)	157.8 (6.21)	1,353.7 (53.30)
Average precipitation days (≥ 1.0 mm)	10.2	8.5	9.6	9.1	11.8	10.6	9.5	9.4	9.1	10.3	10.4	11.1	119.8
Source: Météo-France

== See also ==
- Communes of the Savoie department
- 1992 Winter Olympics
- L'Hôpital (Savoie)
