= Conflans, Savoie =

Former medieval town

Conflans
- Former medieval village
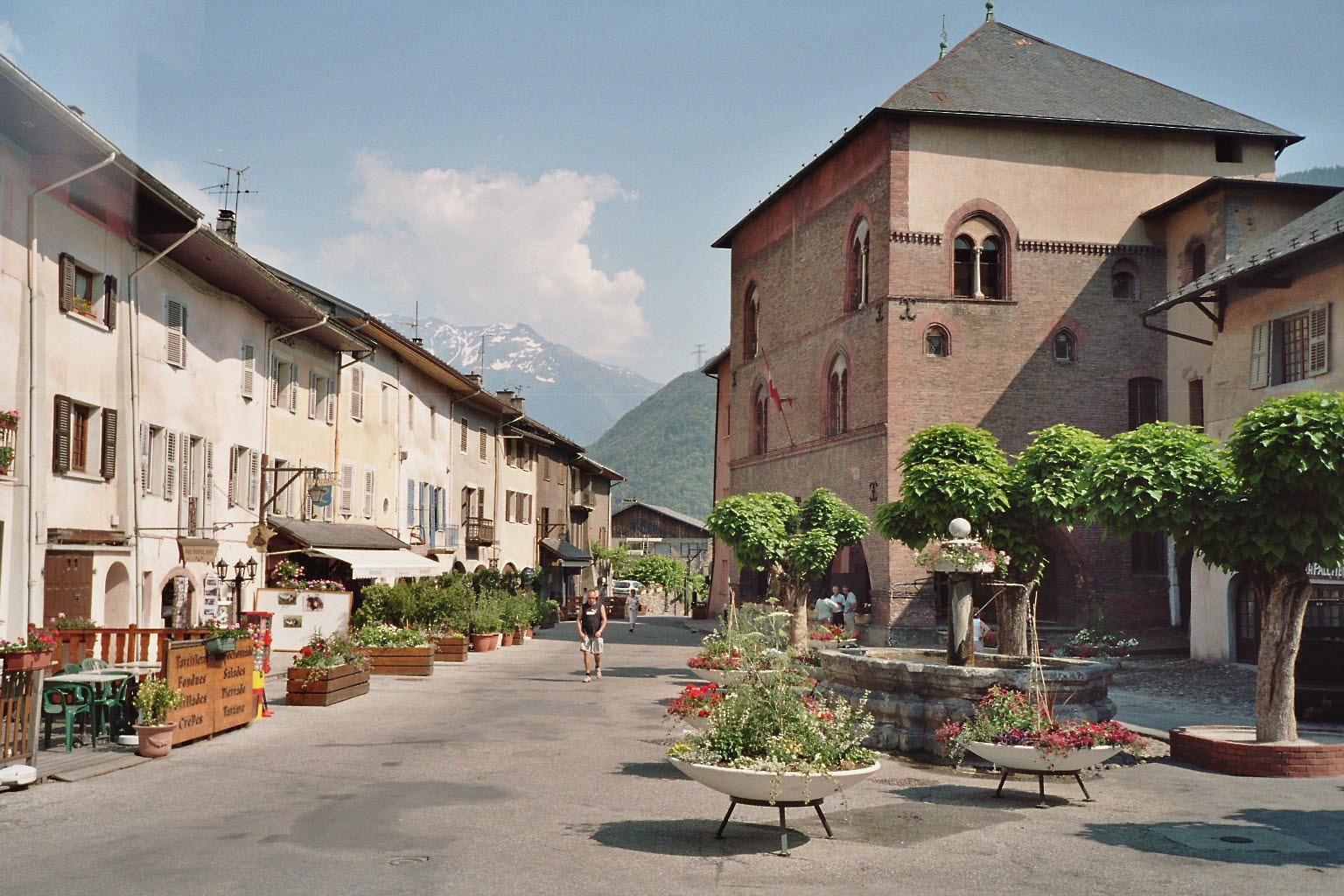
- Main square in Conflans, Maison Rouge and Conflans Art and History Museum

- Interactive map of Conflans
- Location within France
- Country: France
- Region: Auvergne-Rhône-Alpes
- Department: Savoie
- Province: Savoie Propre
- City: Albertville
- Elevation: 404 m (1,325 ft)
- Tourist attractions Conflans Church, listed as a historic monument (1989); Saracen Tower, listed as a historic monument (1928); Porte de Savoie, listed as a historic monument (1928); Porte Tarine, listed as a historic monument (1928); Maison Rouge, listed as a historic monument (1904, 1913); House with turrets, listed as a historic monument (1928); Château Rouge, listed as a historic monument (1928); Château de Manuel, listed as a historic monument (1928)

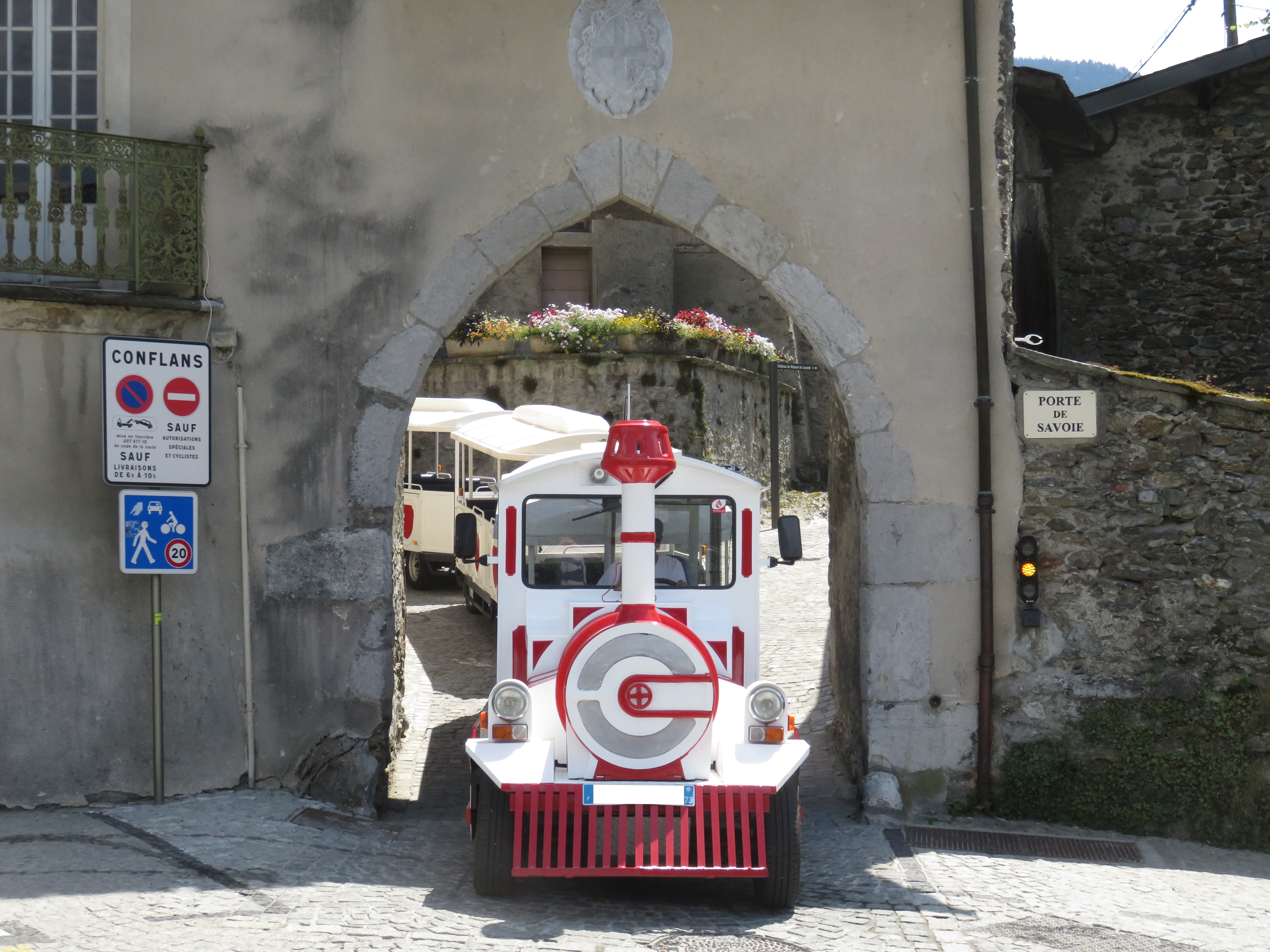
The tourist train passing under the Porte de Savoie in July 2018.

Conflans (also spelled Conflens) is a former medieval town located in the historical region of Tarentaise. It is now a district of the municipality of Albertville, in the Savoie department of the Auvergne-Rhône-Alpes region, France.

Historically fortified, Conflans controlled access to the Tarentaise Valley. In the 19th century, it served as the administrative center of the Haute-Savoie province. On December 19, 1835, it was merged with the nearby village of L'Hôpital-sous-Conflans, situated in the valley below, to form the town of Albertville.

== Geography ==
=== Location ===
Conflans is a former fortified town located on a rocky promontory at the confluence of the Arly and Isère rivers.

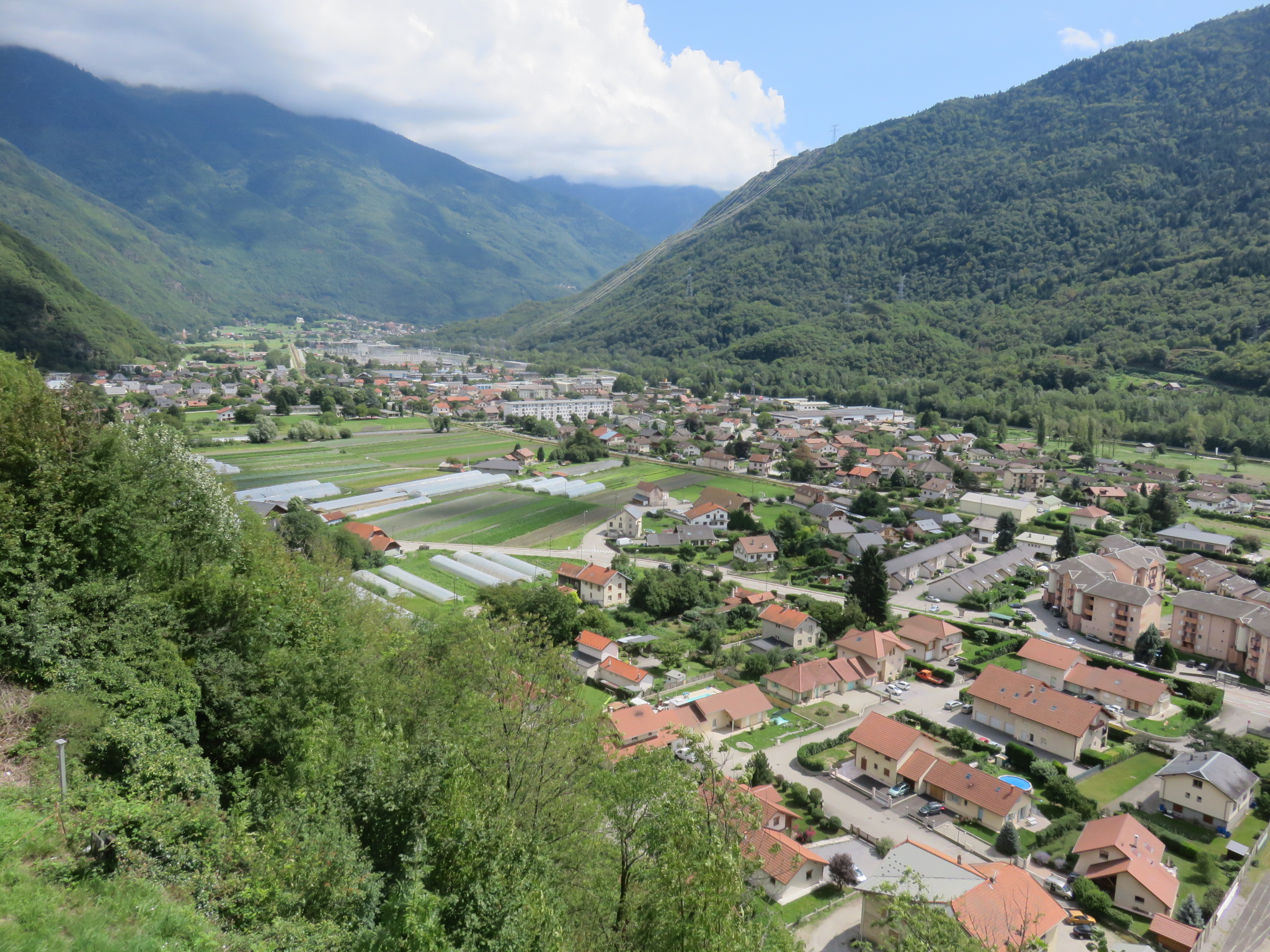
Tarentaise Valley

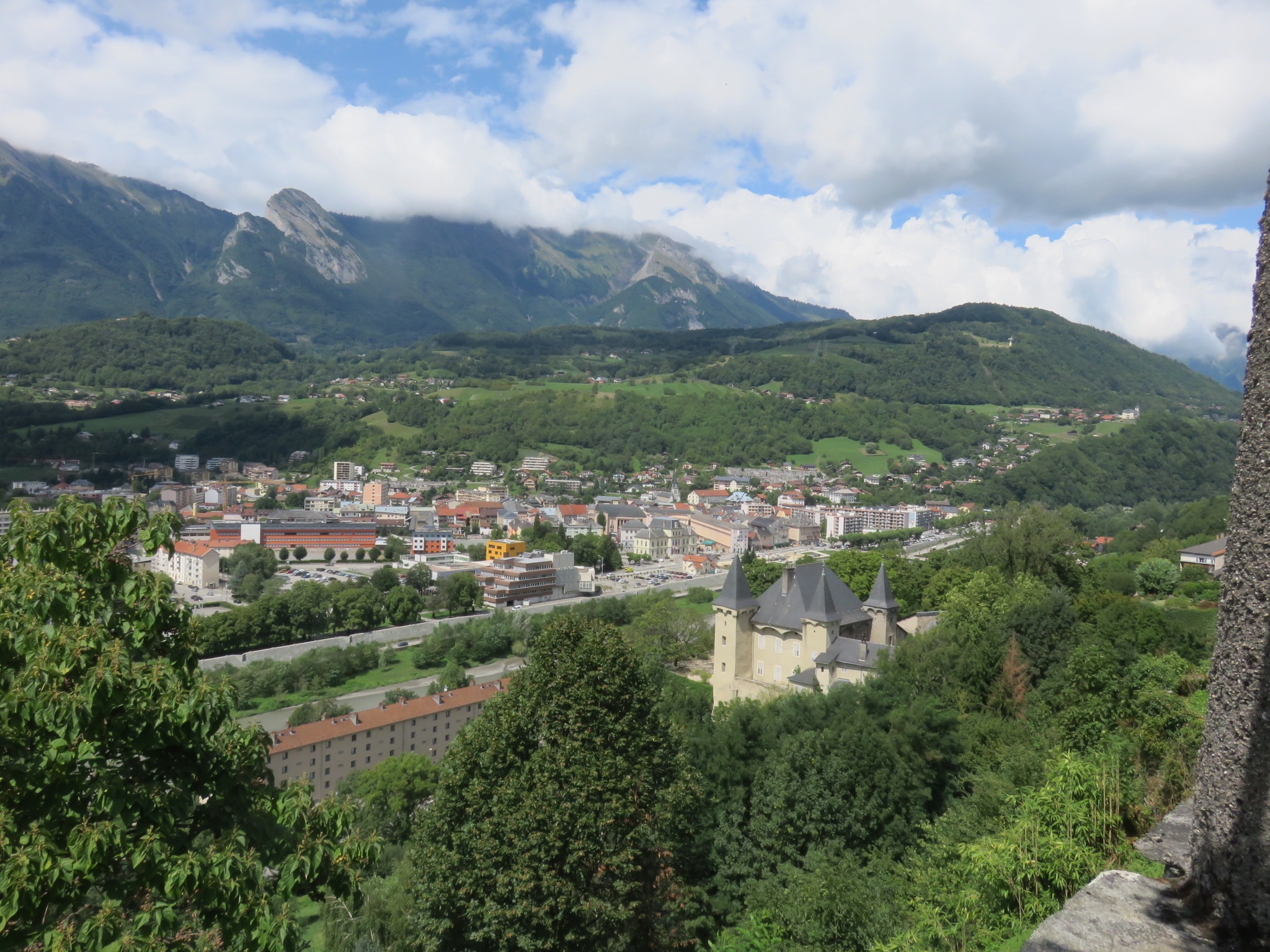
Albertville

Its position provided strategic control over a key geographical, economic, and military crossroads linking several natural and historical regions, including the Tarentaise Valley, the Arly Valley, the Beaufortain, and the Combe de Savoie. The site also allowed for surveillance of the salt trade route originating from the royal saltworks of Moûtiers. This route followed the ancient Roman road Alpis Graia, which connected Lyon (Lugdunum), the capital of Roman Gaul, to Rome via Vienne, the Little St Bernard Pass, the Aosta Valley, and Milan.

The fortified town remains accessible by only two roads.

=== Access ===
The fortified town of Conflans is accessible by two roads from the city of Albertville.

In 2015, the regional transit authority Co.RAL introduced a bus service operating on Thursdays, coinciding with the city center market day, to connect Albertville’s center with Conflans. The service was discontinued the following summer due to low ridership.

In the summer of 2018, a tourist train was tested for three months on a route linking Albertville’s city hall, municipal campground, Conflans, and the train station. Launched at the end of June, the service was terminated in early August due to limited use.

== Toponym ==
The place name Conflans is first attested in a 1015 charter related to a donation to Queen Ermengarde, under the form Conflenz. Variants appear in subsequent centuries, including Confluenti (1139), Conflens (1189), and Ecclesia de Confleto (1267, 1286) about the church. Later forms include Cofflens (1391) and Conflentz (1638).

The name derives from the Latin confluens or confluentes, meaning "confluence," referencing the town’s location at the meeting point of rivers.

== History ==
=== Medieval period ===
The earliest recorded mention of Conflans dates to 1014, when King Rudolf III of Burgundy donated the Church of Sainte-Marie to his wife, Ermengarde.

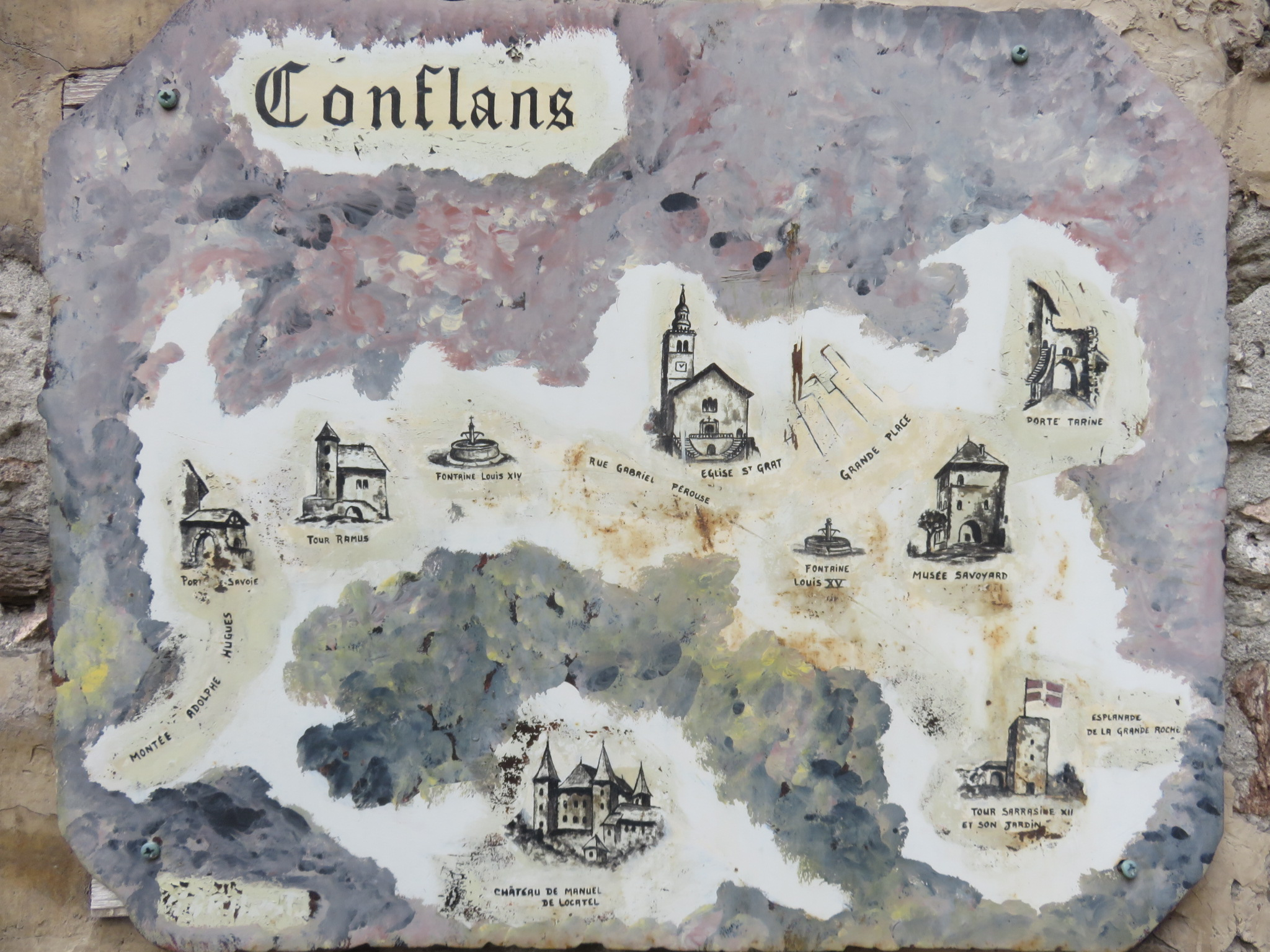
Tourist map

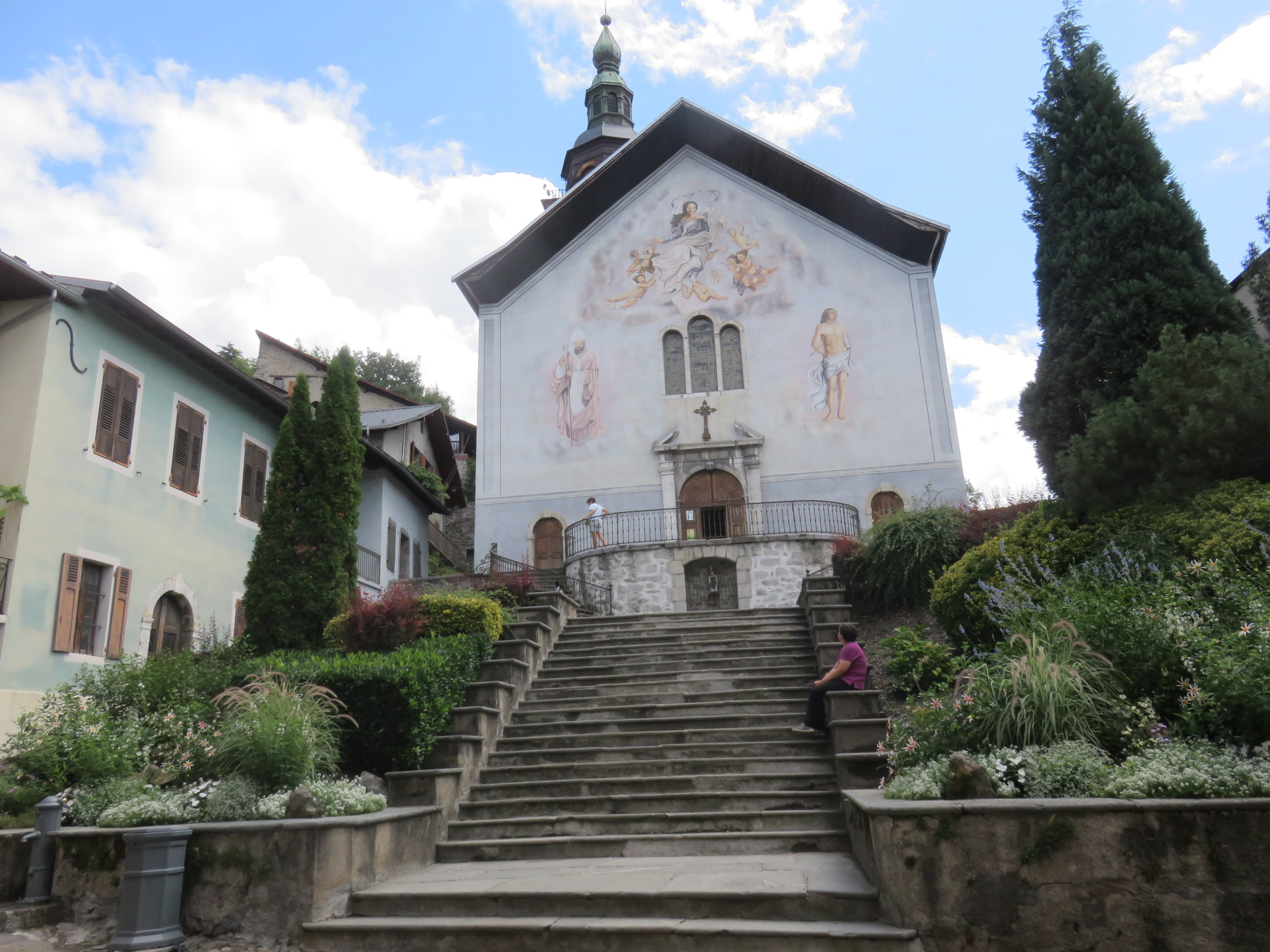
Saint-Grat Church in Conflans

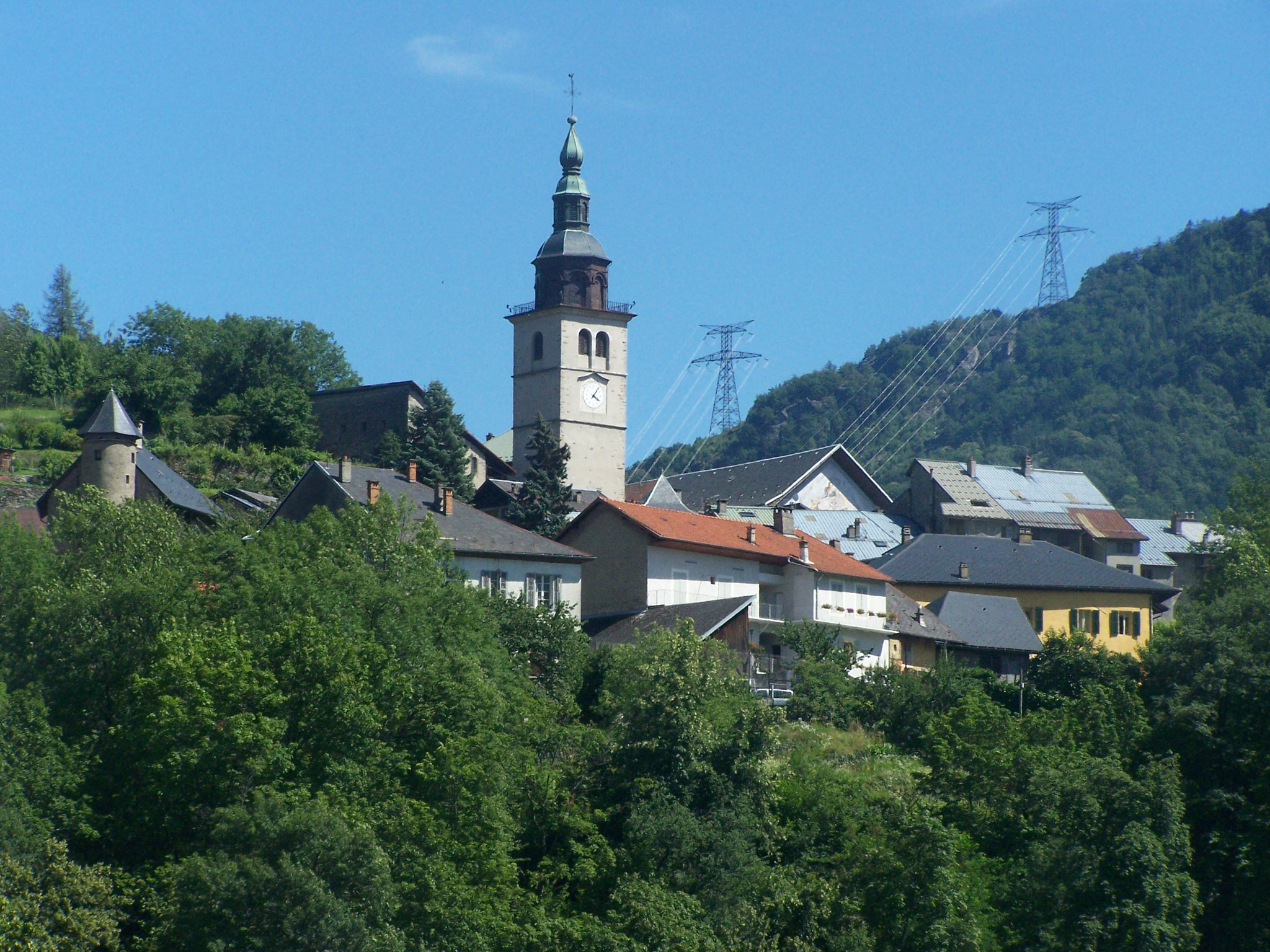
Conflans seen from Albertville, with Saint-Grat Church.

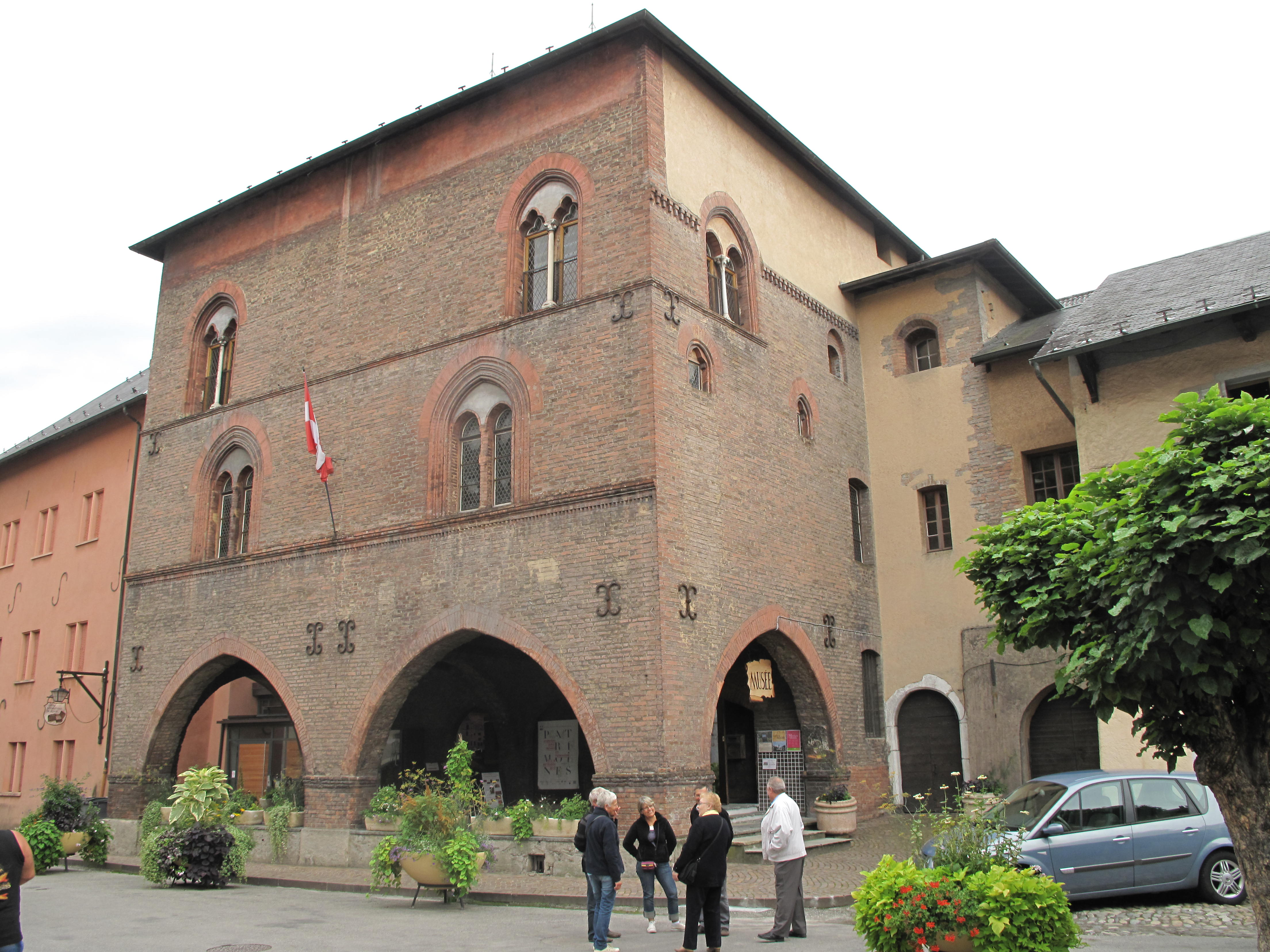
Maison Rouge and Conflans Art and History Museum

Situated on a steep promontory at the confluence of the Isère and Arly rivers and accessible from only two sides, the site occupied a strategic position at the intersection of key routes linking the Combe de Savoie, the Tarentaise Valley, the Beaufortain, and the road to Annecy. In the 12th century, the fortress was protected by a castrum known as le Châtel, which included a fortified house (domus) integrated into the enclosure near the main gate. The archbishop-counts of Tarentaise controlled the church and part of the castrum, while the Counts of Savoy also asserted influence in the area. In 1139, the Savoyards sold their rights to the tithes and several neighboring parishes to the archbishop. In 1254, the Count of Savoy confirmed the métralie (a form of local jurisdiction) of Conflans to the de la Cour family, a cadet branch of the Conflans (or Conflens) lineage. According to Roubert (1961), Count Thomas I settled a dispute between Humbert and Jacques de Conflans by awarding the métralie to Humbert and the castrum to Jacques.

The castrum of Conflans remained or reverted to the ownership of the Conflans (also spelled Conflens) family. The domus, or fortified house, later came under the control of a branch of the Avalon family known as the Romestaing, who entered the sphere of influence of the House of Savoy toward the end of the 13th century.

The maison forte of La Cour (also referred to as de Curia), documented from the late 12th century, was owned by the Conflans family, as was a third castle, Châtel-sous-Conflans, located on the left bank of the Arly River and featuring a tower known as the Pierre-Nasine. Two additional castles in the area were constructed later: the Château Rouge, dating from the 14th century, and the Château de Costaroche, a manor house built in the late 16th century by Count Manuel de Locatel.

In 1289, the castrum was granted as a fief by the archbishops of Tarentaise to a branch of the Duin family. However, Raymond de Duin had already married the heiress of the senior branch of the Conflans family in 1230, and their descendants retained the Conflans name until the mid-14th century.

From the mid-13th century, the Counts of Savoy gradually expanded their control over Conflans. After acquiring the métralie in the early 14th century, the counts merged the castellanies of Conflans and L’Hôpital into a single administrative unit known as the castellany of Conflans.

=== Modern period ===
In 1600, the fortress of Conflans was captured by French forces during the siege of the Château de Conflans, as part of the Franco-Savoyard War (1600–1601). On March 6, 1621, Duke Charles Emmanuel I of Savoy elevated Conflans to the status of a marquisate in favor of Gérard de Watteville, known as de Joux, a member of a Swiss noble family, as compensation for the loss of the marquisate of Versoix in the Pays de Gex.

Following Gérard de Watteville, the marquisate passed to several successors: Philippe-François de Bussolin; Jean-Charles de Watteville, a Knight of the Golden Fleece; Charles-Emmanuel de Watteville, a general of Spanish cavalry and also a Knight of the Golden Fleece; and Maximilien-Emmanuel de Watteville, the fifth Marquis of Conflans. On February 4, 1745, the marquisate was sold to Louis-François de Chambray (1737–1807), a member of a Norman noble family. The Watteville line became extinct in 1752, at which point Conflans reverted to the House of Savoy.

In 1771, Claude-Humbert de Rolland, Archbishop of Tarentaise, was granted the honorary title of Prince of Conflans and of Saint-Sigismond by King Charles Emmanuel III of Sardinia.

=== Contemporary period ===
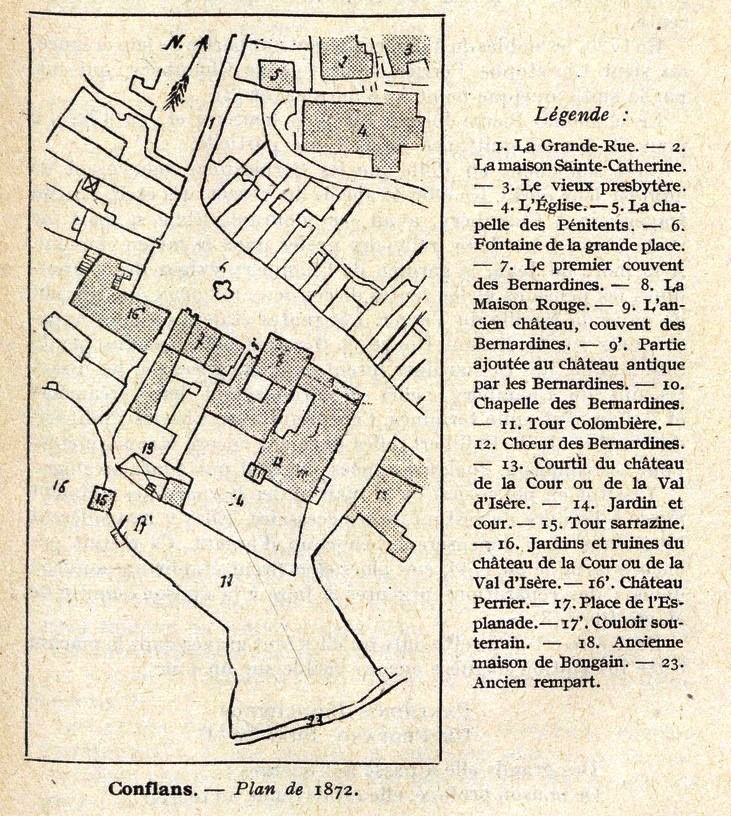
Map of Conflans in 1872, taken from a book by J. Garin

During the French Revolution, Conflans was annexed along with the rest of Savoy and temporarily renamed Roc-Libre. The neighboring village of L’Hôpital-sous-Conflans was renamed Bourg-de-Santé.

On December 19, 1835, Duke Charles Albert of Savoy merged Conflans and L'Hôpital-sous-Conflans to form the commune of Albertville, which was named in his honor.

== Demographics ==
The inhabitants are called Conflarains.

Population of Conflans (the town and Les Adoubes)
1561	1773	1783	1828
873	1,306	772	1,574
Sources: Histoire des communes savoyardes : Albertville et son arrondissement

== Heritage ==
The village contains several monuments, some of which are classified or listed as historic monuments. The municipality of Albertville has been designated a Ville d’Art et d’Histoire (Town of Art and History) in recognition of its cultural and architectural heritage.

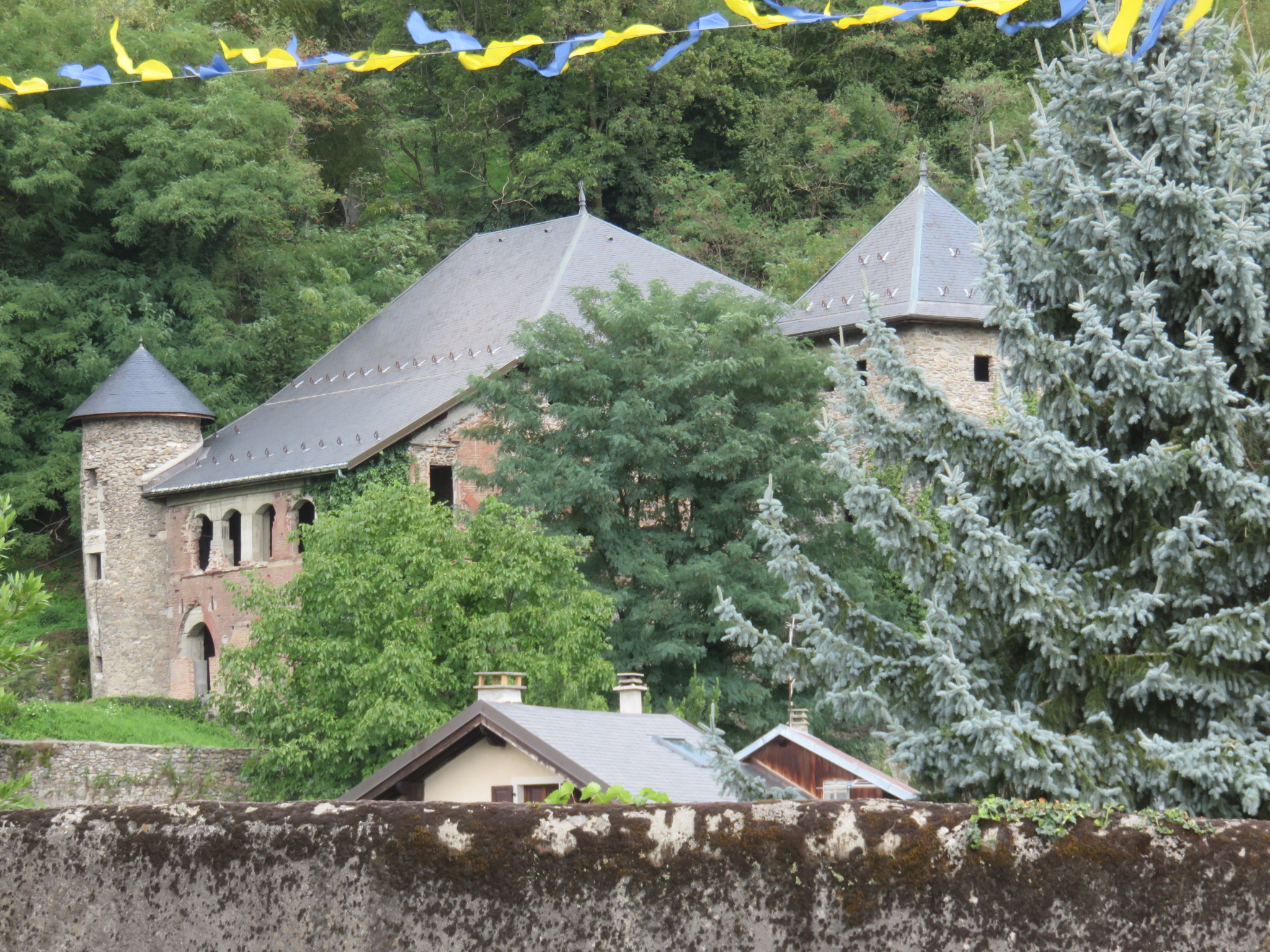
Red Castle.

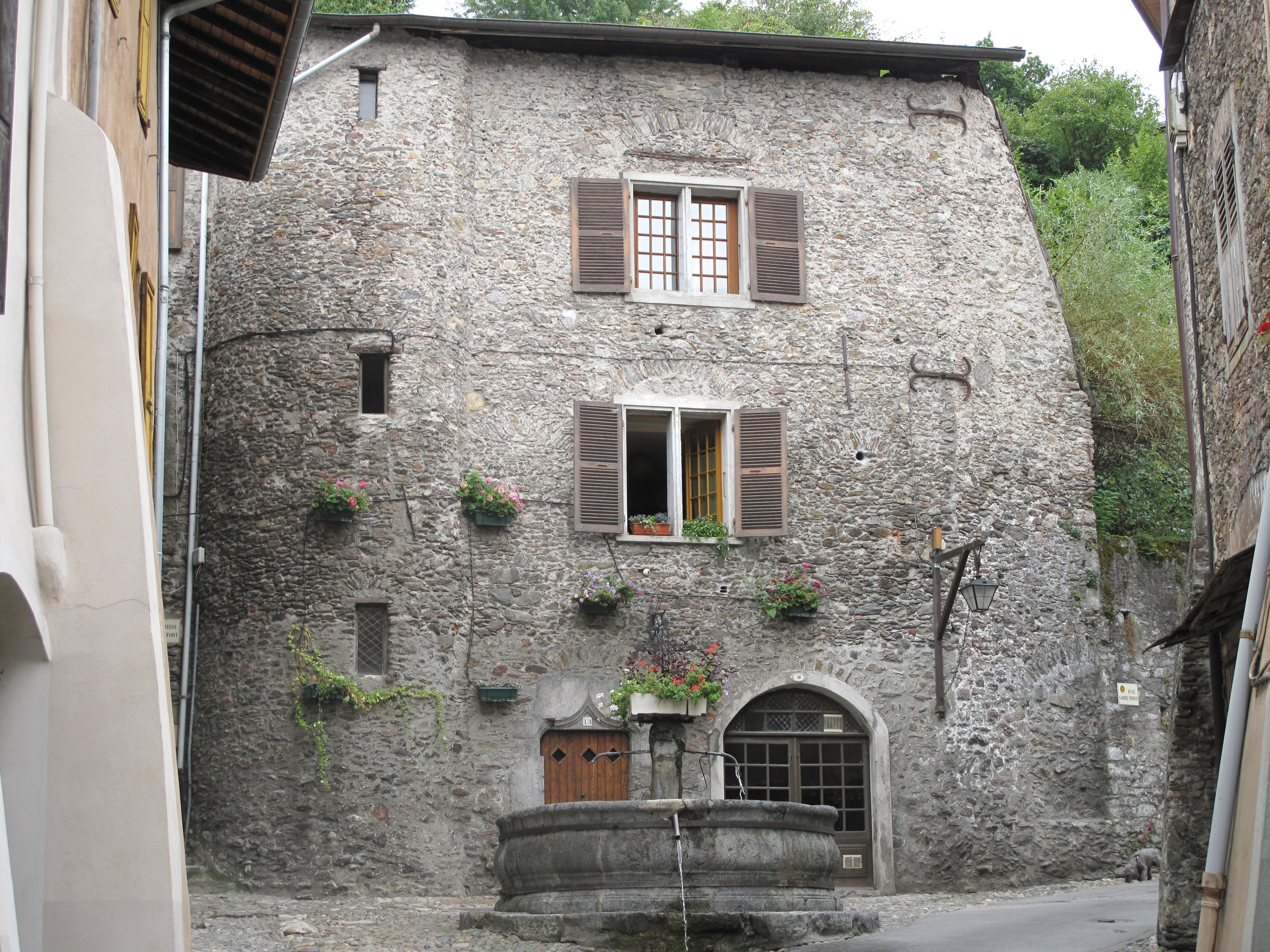
Anselme Fountain (1711).

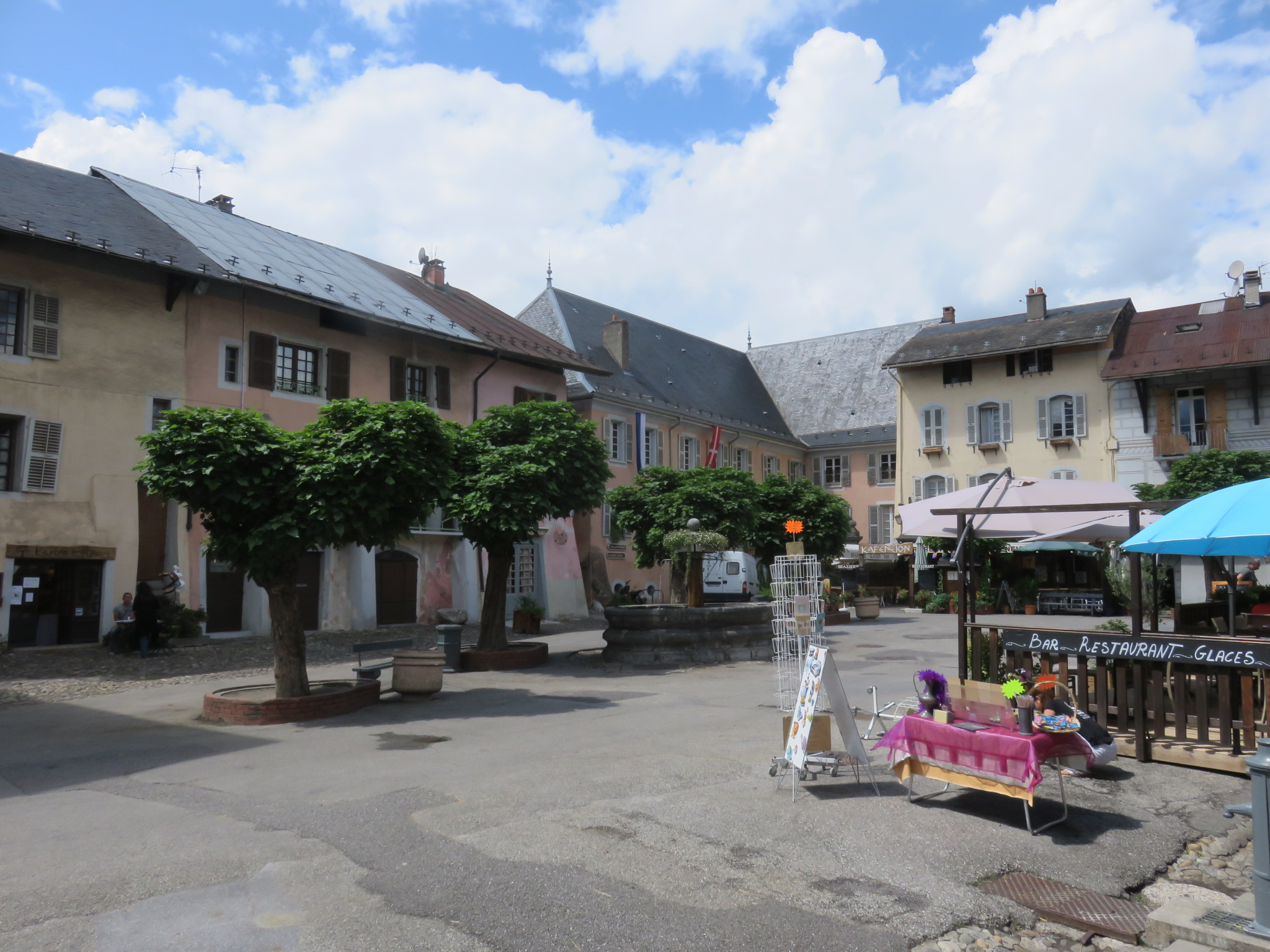
Main square (before renovation).

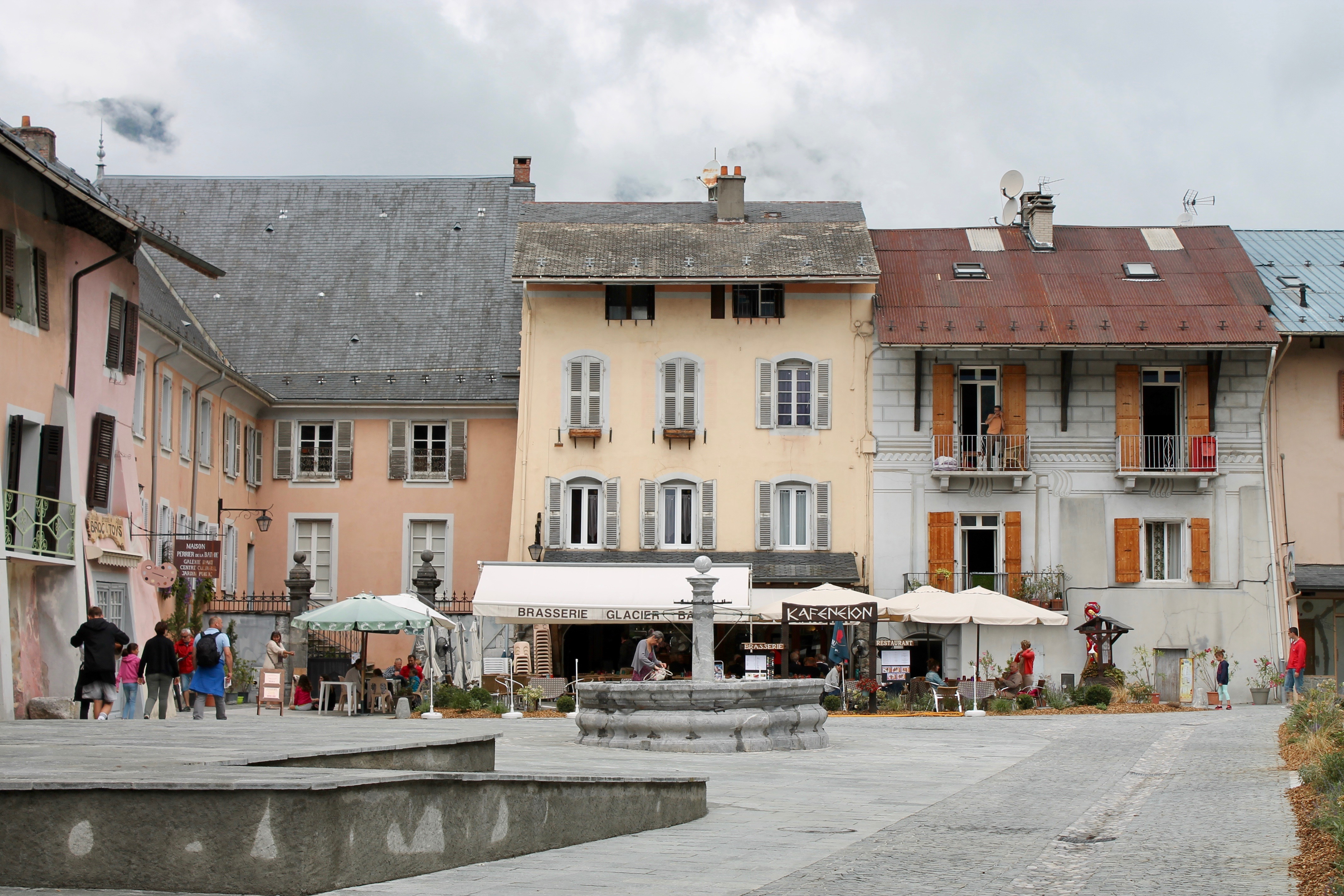
Main square (after renovation, in 2017).

The heritage includes, in particular:

- The medieval fortress of Conflans, referred to as le Châtel, Châtel-sur-Conflans, or the comtal castle, is documented as early as the 11th century. Situated on elevated ground north of the town, approximately 300 meters above the church, it was partially owned by the lords of Conflans and fell under the jurisdiction of the Archbishops of Tarentaise. From the 13th to the 16th century, the fortress was held in fief by the Duin family.
- The fortified house of La Cour, attested from the 12th century, is now represented by the Saracen Tower, a square keep that is a surviving element of the original structure. The fortified house was destroyed in the 18th century, though a 16th-century gateway remains. The tower is located at the junction of the old castle and the Grande Roche.
- The Château Rouge, also known as the fortified house of Le Noyer, is a brick structure dating from the late 14th century. Over time, it was owned by various families, including Belletruche, Garrivod, Granier, Apponex, Roger, Rey, and Favier du Noyer.
- The Maison Rouge, constructed circa 1397, is currently home to the Museum of Art and History of Conflans. It was successively owned by the Voisin, Tondu, Riddes, and Verger families, and later by the Bernardine nuns.
- The town's fortifications include two principal gates from the 15th century: the Porte de Savoie (also referred to as Porte de France) and the Porte Tarine. These vaulted gateways served as main entrances to the walled town. The Porte de Savoie faced the Combe de Savoie and the former County of Savoy, while the Porte Tarine opened toward the Tarentaise Valley. The Grande-Rue connects the two.
- The Château de Costaroche, also known as the manor of Manuel de Locatel, is a late 16th-century residence built by Count Manuel de Locatel.
- Several streets dating from the 17th and 18th centuries, constructed between 1579 and 1583, were historically associated with the Locatel and Manuel families.
- The maison à tourelles, or Ramus Tower, is a notable residence near the Porte de Savoie. It served as the seigneurial home of the Ramus family.
- The Church of Saint-Grat, dedicated to Saint Grat, dates from the 18th century and is located within the town.
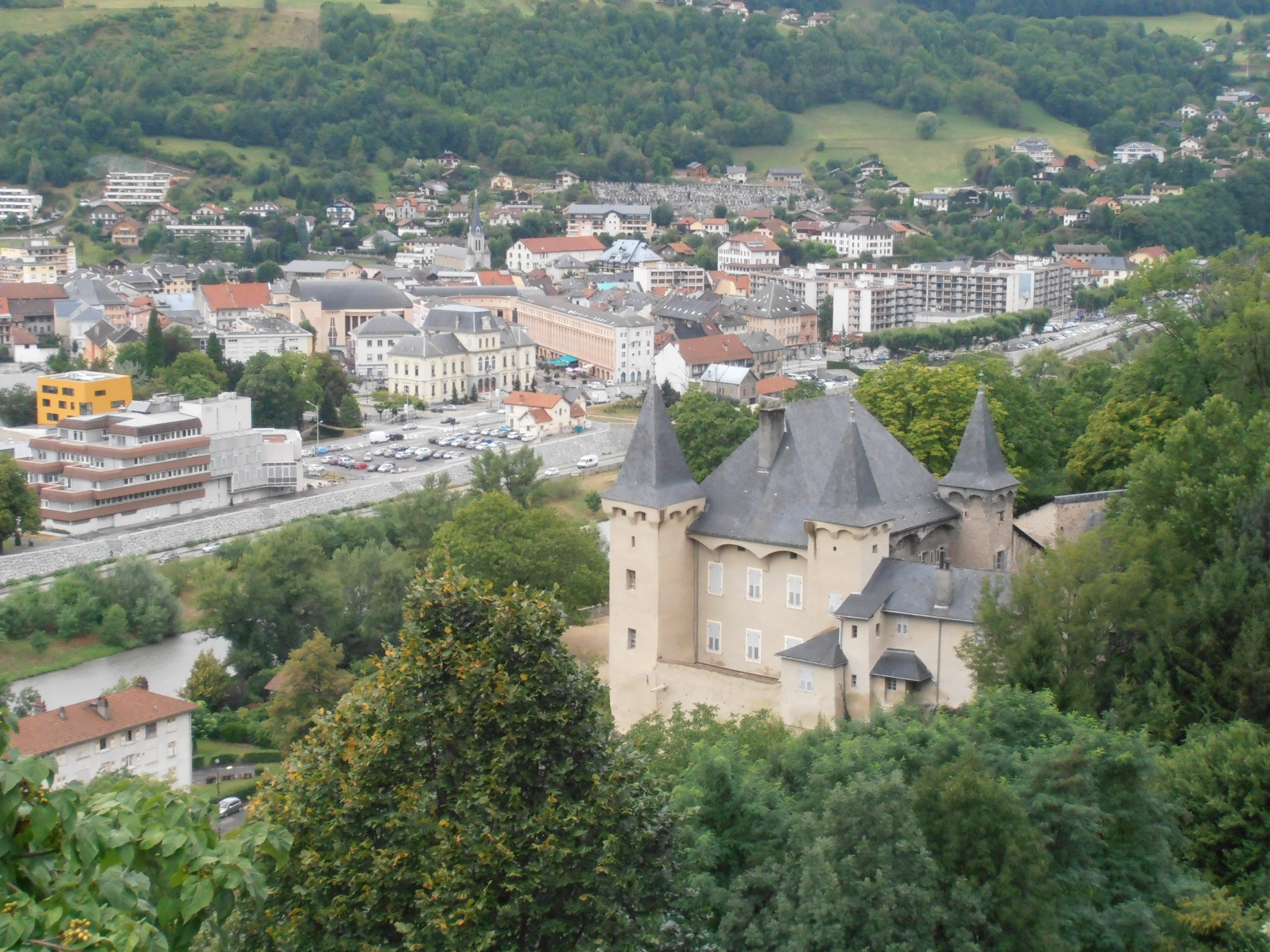
Manuel de Locatel Castle, with a view of Albertville.

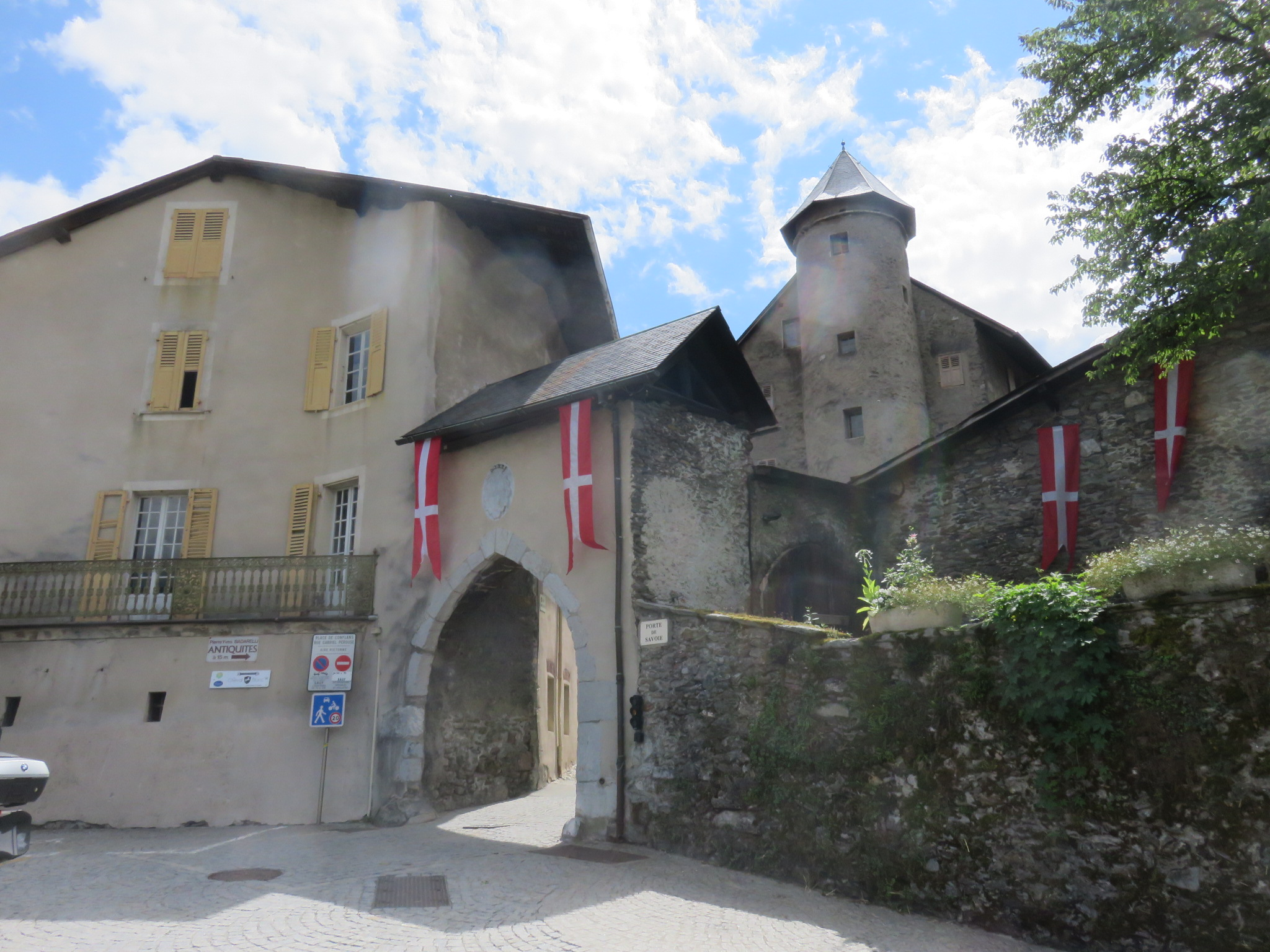
Gateway to Savoie, and Ramus Tower.

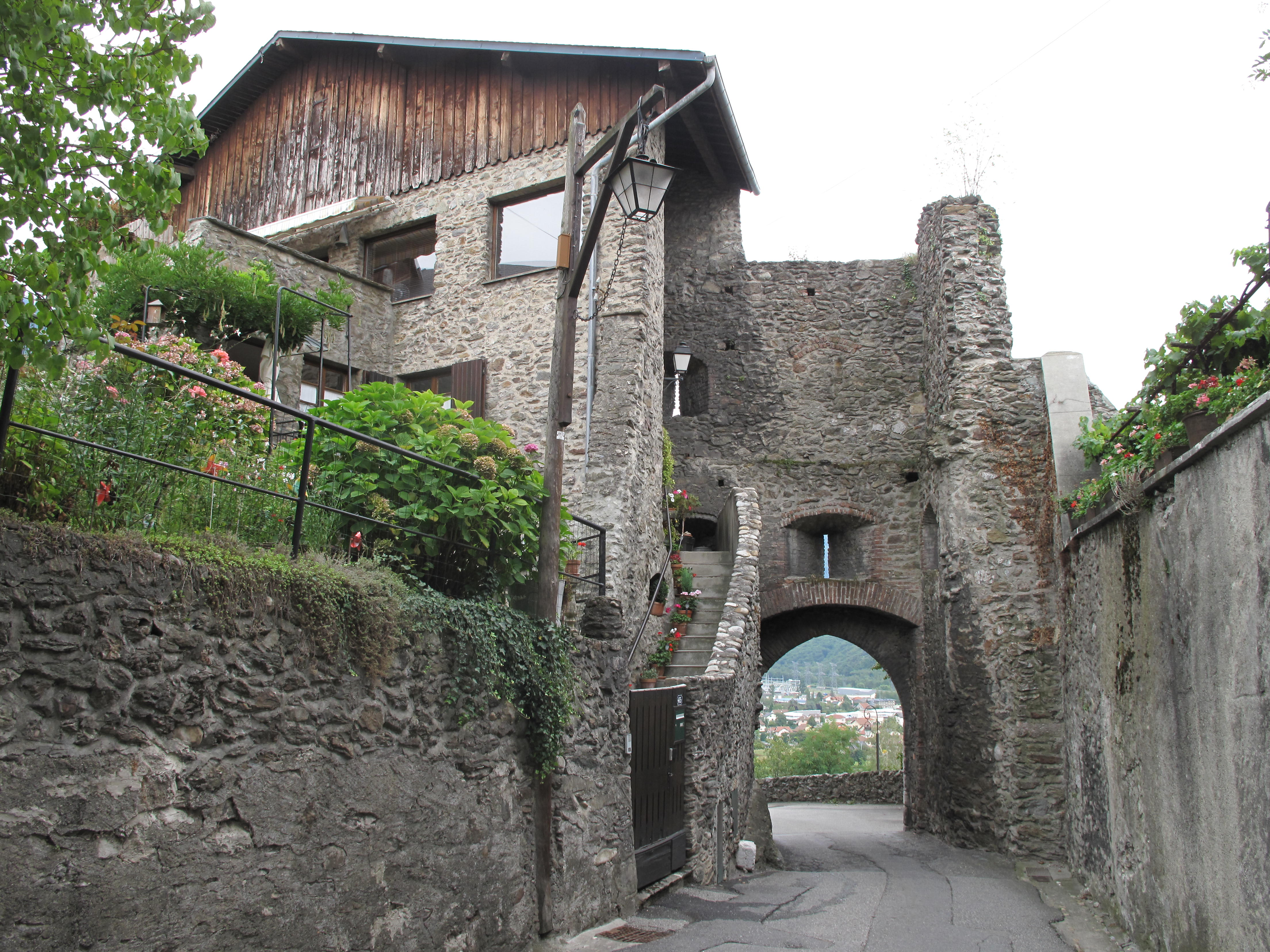
Tarine Gate (road to Turin and Tarentaise Valley).

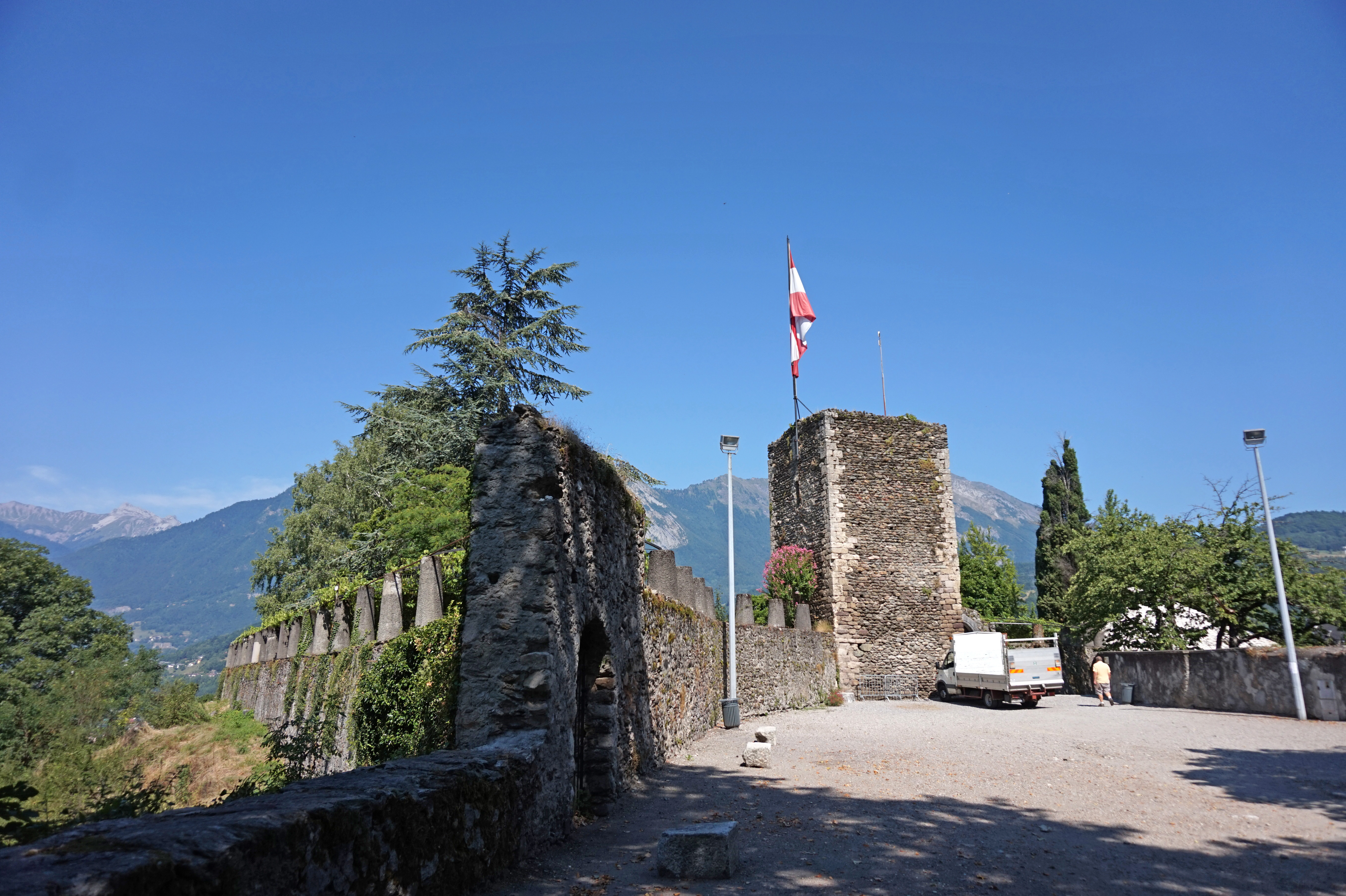
Keep / Sarrasine tower from the 12th century, ramparts, and public garden of the Sarrasine tower.

Portions of the medieval town walls of Conflans are still extant. The town previously contained several now-lost structures, including the fortified house of La Petite Roche, which was demolished in the 18th century; the Tour Nasine, also known as the Tour de la Pierre, documented in 1319 and used as a place of detention; and the Tour Colombière, possibly dating from the 12th century.

== Paintings ==
The painter Henri Rivière created several paintings of Conflans in 1918.

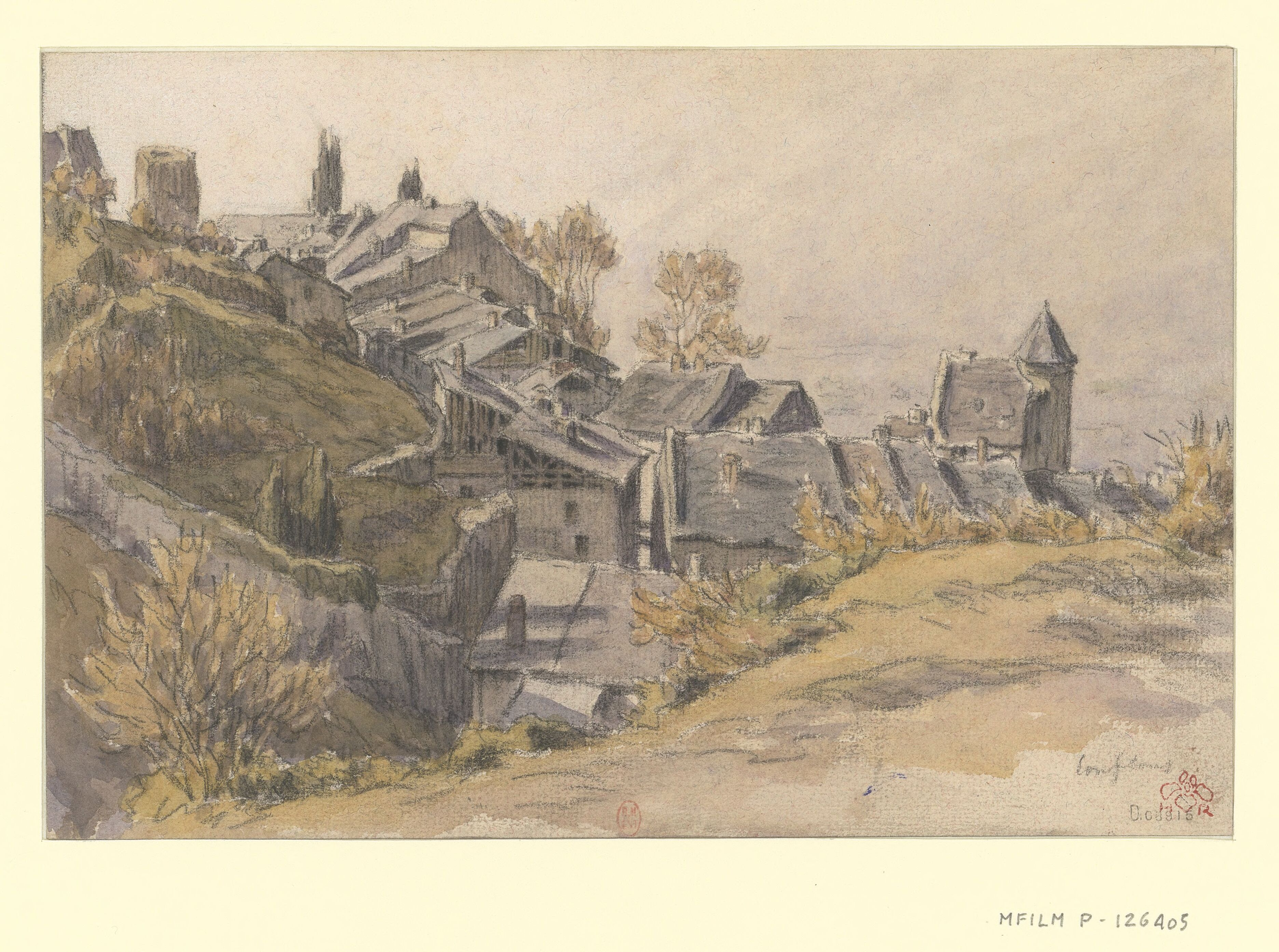
Village of Conflans [Savoie] (drawing, 1918).

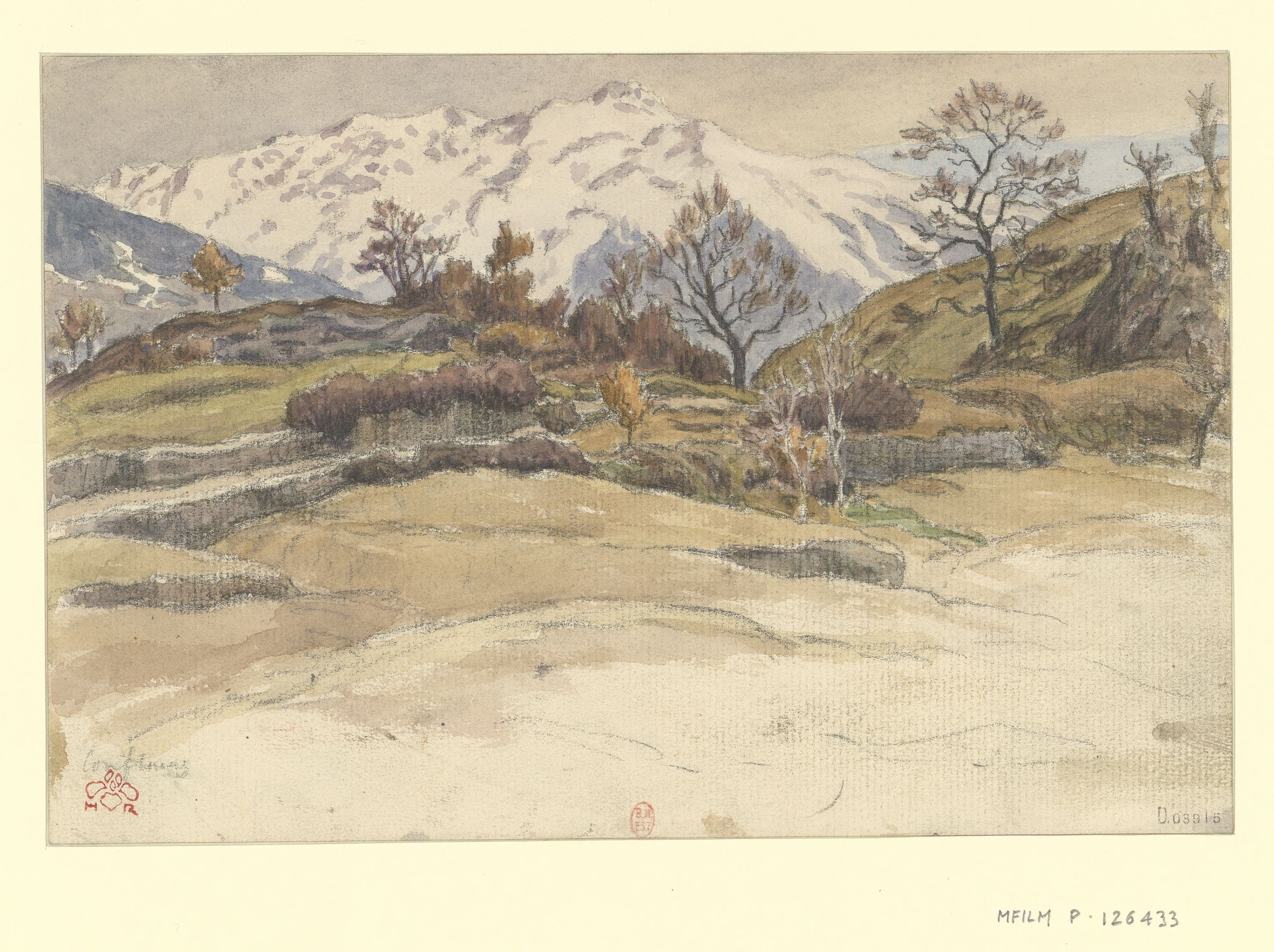
Conflans [Savoie] (drawing, 1918).

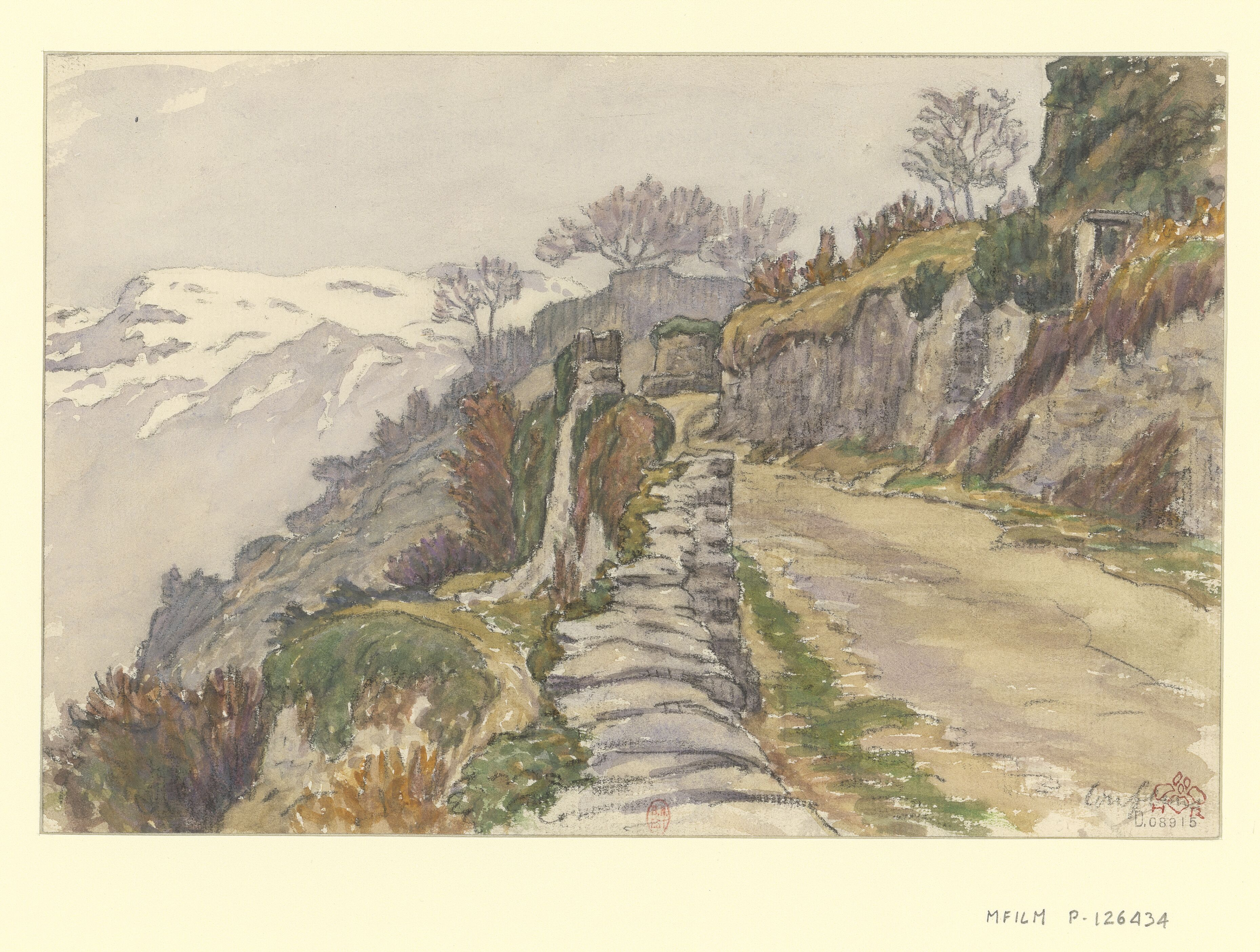
Conflans, mountain road [Savoie] (drawing, 1918).

== Heraldry ==

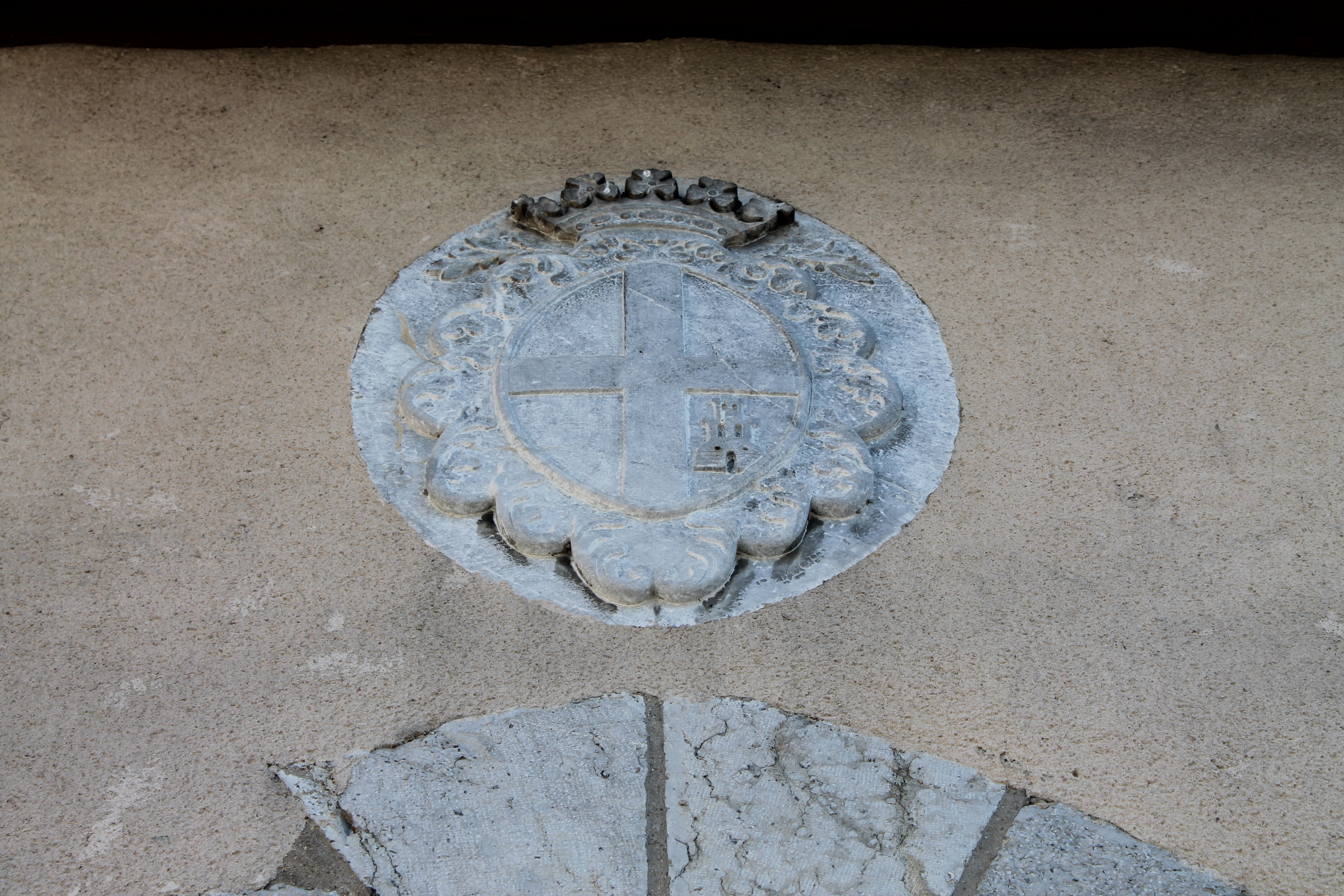

The coat of arms of Conflans is blazoned: Gules, a cross argent, with a tower of the same in the lower left quarter.

It appears on the Porte de Savoie and incorporates the cross of the House of Savoy, indicating the town’s historical feudal allegiance. The tower may symbolize the Saracen Tower, a surviving element of the town’s medieval fortifications.

== See also ==
- Tourism in Savoie
- List of historical monuments in Savoy
- Medieval fortification
- L'Hôpital (Savoie)

== Bibliography ==
- Garin, Joseph (1932). Une ville morte : Conflans en Savoie. Guide historique et archéologique avec illustrations et plans précédé d'une Petite Histoire de l'Hôpital et de Conflans et d'un guide rapide de l'Hôpital-Albertville [A dead town: Conflans in Savoie. Historical and archaeological guide with illustrations and maps, preceded by a brief history of the hospital and Conflans and a quick guide to the hospital in Albertville.] (in French). Vol. 7. Moûtiers: Recueil des mémoires et documents de l'Académie de la Val d'Isère.
- Hudry, Marius (1982). Histoire des communes savoyardes : Albertville et son arrondissement [History of Savoyard municipalities: Albertville and its district] (PDF) (in French). Vol. 4. Roanne: Éditions Horvath. ISBN 978-2-7171-0263-5. Archived from the original (PDF) on December 30, 2016.
- Maistre, Chantal; Maistre, Gilbert (1999). Conflans : promenade historique [Conflans: historical walk]. Cahiers du Vieux Conflans (in French). Vol. 160. La Fontaine de Siloé. ISBN 978-2-84206-112-8.
- Ménabréa, Henri (1997) [1936]. La Savoie - 1 : Au seuil des Alpes de Savoie : Combe de Savoie, Albertville, Conflans, Val d'Arly, Beaufort, Tarentaise [Savoie - 1: At the gateway to the Savoie Alps: Combe de Savoie, Albertville, Conflans, Val d'Arly, Beaufort, Tarentaise]. Les Savoisiennes (in French). La Fontaine de Siloé. ISBN 978-2-84206-069-5.
- Roubert, Jacqueline (1961). "La seigneurie des Archevêques Comtes de Tarentaise du Xe au XVIe siècle : Les seigneurs de Conflans" [The lordship of the Archbishops Counts of Tarentaise from the 10th to the 16th century: The lords of Conflans]. Mémoires de l'Académie des sciences, belles-lettres et arts de Savoie (in French). 5: 153–157.
- Uginet, François Charles (1967). Conflans en Savoie et son mandement du XIIe au XVe siècle (Thesis) (in French). École Nationale des Chartes.
