= L'Hôpital (Savoie) =

Commune of the Duchy of Savoy

- Hospital
- Interactive map of L'Hôpital
- Country: Duchy of Savoy
- Established: 1200

L'Hôpital, formerly known as L'Hôpital-sous-Conflans, was once a commune in the Duchy of Savoy and later became part of the Kingdom of Sardinia. Established in the 13th century, it was merged with the neighboring town of Conflans on 19 December 1835 to create the modern city of Albertville.

== Geography ==
L'Hôpital was located on the right bank of the Arly River, upstream from its confluence with the Isère. It formed part of the natural region known as the upper Combe de Savoie. The original settlement was established on the Chaudan plateau, elevated above the river to avoid flooding, near the former Pont des Adoubes.

L'Hôpital was situated opposite the fortified borough of Conflans, at the junction of the Combe de Savoie and the Tarentaise region. The site lay along the Isère Valley and near the former Roman road In Alpe Graia, which connected to the Petit Saint-Bernard Pass. The location also provided access to the Beaufortain and the Arly Valley, leading toward Ugine. Strategically positioned, it later came to be known as the "Albertville crossroads”, though, as one historian noted, it only clearly developed three of the four major routes.

== History ==
=== Foundation by the Hospitallers ===
The origins of L'Hôpital likely date to the establishment of a hospital by the Knights Hospitallers of the Order of Saint John of Jerusalem. This institution served primarily as a hospice for travelers and pilgrims, a "hospital" in the medieval sense: a place of shelter, care, and lodging for the poor and wayfarers.

Although some historical accounts, such as that of Canon Adolphe Gros, argue that there is no clear evidence of a hospital or hospice in the modern sense, documents confirm its early existence. On 31 March 1219, a donation by Béatrice of Vienne, Countess of Savoy, to the Carthusian monastery of Vallon referred to the site as hospitalis de Jerusalem. Another mention appears in 1235, citing a commander of “the house of the Hospital of Conflans.” The command post was later placed under the authority of the Hospitaller commandery of Chambéry, which itself was subordinate to the Grand Priory of Auvergne. No formal founding charter for the site is currently known.

A settlement soon developed around the hospital, directly across from the fortified town of Conflans. It was established under the jurisdiction of the Archbishop of Tarentaise and the protection of the Count of Savoy. The site was later granted the status of a free town by Count Amadeus V of Savoy, who sought to assert control over the strategic Arly River crossing.

By 1285, the borough was mentioned in castellany records as the "new town of L'Hôpital-sous-Conflans." Louis Falletti, in his Elements of a Chronological Table of the Franchises of Savoy, does not clarify which castellany it belonged to. Around this time, the settlement received a charter of liberties under the name Villefranche-de-L'Hôpital—granted amid tensions between the Count of Savoy and the neighboring powers of Geneva and the Dauphiné. However, Jean-Pierre Dubourgeat, President of the Friends of Old Conflans, noted that these privileges offered little in practical terms. At some point—certainly before 1502—the borough became a parish "member of Rhodes," still under the authority of the Hospitallers.

With the consolidation of comital power and the growing influence of Conflans, L'Hôpital came under the jurisdiction of the castellany of Conflans.

=== Modern period ===
Following the establishment of the Hospitallers in Malta, the order sold its properties in L'Hôpital to the Cistercian Bernardine convent of Conflans on 28 May 1671.

Despite periods of relative prosperity, L'Hôpital remained a small village in scale. The proximity of Conflans—home to the castellany's administrative seat—curtailed its growth. By the mid-18th century, the village had about 400 inhabitants.

This dynamic shifted with the construction of a major carriage road across the plain that bypassed Conflans. This new route spurred population growth in L'Hôpital, gradually elevating its status.

=== Contemporary period ===
On 18 February 1758, Charles Emmanuel III elevated L'Hôpital to the rank of a county. That same year, a fire destroyed several buildings. In response, the settlement was rebuilt as a linear village along the Grande Rue, parallel to the Arly River, with a perpendicular road connecting it to the bridge and to Conflans. Its function as a transportation hub was reflected in its social structure. According to Histoire des communes savoyardes: Albertville et son arrondissement (1982), in 1758 L'Hôpital was home to 98 families, almost all of whom were merchants, innkeepers, or artisans. In 1759, a weekly market and three annual fairs were established, increasing its commercial rivalry with Conflans.

In 1814, residents petitioned King Victor Emmanuel I of Sardinia to change its name to Saint-Victor. A few years later, during the visit of King Charles Felix of Savoy for the inauguration of new embankments along the Isère River, a proposal emerged to merge L'Hôpital, Conflans, and Saint-Sigismond into a single entity, possibly to be called Charles-ville. Jean-Pierre Dubourgeat suggested that the name “L'Hôpital” had fallen out of favor due to its association with the word “hospice,” contributing to the site’s neglect or even erasure in historical narratives, especially when compared to Conflans.

On 28 June 1815, the Battle of L'Hôpital took place between French troops under Colonel Thomas Robert Bugeaud and Austro-Sardinian forces during the Hundred Days.

Between 1829 and 1841, the courses of the Isère and Arly rivers were modified to allow for embankment works.

According to Dubourgeat, L'Hôpital’s steady growth from the 18th century onward eventually eclipsed Conflans, stripping it of its former advantages until it was fully absorbed.

On 19 December 1835, Duke Charles Albert of Savoy united the boroughs of Conflans and L'Hôpital to form the commune of Albertville, which was officially established on 1 January 1836.

== Demographics ==
Population trends
1561	1756	1776	1793	1804	1818	1828
236	253	365	510	704	910	1 720
(Sources: Petite Histoire de l'Hôpital et de Conflans (1932) Histoire des communes savoyardes: Albertville et son arrondissement (1982))

== Notable figures ==
- Henri Ract (1813–1883), native of L'Hôpital, deputy of Savoy in the Sardinian Parliament (1848–1849).

== See also ==
- Albertville

== Bibliography ==
- Garin, Joseph (1932). Une ville morte : Conflans en Savoie. Guide historique et archéologique avec illustrations et plans précédé d'une Petite Histoire de l'Hôpital et de Conflans et d'un guide rapide de l'Hôpital-Albertville [A dead town: Conflans en Savoie. Historical and archaeological guide with illustrations and maps, preceded by a brief history of the hospital and Conflans and a quick guide to the hospital in Albertville.] (in French). Vol. 7. Moûtiers: Académie de la Val d'Isère.
- Hudry, Marius (1982). Histoire des communes savoyardes : Albertville et son arrondissement (vol. 4) [History of Savoyard municipalities: Albertville and its district (vol. 4)] (in French). Roanne: Éditions Horvath. ISBN 978-2-7171-0263-5.
- Uginet, François Charles (1967). Conflans en Savoie et son mandement du XIIe au XVe siècle [Conflans in Savoie and its jurisdiction from the 12th to the 15th century] (Thesis) (in French). École Nationale des Chartes.
