= Négresse =

Mountain located in France

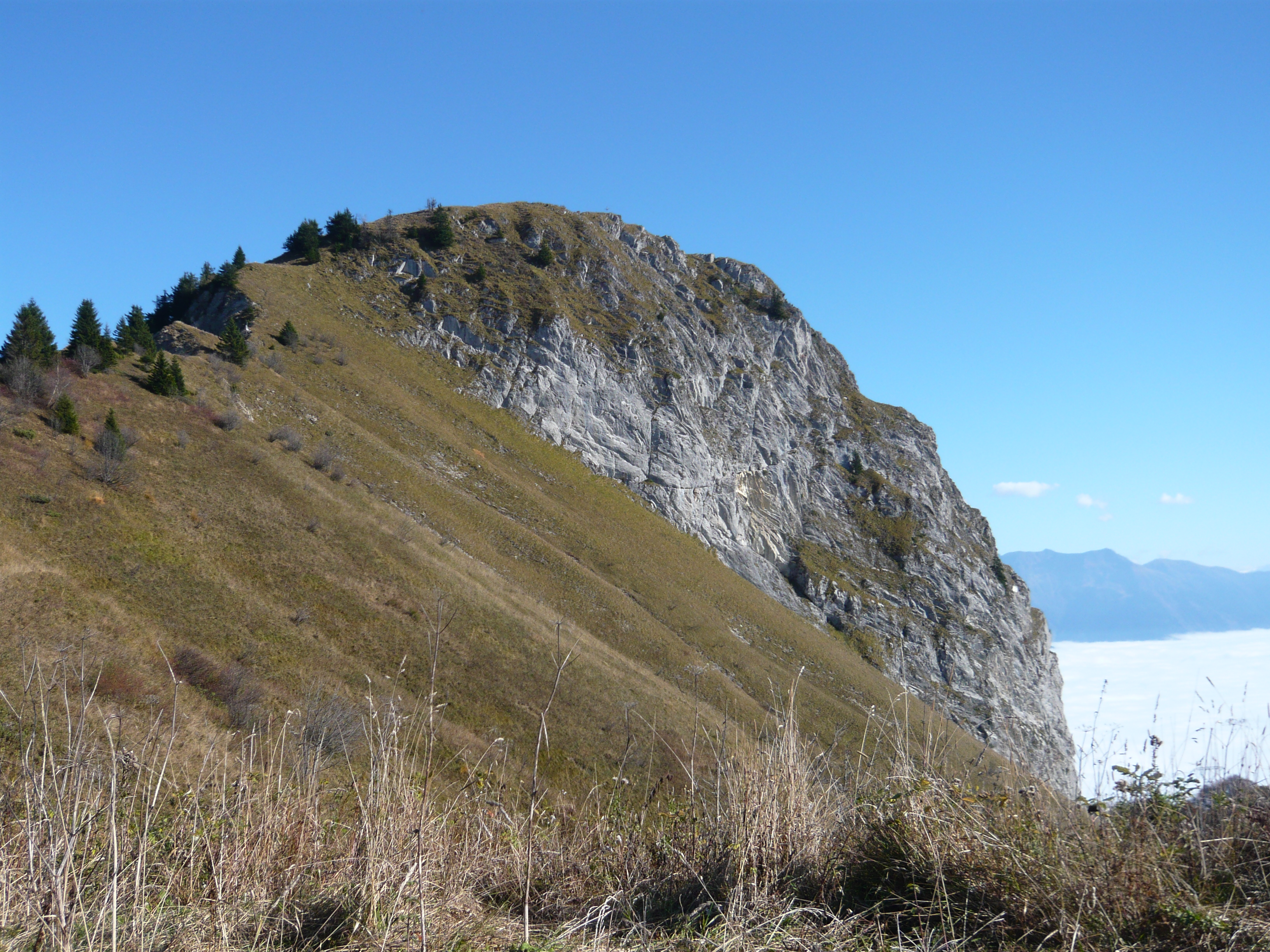

Highest point
- Elevation: 1,720 m (5,640 ft)
- Coordinates: 45°42′15″N 06°20′32″E

Geography
- Location within France
- Location: Savoie, France
- Parent range: Bauges

Négresse is a mountain of Savoie, France. It lies in the Bauges range. It has an elevation of 1,720 metres above sea level.
