= Canton of Albertville-Sud =

Coordinates: 45°37′45″N 6°24′52″E

Albertville-Sud
- Former canton
- Interactive map of Albertville-Sud
- Country: France
- Region: Auvergne-Rhône-Alpes
- Department: Savoie
- No. of communes: {{{nbcomm}}}
- Disbanded: 2015
- Area: 138.5 km^{2} (53.5 sq mi)
- Population (2012): 19,641
  - Density: 141.8/km^{2} (367.3/sq mi)

The Canton of Albertville-Sud is a French former administrative subdivision, situated in the Savoie département and the Rhône-Alpes région. It was created in 1973. It was disbanded following the French canton reorganisation which came into effect in March 2015. In 2012, the population was 19,641.

The Canton of Albertville-Sud consisted of the following communes:

- Albertville (partly)
- Cevins
- Esserts-Blay
- Gilly-sur-Isère
- Grignon
- La Bâthie
- Monthion
- Rognaix
- Saint-Paul-sur-Isère
- Tours-en-Savoie
