= Montfalcon family =

French family

Montfalcon Family
- Family coat of arms.
- Place of origin: Albanais
- Titles: Governor of Savoy (1583), lords
- Members: Cengle, Cevins, Chitry, Flaxieu, la Pesse, Mionaz, Montfalcon, Pierre-Charve, Roasson, Rumilly, Saint-Pierre-de-Soucy, Sillans, Tessy
- Traditions: Diocese of Lausanne, Geneva and Fribourg
- Cadet branches: Montfalcon de Flaxieu

The Montfalcon family is a noble lineage from Savoy, originally from the Albanais region.

According to the Historical Dictionary of Switzerland, the Montfalcon family established in Compesières (canton of Geneva) traces its origins to Novalaise, which distinguishes it from the Savoyard Montfalcon family. However, some authors regard it as a branch that settled in Geneva. The family name has at times been confused with Montfaucon in Franche-Comté, as well as with the title of Montfalcon in Dauphiné, which belonged to the de Brosses family.

== History ==
=== Origins and early members ===
Montfalcon is located in the present-day commune of La Biolle in Savoy.

The family owned the Château de Montfalcon (Mons Falconis), from which it derived its name. The castle occupied a strategic position controlling the road linking Annecy, in the Genevois region, to Chambéry in Savoy, passing through Albens and Rumilly, as well as the routes leading toward Lake Bourget. It served as the seat of a castellany that included the present-day communes of La Biolle, Albens, Saint-Germain-la-Chambotte, and Saint-Girod, along with the castles of Longefan, Flaxieu, and Vhitry.

The earliest known reference to the Montfalcon family dates to 1084, at the foundation of the priory of Saint-Innocent (Brison-Saint-Innocent) on Lake Bourget. This event records a donation made by “Gautier de Montfalcon, vir nobilis,” with the consent of his wife Bulgrade and their sons. In 1092 and 1112, Bonpair, son of Gautier and lord of Montfalcon, also made donations to the Abbey of Aulps in Chablais.

As vassals of the Counts of Maurienne, members of the family continued to appear in regional records; Willelme, a knight, is mentioned as a witness to Count Humbert III in a charter confirming privileges to the Charterhouse of Arvières in Bugey around 1149.

On January 12, 1252, Bernard Farguil de Montfalcon transferred his rights and properties of the lordship of Montfalcon to Béatrice of Savoy. By 1286, the House of Savoy had acquired rights over the lordship, while the Montfalcon family maintained possession of a fortified residence near the castle.

The family formed several branches: Montfalcon-Flaxieu (Bugey), Montfalcon-Roasson, Montfalcon-Saint-Pierre, and Montfalcon-Novalaise (Savoyard Bugey).

=== Flaxieu branch ===
The Flaxieu branch of the Montfalcon family originated in the 14th century with the acquisition of the lordship of Flaxieu near Belley in Bugey. Historian Andenmatten (2018) described this branch as being in a period of ascent, particularly due to its marriage alliances. Guillaume de Montfalcon’s marriage to Marguerite of the influential Chevron-Villette family facilitated the rise of their descendants to episcopal positions.

Genealogists Guichenon (1650) and La Chesnaye Des Bois (1869) proposed that the Montfalcon family of Bugey descended from Pierre de Montfalcon, knight and lord of Bourgoing in Dauphiné, who was allegedly a member of the Montfaucon family, Counts of Montbéliard, although both noted the lack of evidence supporting this claim.

=== Lordship of Cevins ===
In the 14th century, Emeric de Montfalcon married Bernarde de Cevins, the sole heiress of her line, who later appears to have married Ogier, the natural son of Count Aymon of Savoy, after 1364.

The title of Cevins passed through the marriage of Antoinette de Montfalcon, Lady of Cevins and Miolans, to Amédée de Crescherel (died before 1453). It later returned to the Montfalcon family when Charles-François de Montfalcon married Françoise Hyéronime Seyssel, Lady of Cevins, in 1683.

The lineage concluded when Françoise Hyéronime de Montfalcon de Saint-Pierre married Victor-Prosper de Carelly de Bassy in 1754, whose title of Count of Cevins lapsed during the French Revolution.

== Heraldry ==
The coat of arms of the Montfalcon family is blazoned as:

Quarterly 1 and 4 argent an eagle displayed sable, armed and beaked or; 2 and 3 ermine and gules.

== Titles ==
The lords of Montfalcon held the following titles at various periods:

- Counts of Cevins, of Saint-Pierre-de-Soucy;
- Barons of Montfalcon;
- Lords of Chitry (before 1480–1610, in Vallières), Cengle, Flaxieu, La Pesse, Mionaz, Montfalcon, Pierre-Charve, Rumilly, Sillans, Tessy;
- Co-lords of Roasson.

== Offices ==
Family members served as castellans of:

- Aiguebelle (1422–1434);
- Allinges-Neuf-Thonon and the fortified house of Bonnant (1490–1494, 1496–1497, 1499–1500, 1502–1504, 1508, 1511–1513, 1514–1515);
- Châtelard (1491–1511);
- Cordon (1352);
- Entremont (1356–1358);
- Évian and Féternes (1366–1372);
- Montfalcon (1479–1486);
- Montjoie (1368–1380);
- Samoëns (1355).

== Filiation ==
Genealogist Amédée de Foras detailed the complete lineage of the Montfalcon-Flaxieu family, along with the Montfalcon-Roasson and Montfalcon-Saint-Pierre branches, and also mentioned a branch established in Novalaise (Savoyard Bugey).

The Historical Dictionary of Switzerland states that the Montfalcon family established in Compesières originated from Novalaise but does not indicate a connection with the earlier branch. According to a genealogy compiled by Auguste de Montfalcon, the Compesières family descends from the Novalaise branch identified by de Foras.

According to Deonna (1928):

- Gaspard, noble.
  - François (1580–1660).
    - Pierre (died 1685), advisor and secretary to Prince Thomas of Savoy; died without issue.
    - Etienne, founder of the Novalaise branch.
    - Charles, founder of the Geneva branch.

Montfalcon de Flaxieu Branch:

- Henry de Montfalcon (c. 1370), knight, married N.N., acquiring the lordship of Flaxieu by marriage.
  - Anthoine, lord of Flaxieu, married Marguerite de Saleneuve.
    - Jeanne, married Antoine de Rivoire, knight.
  - François, knight, lord of Flaxieu, married Alix de Verboz; their children included:
    - Guillaume, knight, lord of Flaxieu, La Balme-sur-Assens (Valromey), and the Tower of Châtel, married Marguerite de Chevron-Villette. They had ten children, including:
      - Hugonin (died c. 1500), lord of Mécoras and Flaxieu, counselor and chamberlain to the Duke of Savoy, married Françoise de Menthon; their son:
        - François (tested 1524), baron of Flaxieu, lord of La Balme and Terreaux, married Philiberte de Lugny; died without issue.
      - Georges (tested 1512), lord of Terreaux, Prangin, Rochax, Silans, Fernex, bailiff of Bugey;
        - One daughter married Claude de Mareste, and he had two natural sons.
      - François, lord of Mécoras, married Jacqueline de Pierre-Charne de Rougemont, Lady of Pierre-Charne and La Rochette, acquiring La Pesse by marriage. Nine children included:
        - Pierre, lord of Pierre-Charne.
        - Jacques, lord of Rougemont.
        - Sébastien (1489–1560), bishop of Lausanne.
        - Pernette/Perronette, married Jean X de Blonay (Vaud branch).
        - Jeanne, married Ancelin de Montvuagnard, lord of Boëge.
        - Jeanne the Younger, married (1) Philibert de Clermont, lord of Vaulserre, (2) Méraut de Grolée, baron of Virville.
        - Claude, nun at Betton.
      - Louis, baron of Flaxieu, lord of Terreaux and Martignat, married Pernette de Montfalcon, Lady of Chitry. Four children included:
        - Marin (tested 1562), baron of Flaxieu, lord of Terreaux, Martignat, and Fernex, married Antoinette de Clermont; many descendants including:
          - Jacques, baron of Flaxieu.
            - Rolland-Claude, legitimized natural son, baron of Flaxieu, married (1) Claudine de Vignod, (2) Jeanne de Moyra.
          - Jean (died 1591), baron of Flaxieu, lord of Martignat, Chitry, and La Balme, governor of Savoy (1583), married Andréanne de Breuil; three daughters including:
        - Pierre-Marc, prior of Aiglefort.
        - Madeleine, nun.
    - François de Clermont, appointed heir, required to adopt the Montfalcon name.
      - Pierre, canon-count (?).
      - Aymon/Aimé (1443–1517), bishop of Lausanne, diplomat and poet.
      - Jean, canon of Belley.
      - Alix, married (1474) Claude, lord of Montferrand.
      - Catherine, married Guillaume de Mareste, knight.
    - Antoine, clergyman.
    - Jeanne, married Guillaume de La Balme, knight, lord of Terreaux (Valromey).

Geneva Branch:

- Charles de Montfalcon, farmer, married Elisabeth Morel; seven children included:
  - Louis (1759–1831), magistrate, married (1786) Jeanne-Marie Pacthod, sister of an Empire general.
    - Louis-Apollonie (1807–1872), lawyer, deputy to the Grand Council, and mayor of Compesières.
      - Johannès (1843–1891), politician, heir of the Montfalcon general.
  - Louis-Apollonie (1764–1840), military doctor.
  - Jean (1767–1845), French general during the Revolution and the Empire.

== Notable figures ==
=== Laity ===
- François Philibert de Montfalcon (died 1682), Count of Saint-Pierre, State Counselor, and First President of the Chamber of Accounts of Savoy (1624).
- Louis (1759–1831), magistrate.
- Louis-Apollonie (1764–1840), military doctor.
- Jean (1767–1845), French general during the Revolution and the Empire.

== Clergy ==
- Aymon de Montfalcon (1443–1517) was a Savoyard ecclesiastic, diplomat, and poet. He served as counselor to Duke Amadeus IX of Savoy, ambassador to Rome, advisor to Duchess Blanche of Montferrat, administrator of the Diocese of Geneva, and Bishop of Lausanne from 1491 to 1517. He also held the title of Prince of the Holy Roman Empire.
- Jean de Montfalcon (died 1553), Doctor of Law, canon of Geneva and prior of Lutry (1513), provost of the cathedral chapter of Geneva, then of Annecy (1531).
- Two canons of Lausanne: Jacques (1518) and Claude (1525).
- Sébastien de Montfalcon (1489–1560), Bishop of Lausanne (1517–1560).
- Pierre-Marie de Montfalcon, canon-count within the Chapter of Saint-Jean of Lyon (1788), Vicar General of Nîmes.

== See also ==
- History of Savoy

== Bibliography ==
- Deonna, Henry (1928). "Notice généalogique sur la famille de Montfalcon de Genève" [Genealogical note on the Montfalcon family of Geneva]. Archives héraldiques suisses (in French) (42): 31–32.
- Guichenon, Samuel (1650). "Montfalcon : Barons de Flaccieu, Seigneurs des Terreaux & de la Balme fur Affens" [Montfalcon: Barons of Flaccieu, Lords of Terreaux & La Balme fur Affens]. Histoire de Bresse et de Bugey (in French): 174–176.
- de Foras, Amédée (1900). Armorial et nobiliaire de l'ancien duché de Savoie [Armorial and nobility of the former Duchy of Savoy] (in French). Vol. 4. Grenoble: Allier Frères. pp. 91–108.
