= Aymon de Montfalcon =

Aymon de Montfalcon, sometimes spelled Aymon de Montfaucon, born in 1443 in Flaxieu, in the Bugey region of France, and died on August 10, 1517, in Lausanne, was both a high-ranking ecclesiastical figure, diplomat, and poet, descended from a branch of the Montfalcon family.

Ducal advisor to Amadeus IX, he became ambassador to Rome, advisor to Duchess Blanche of Montferrat, then administrator of the Bishopric of Geneva, Bishop of Lausanne from 1491 until his death, Count of Vaud, and Prince of the Holy Roman Empire.

== Biography ==
Aymon de Montfalcon was born in 1443. Descended from a branch of an old Savoyard family, he was the son of Guillaume de Montfalcon and Marguerite de Chevron-Villette. A Doctor of Canon Law, he became a Benedictine monk at Saint-Rambert in the Bugey region.

Close to the Dukes of Savoy, he served as advisor to Amadeus IX of Savoy, and later to Philibert I. Between 1495 and 1510, he served eight times as the ambassador of Savoy to the Swiss Confederates.

Upon the succession of Benoît de Montferrand—a relative by marriage—to the bishopric of Lausanne, he was the candidate put forward by the House of Savoy. Aymon was appointed Bishop of Lausanne on May 16, 1491, by Pope Innocent VIII.

He became commendatory prior of Port-Valais in 1492 and of Lutry in 1495. From 1497 to 1509, he served as administrator of the Diocese of Geneva on behalf of the underage Philippe of Savoy.

In 1493, he organized a diocesan synod in Lausanne, and in 1497, he founded the Carmelite convent of Sainte-Catherine du Jorat in Lausanne and the Franciscan convent in Morges. In 1508, Pope Julius II appointed him as apostolic investigating judge in the Jetzer affair.
