= Jetzer affair =

1507-1509 religious fraud case in Bern

Jetzer Affair
- Date: 1507–1509
- Location: Bern, Old Swiss Confederacy
- Also known as: Jetzerhandel
- Cause: Theological dispute over the Immaculate Conception
- Outcome: Execution of four Dominican friars
- Deaths: 4
- Suspects: Hans Jetzer, Johann Vatter, Franz Ueltschi, Stephan Boltzhurst, Heinrich Steinegger

The Jetzer Affair (German: Jetzerhandel) was a theological-political controversy that took place in Bern between 1507 and 1509. The affair centered on a series of fraudulent religious apparitions and miracles staged by four Dominican friars at their monastery in Bern, using a young lay brother named Hans Jetzer as an unwitting participant and later victim.

The scandal became entangled with one of the most contentious theological debates of the Late Middle Ages: the doctrine of the Immaculate Conception. The affair ultimately resulted in the execution of the four friars at the stake, though debate continues about the extent of Jetzer's complicity.

== Background ==
The affair takes its name from Johannes/Johann/Hans Jetzer (c. 1483 – c. 1514), a tailor's assistant from Zurzach who was admitted as a young lay brother to the Dominican monastery in Bern around 1507, at approximately 23 years of age. At the time, the Dominicans and Franciscans were engaged in a fierce theological dispute concerning the Immaculate Conception. The Franciscans supported the doctrine that the Virgin Mary had been conceived without original sin, while the Dominicans rejected this position, maintaining that Mary, like all humans except Jesus Christ, was born into original sin.

The controversy had intensified following the publication around 1490 of the Mariale by Italian Franciscan Bernardino de' Busti. In this work, Bernardino catalogued numerous miracles that he claimed supported the doctrine of the Immaculate Conception, affirming that innumerable miracles had supported, but none had refuted, the doctrine. This represented a significant challenge to the Dominican position.

According to trial records, a conspiracy to stage miraculous events in support of the Dominican position was conceived at a provincial chapter of the Dominican Order held in Wimpfen, Württemberg, in early May 1506. The city of Bern was selected for the scheme because the Dominicans believed it to be powerful, but its people also foolish. The plan was to use the young, credulous lay brother Jetzer as the instrument through whom these supposed miracles would be manifested.

== The staged apparitions ==
=== Initial visions ===
The supernatural events began in early 1507, shortly after Jetzer's admission to the monastery. Jetzer claimed to have been visited by the ghost of a former prior who had been dismissed 160 years earlier and subsequently died in a brawl in Paris. According to Jetzer's account, the ghost revealed that he had been condemned to purgatory, where he was joined by numerous Franciscans being punished for preaching the Immaculate Conception, and that the Dominicans who rejected this doctrine were on the righteous path. Whether Jetzer genuinely believed he experienced this vision or was already complicit with the friars at this early stage remains unclear from the historical record.

On the Feast of the Annunciation, in the night of 24 March 1507, Jetzer reported that the Virgin Mary herself appeared to him, accompanied by Saint Barbara, to whom Jetzer was particularly devoted. According to his account, Mary brought several reliquaries and imprinted the first stigmata on his right hand, promising that the remaining four wounds would follow within six weeks. Subsequent apparitions allegedly involved other saints, including Saint Cecilia, Catherine of Siena, and Bernard of Clairvaux.

=== The deception exposed ===
However, the monastery's superiors did not wait the promised six weeks before staging another miracle. In mid-April 1507, during what was meant to be another apparition, Jetzer witnessed a white communion wafer supposedly turn red in Mary's hand. At this crucial moment, Jetzer realized that the figures of Mary and two accompanying angels were actually the monastery's lector, Stephan Boltzhurst, the prior Johann Vatter, and the subprior Franz Ueltschi in disguise, standing on a movable beam operated from the neighboring cell by the steward, Heinrich Steinegger.

Jetzer responded with anger and disappointment upon discovering the deception. The lector Boltzhurst attempted to placate him, claiming they had merely wanted to test whether Jetzer could distinguish genuine apparitions from false ones, and insisted that the white wafer had indeed genuinely transformed into a bloody one; it was subsequently displayed for veneration on several occasions. At this point, Jetzer had become a serious risk to the conspirators, having uncovered their fraud. The friars subjected him to several unsuccessful poisoning attempts during this period.

=== Continued manipulation ===
Despite the exposure of their deception to Jetzer, the friars continued with their plan. In early May, the subprior gave Jetzer the remaining four stigmata. From that point forward, around midday every day, Jetzer performed a dramatic Passion Play under the influence of a draught administered by his superiors, which the entire city of Bern came to witness. Whether Jetzer participated willingly at this stage or was coerced through the poisoning attempts and manipulation by the friars remains a matter of historical debate.

== The weeping Madonna and prophecies ==
The monastery superiors escalated their scheme further. In the night of 24–25 June 1507, they painted bloody tears on the face of a Pietà statue in their church—a seated Virgin Mary holding her dead son. The friars claimed that Jesus had asked his mother why she was crying, to which she replied that she was distressed at being said to have been born without sin, when that honor belonged to her son alone. This dramatic event caused an uproar throughout the city.

The situation became even more politically charged one or two nights later when another prophecy was attributed to Mary. She supposedly declared that a great plague would befall Bern because the city's leaders, having foresworn the practice of supplying mercenaries to foreign rulers, were still accepting bribes for doing so. This prophecy excited the people of Bern considerably more than the theological question of Mary's conception.

At the end of July 1507, Jetzer's stigmata disappeared overnight, probably because the Bishop of Lausanne had announced his intention to have them examined by a doctor. The bloody wafer, still on display on 29 July 1507 when the Dominican church celebrated its saint's day, then became problematic. Since, according to Catholic teaching, it is the true body of Christ, it could not simply be discarded. The monastery superiors attempted to force Jetzer to swallow it, but when he resisted, the wafer fell and broke onto a chair, leaving a red mark. The friars then tried to burn the chair in a stove; the stove and the whole room reportedly exploded, an event that even the conspirators interpreted as a Eucharistic miracle.

The final staged apparition occurred on the night of 12 September 1507, when a crowned Virgin Mary was to appear above the rood screen in the Dominican church. The vision had been planned so that Jetzer could be entrapped, as he had overheard his superiors' conversations about the staging. He confronted the figure with a staff and knife but was prevented from grabbing and unmasking her. The city's governing Kleine Rat (Small Council) responded by having Jetzer arrested on 1 October 1507 and handed over to the Bishop of Lausanne for an inquisition.

== The trials ==
=== First trial: Jetzer alone (1507–1508) ===
The first trial took place in Lausanne and Bern during the winter of 1507–1508, with Hans Jetzer as the sole defendant. At this stage, the authorities believed Jetzer to be the primary perpetrator of the fraud. The Bishop of Lausanne, Aymon de Montfalcon, proceeded with considerable care, attempting to determine what heresy Jetzer had committed. He remained firm in the face of calls from the City of Bern to have Jetzer tortured.

However, the city leaders succeeded in bringing Jetzer back to Bern before year's end. In early February 1508, Jetzer was tortured several times. Under torture, he made accusations against his superiors at the monastery, implicating the prior Johann Vatter, the subprior Franz Ueltschi, the lector Stephan Boltzhurst, and the steward Heinrich Steinegger in staging the apparitions.

=== Main trial: The four friars (1508) ===
Unlike the lay brother Jetzer, the Dominican friars were full members of a religious order that was exempt from the authority of the bishop, so an extraordinary trial was required that needed papal approval. This main trial took place in Bern from 26 July to 7 September 1508, with Jetzer and the four monastery superiors as defendants. The judges were the Bishops of Lausanne and Sion—Aymon de Montfalcon and Matthäus Schiner—as well as Peter Sieber, Provincial of the Upper German Province of the Dominican Order.

Provincial Sieber attempted for as long as possible to prevent his fellow friars from being tortured, but when torture was finally decided, he resigned from the court. The torture began with the steward Heinrich Steinegger and subprior Franz Ueltschi, then moved on following their confessions to the prior Johann Vatter and the lector Stephan Boltzhurst. Although confessions obtained under torture must be treated with suspicion, what emerged was a coherent story from the five accused men (including Jetzer), who had been imprisoned separately since February 1508.

With Provincial Sieber having removed himself from the court, the defendants were also questioned about any complicity on the part of the Upper German Province. These interrogations revealed that the plan to engineer miracles supporting the doctrine of the Virgin Mary's original sin had indeed been conceived at the provincial chapter in Wimpfen in early May 1506. The city of Bern had been chosen because the Dominicans believed it powerful, but its people also foolish.

The main trial, however, did not reach a definitive verdict because the two bishops could not agree on the appropriate sentence. Montfalcon argued for life imprisonment for the Dominicans, while Schiner demanded the death penalty. Schiner's position was supported by Bern's city leaders, who had been criticized by the Dominicans as credulous and sharply criticized in the prophecy for their unreliability in matters of mercenary service.

=== Retrial and execution (1509) ===
The inconclusive end to the main trial necessitated obtaining permission from Pope Julius II for a retrial, which was held in Bern in May 1509. An Italian bishop, Achille de Grassi of Città di Castello, was brought in as presiding judge alongside the Bishops of Lausanne and Sion.

On 23 May 1509, the four Dominican friars were taken from the ecclesiastical court to a scaffold on Kreuzgasse, where they were stripped of their religious orders—defrocked—and handed over to the secular justice system. The charges against them included heresy, sacrilege, poisoning, idolatry (relating to Eucharistic fraud), and the practice of black magic. Critically, Jetzer was found not to be connected with these crimes, suggesting the court ultimately concluded he had been manipulated by the friars rather than being a willing conspirator. Toward the end of May, the secular court—likely the Kleine Rat—confirmed the death sentence against the friars. On 31 May 1509, Johann Vatter, Franz Ueltschi, Stephan Boltzhurst, and Heinrich Steinegger were burned alive at the Schwellenmatte in Bern. Jetzer, who had been banned for life, managed to escape from prison on 25 July 1509.

== Contemporary impact and Reformation ==
The Jetzer Affair caused a sensation among contemporaries not only in Bern but throughout the Confederation, as documented in the chronicles of Valerius Anshelm and Diebold Schilling. The affair also gained supraregional importance due to its connection to the broader controversy over the Immaculate Conception, reflected in the wide distribution of writings about the case, including printed works by Thomas Murner. The phenomena reported by Jetzer were probably inspired by Bernardino de' Busti's Mariale, in which the Italian Franciscan had claimed that innumerable miracles supported the doctrine of the Immaculate Conception.

During the Reformation, the affair re-entered public debate and was held up by the Reformed as a symbol of the depravity of monasticism in the Late Middle Ages. However, no direct connection can be established between this event and the adoption of the Reformation in Bern in 1528, particularly since members of the Bernese elite attempted in the 1510s to rehabilitate the Dominicans through substantial donations to the monastery church, including commissioning the Danse Macabre by Niklaus Manuel.

== The question of Jetzer's guilt ==
The question of Jetzer's role and guilt has been debated since the trials themselves. Until the end of the 19th century, the guilt of the four Dominican friars was not questioned. In 1897, German church historian Nikolaus Paulus revisited the available records and published what he termed a review of the case, alleging that the four Dominicans had been victims of judicial murder and pointing the finger of blame at the City of Bern. Paulus presented Jetzer as the sole guilty party, orchestrating the entire fraud himself. However, at that time only the records from Jetzer's first trial in Lausanne and Bern (winter 1507–1508) were known, so Paulus's "judicial review" was necessarily incomplete.

The records of all three Jetzer trials were not published until 1904 by Rudolf Steck, Professor of the New Testament at the University of Bern. Steck also described the verdict as judicial murder, but laid responsibility at the feet of the Pope. Subsequently, throughout the 20th century, treatments of Bernese history presented Jetzer as the sole guilty party, adhering largely to Paulus's thesis. However, this interpretation could not explain how an illiterate tailor's assistant could have staged all of the elaborate apparitions alone, particularly given their theological sophistication.

Recent scholarship has increasingly concluded that Jetzer was primarily a victim of the Dominican conspiracy rather than its mastermind. Several factors support this interpretation: the theological sophistication of the apparitions far exceeded what could be expected from someone of Jetzer's limited education and intellectual level; construction work was documented in the monastery buildings during this period (Jetzer's cell and an adjacent small room, as well as the prior's quarters), which would have been necessary for staging the mechanical apparitions; the phenomena were clearly inspired by Bernardino de' Busti's Mariale, which the illiterate Jetzer certainly had not read; and most tellingly, Jetzer is the only figure in the entire story and historical record who had nobody on his side. The fact that the 1509 retrial found Jetzer not guilty of the charges brought against the four friars further suggests that contemporary judges, who had access to all the evidence, concluded he had been manipulated rather than being the primary perpetrator.

In her 2022 book Warum Maria blutige Tränen weinte. Der Jetzerhandel und die Jetzerprozesse in Bern (1507-1509) (Why Mary Cried Bloody Tears: The Jetzer Affair and the Jetzer Trials in Bern, 1507–1509), published as part of the Monumenta Germaniae Historica series, historian Kathrin Utz Tremp offers a detailed examination of the affair.

== See also ==
- Immaculate Conception
- Dominican Order
- History of Bern

== Bibliography ==
- Steck, Rudolf (ed.): Die Akten des Jetzerprozesses nebst dem Defensorium, 1904.
- Günthart, Romy (ed.): Von den vier Ketzern. «Ein erdocht falsch history etlicher Prediger münch» und «Die war History von den vier ketzer prediger ordens». Edition und Kommentar, 2009.
- Descœudres, Georges; Utz Tremp, Kathrin: Bern, Französische Kirche, Ehemaliges Predigerkloster. Archäologische und historische Untersuchungen 1988-1990 zu Kirche und ehemaligen Konventgebäuden, 1993.
- Utz Tremp, Kathrin: "Bern", in: Helvetia Sacra, IV/5, 1999, pp. 285–324.
- Izbicki, Thomas M.: "The Immaculate Conception and ecclesiastical politics from the Council of Basel to the Council of Trent. The Dominicans and their foes", in: Archiv für Reformationsgeschichte, 96, 2005, pp. 145–170.
- Wehrli-Johns, Martina: "L'Immaculée Conception après le concile de Bâle dans les provinces dominicaines et franciscaines de Teutonie et de Saxe. Débats et iconographie", in: L'Atelier du Centre de recherches historiques, 10, 2012.
- Utz Tremp, Kathrin: Warum Maria blutige Tränen weinte. Der Jetzerhandel und die Jetzerprozesse in Bern (1507-1509), 2 vols., 2022.
