= Canton of Albertville-1 =

Coordinates: 45.67°N 6.39°E

The canton of Albertville-1 is an administrative division of the Savoie department, southeastern France. It was created at the French canton reorganisation which came into effect in March 2015. Its seat is in Albertville.

It consists of the following communes:

1. Albertville (partly)
2. Allondaz
3. La Bâthie
4. Cevins
5. Esserts-Blay
6. Mercury
7. Rognaix
8. Saint-Paul-sur-Isère
9. Tours-en-Savoie
