= Compesières Commandry =

Castle in Geneva, Switzerland

Coordinates: 46°09′07″N 6°07′14″E

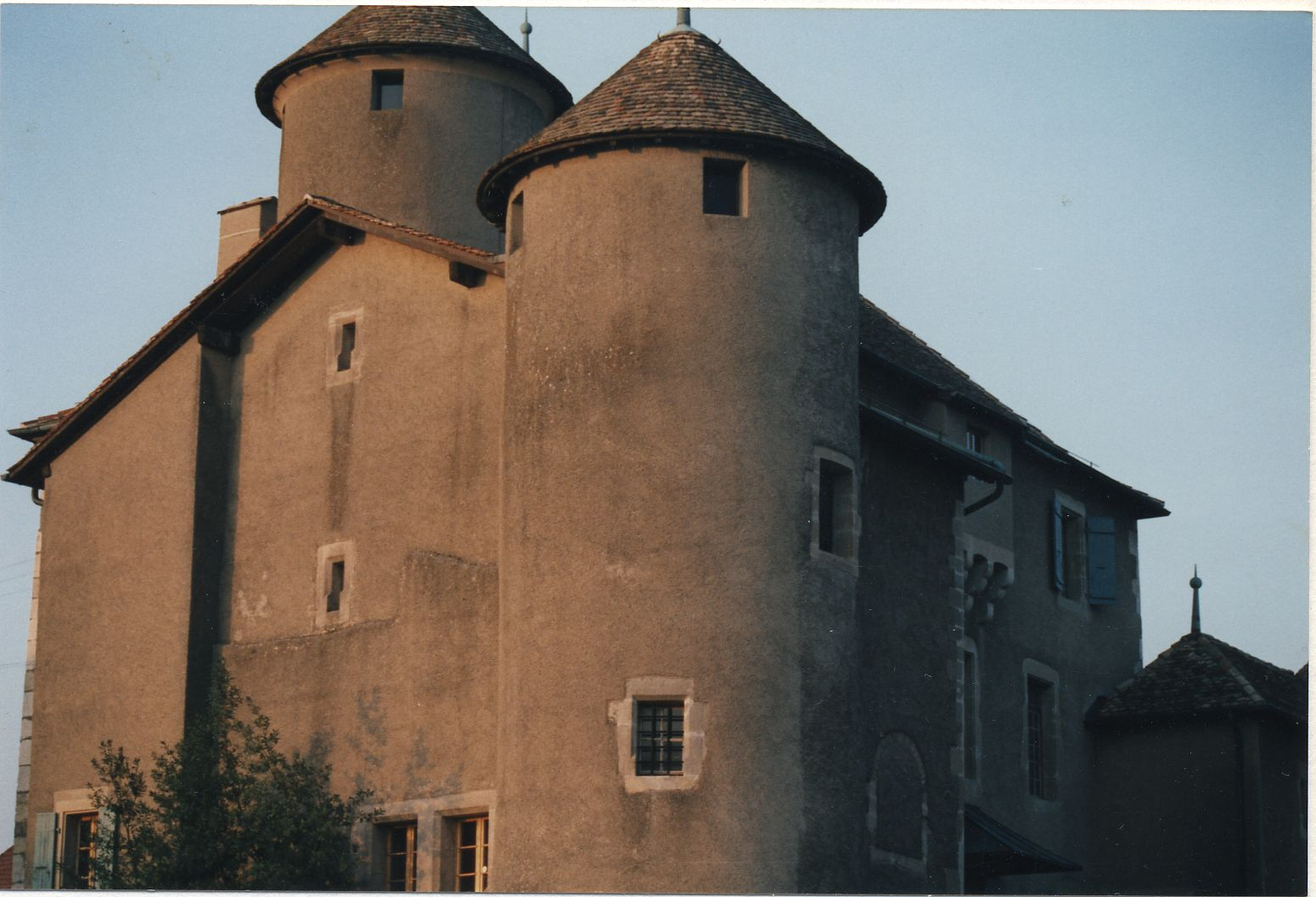
The Commandry

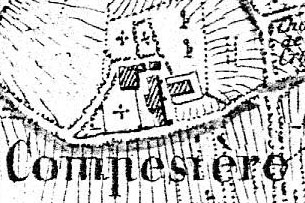
Plan of the Commandry in 1830

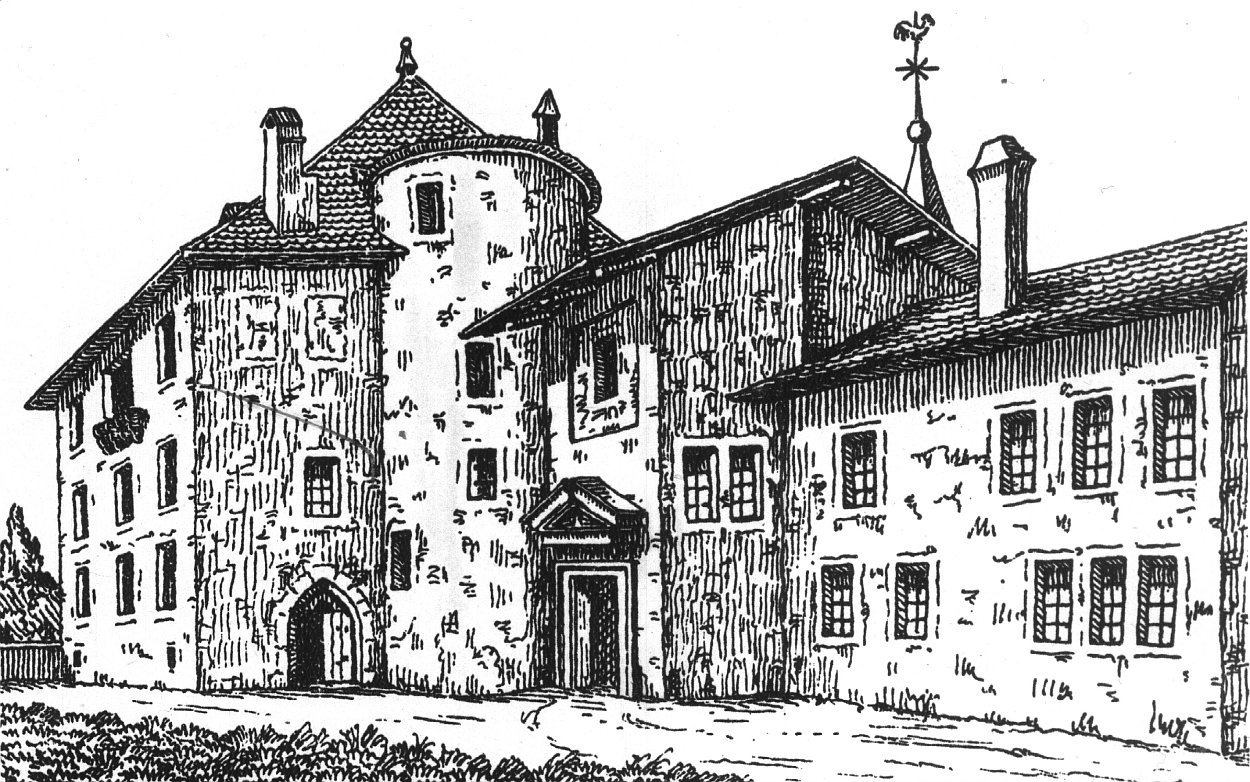
Drawing of the castle in 1840

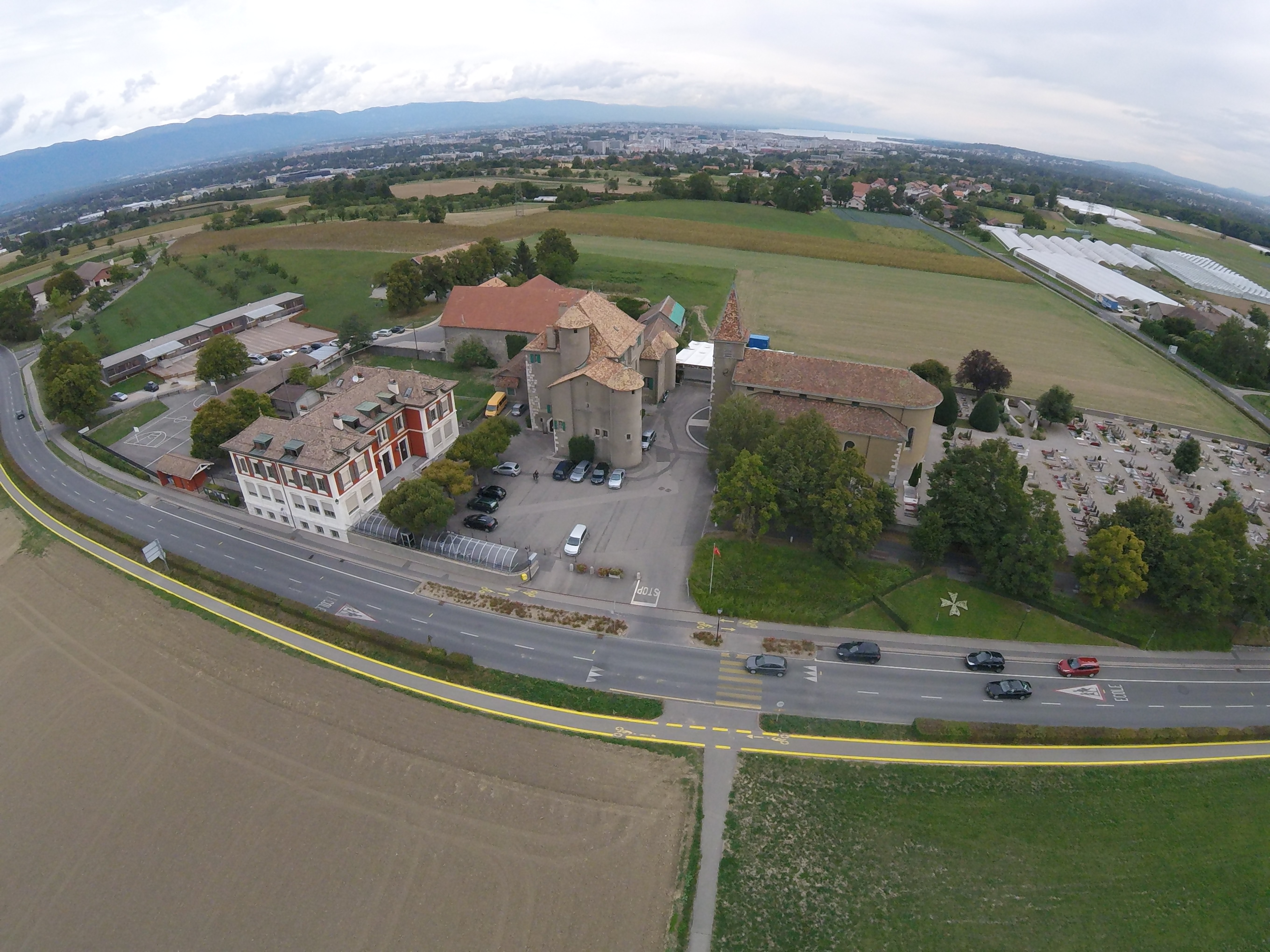
Compesières Commandry in 2015

Compesières Commandry, aerial video

The Compesières Commandry is the main Commandry of the Order of Malta in the Canton of Geneva in Switzerland. The Commandry is located in the municipality of Bardonnex.

== History ==
The village of Compesières existed since the 12th Century and was also mentioned as the family name of the local noble family. In 1270 the Bishop of Geneva, Aymo of Menthonay, granted the village church to the Order of Saint John. They then expanded the church into a Commandery. It is likely that the oldest parts of the castle date from this period. The current castle was built in the 15th Century. It was used by the Order as a hospice for pilgrims, hospital and a military saltpeter factory. In 1536, during the Protestant Reformation, the Commandry was stripped from the Order. The order returned to the castle in 1564, but it was held by the Protestant leaders of Geneva and Bern until a treaty between Geneva and Savoy returned it completely in 1598.

The order continued to hold the Commandry until the 1882, when it was transferred to the municipality of Bardonnex. In 1955, the municipality gave one of the rooms in the castle to the Order of Malta to build a museum.

== See also ==
- List of castles and fortresses in Switzerland
- Montfalcon family
