= Tournon, Savoie =

Tournon
- Commune
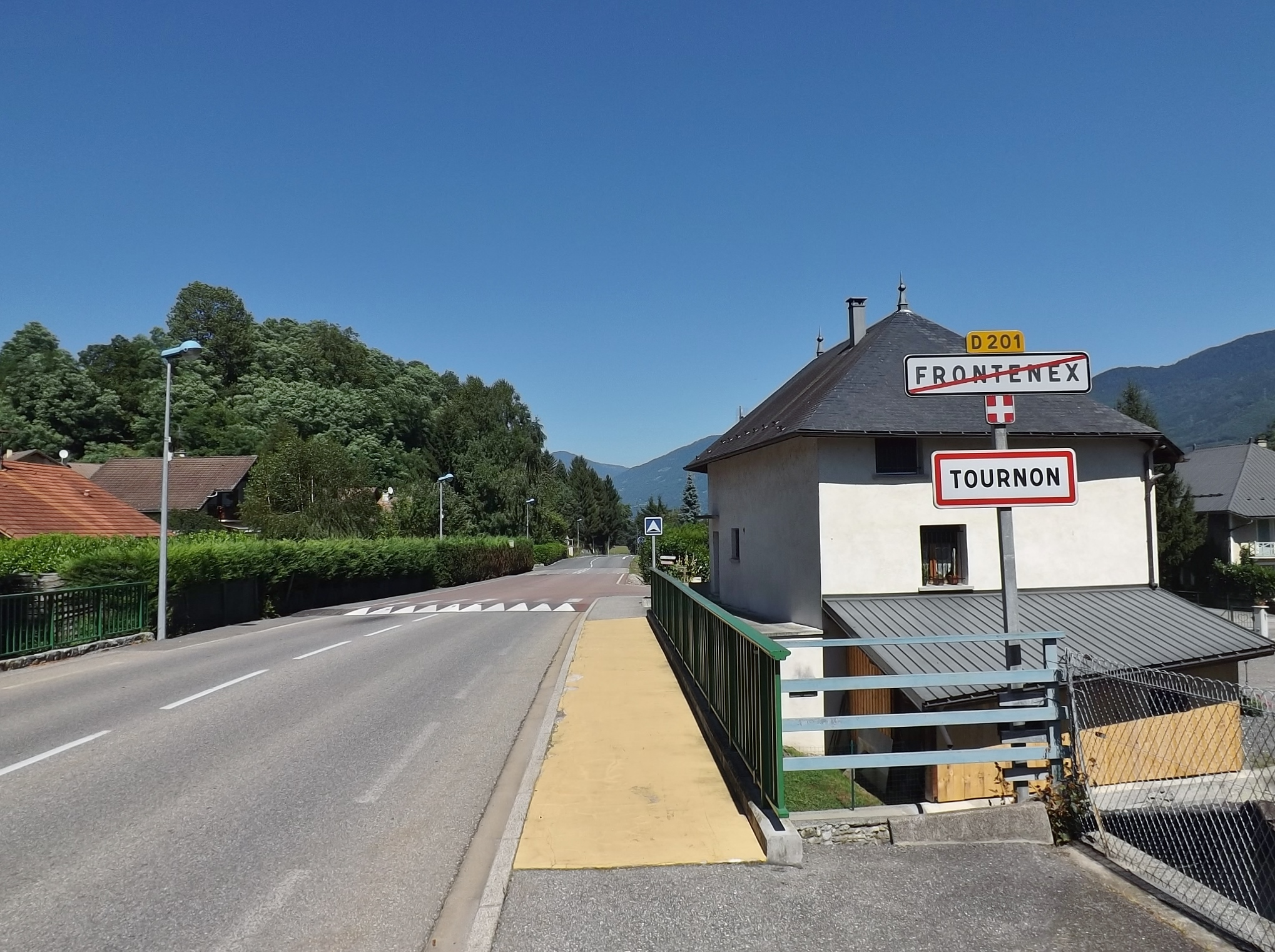
- The road into Tournon

- Coat of arms
- Location of Tournon
- Location within France Location within Auvergne-Rhône-Alpes
- Coordinates: 45°38′40″N 6°19′04″E
- Country: France
- Region: Auvergne-Rhône-Alpes
- Department: Savoie
- Arrondissement: Albertville
- Canton: Albertville-2
- Intercommunality: CA Arlysère

Government
  - Mayor (2020–2026): Sandrine Berthet
- Area^{1}: 4.86 km^{2} (1.88 sq mi)
- Highest elevation: 484 m (1,588 ft)
- Lowest elevation: 308 m (1,010 ft)
- Population (2023): 569
  - Density: 117/km^{2} (303/sq mi)
- Time zone: UTC+01:00 (CET)
  - Summer (DST): UTC+02:00 (CEST)
- INSEE/Postal code: 73297 /73460
- ^{1} French Land Register data, which excludes lakes, ponds, glaciers > 1 km^{2} (0.386 sq mi or 247 acres) and river estuaries.

Tournon (French pronunciation: [tuʁnɔ̃]) is a commune in the Savoie department in the Auvergne-Rhône-Alpes region in south-eastern France.

== See also ==
- Communes of the Savoie department
