= Sainte-Hélène-sur-Isère =

- Commune
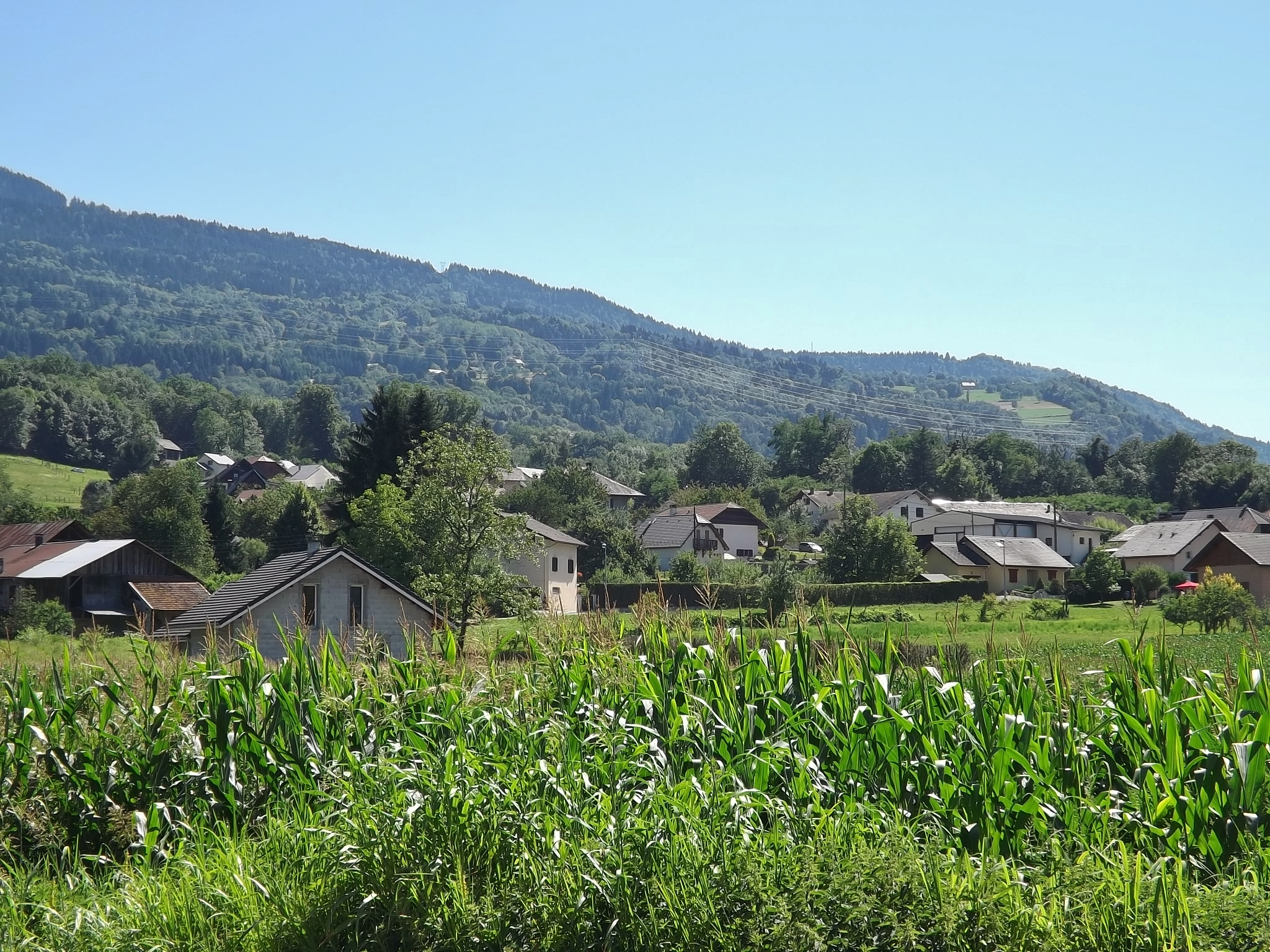
- A general view of Sainte-Hélène-sur-Isère

- Coat of arms
- Location of Sainte-Hélène-sur-Isère
- Location within France Location within Auvergne-Rhône-Alpes
- Coordinates: 45°36′52″N 6°19′18″E
- Country: France
- Region: Auvergne-Rhône-Alpes
- Department: Savoie
- Arrondissement: Albertville
- Canton: Albertville-2
- Intercommunality: CA Arlysère

Government
  - Mayor (2020–2026): Daniel Tavel
- Area^{1}: 14.43 km^{2} (5.57 sq mi)
- Highest elevation: 2,294 m (7,526 ft)
- Lowest elevation: 298 m (978 ft)
- Population (2023): 1,248
  - Density: 86.49/km^{2} (224.0/sq mi)
- Time zone: UTC+01:00 (CET)
  - Summer (DST): UTC+02:00 (CEST)
- INSEE/Postal code: 73241 /73460
- ^{1} French Land Register data, which excludes lakes, ponds, glaciers > 1 km^{2} (0.386 sq mi or 247 acres) and river estuaries.

Sainte-Hélène-sur-Isère (French pronunciation: [sɛ̃t elɛn syʁ izɛʁ], literally Sainte-Hélène on Isère) is a commune in the Savoie department in the Auvergne-Rhône-Alpes region in south-eastern France.

== See also ==
- Communes of the Savoie department
