= Plancherine =

- Commune
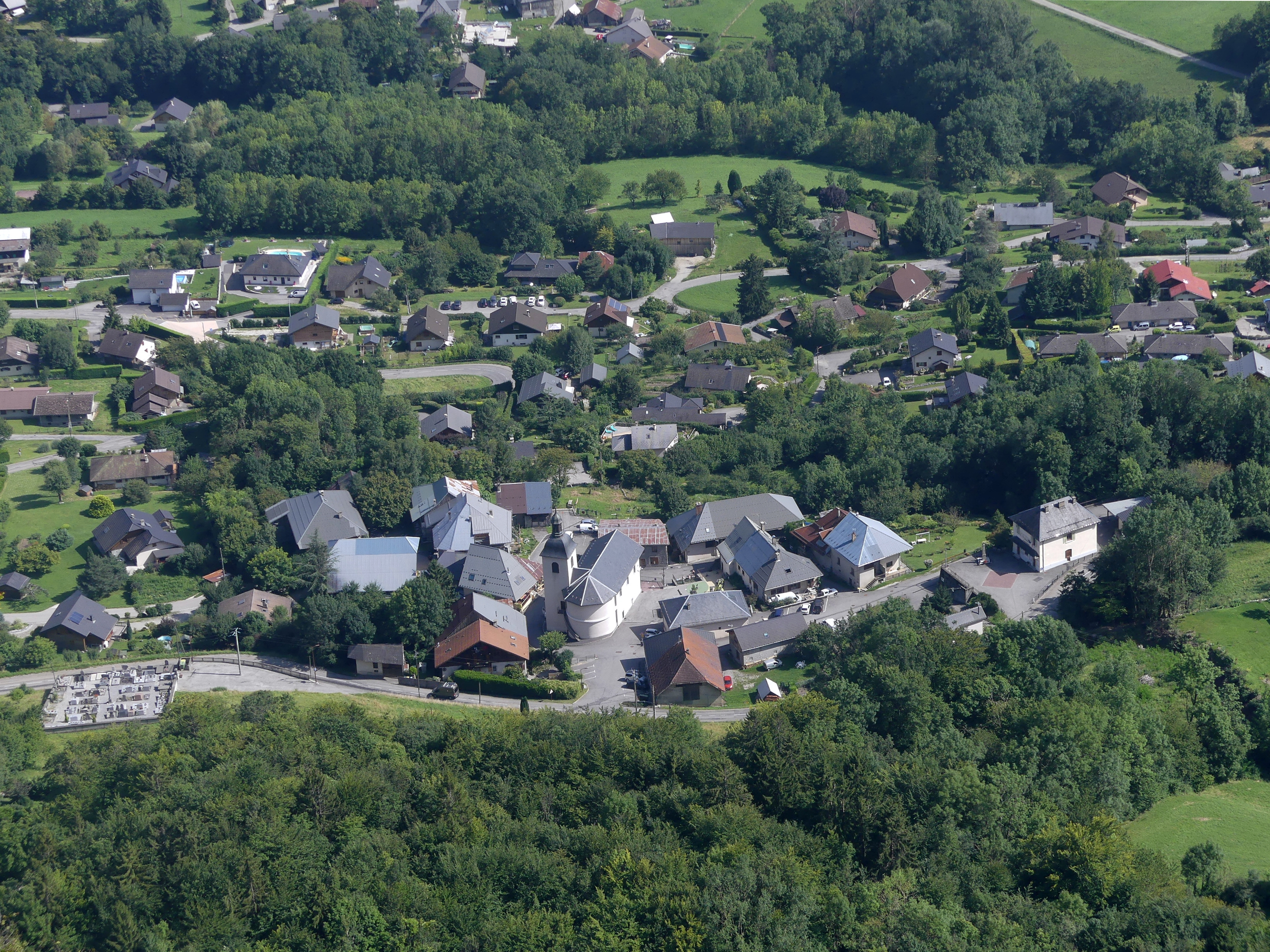
- The Abbey of Our Lady, in Tamié
- Location of Plancherine
- Location within France Location within Auvergne-Rhône-Alpes
- Coordinates: 45°39′57″N 6°19′02″E
- Country: France
- Region: Auvergne-Rhône-Alpes
- Department: Savoie
- Arrondissement: Albertville
- Canton: Albertville-2
- Intercommunality: CA Arlysère

Government
  - Mayor (2020–2026): Jean-Pierre Fazzari
- Area^{1}: 6.86 km^{2} (2.65 sq mi)
- Highest elevation: 2,173 m (7,129 ft)
- Lowest elevation: 440 m (1,440 ft)
- Population (2023): 471
  - Density: 68.7/km^{2} (178/sq mi)
- Time zone: UTC+01:00 (CET)
  - Summer (DST): UTC+02:00 (CEST)
- INSEE/Postal code: 73202 /73200
- Website: www.plancherine.fr
- ^{1} French Land Register data, which excludes lakes, ponds, glaciers > 1 km^{2} (0.386 sq mi or 247 acres) and river estuaries.

Plancherine (French pronunciation: [plɑ̃ʃʁin]; Arpitan: Plastarna) is a commune in the Savoie department in the Auvergne-Rhône-Alpes region in south-eastern France.

== See also ==
- Communes of the Savoie department
