= Montailleur =

- Commune
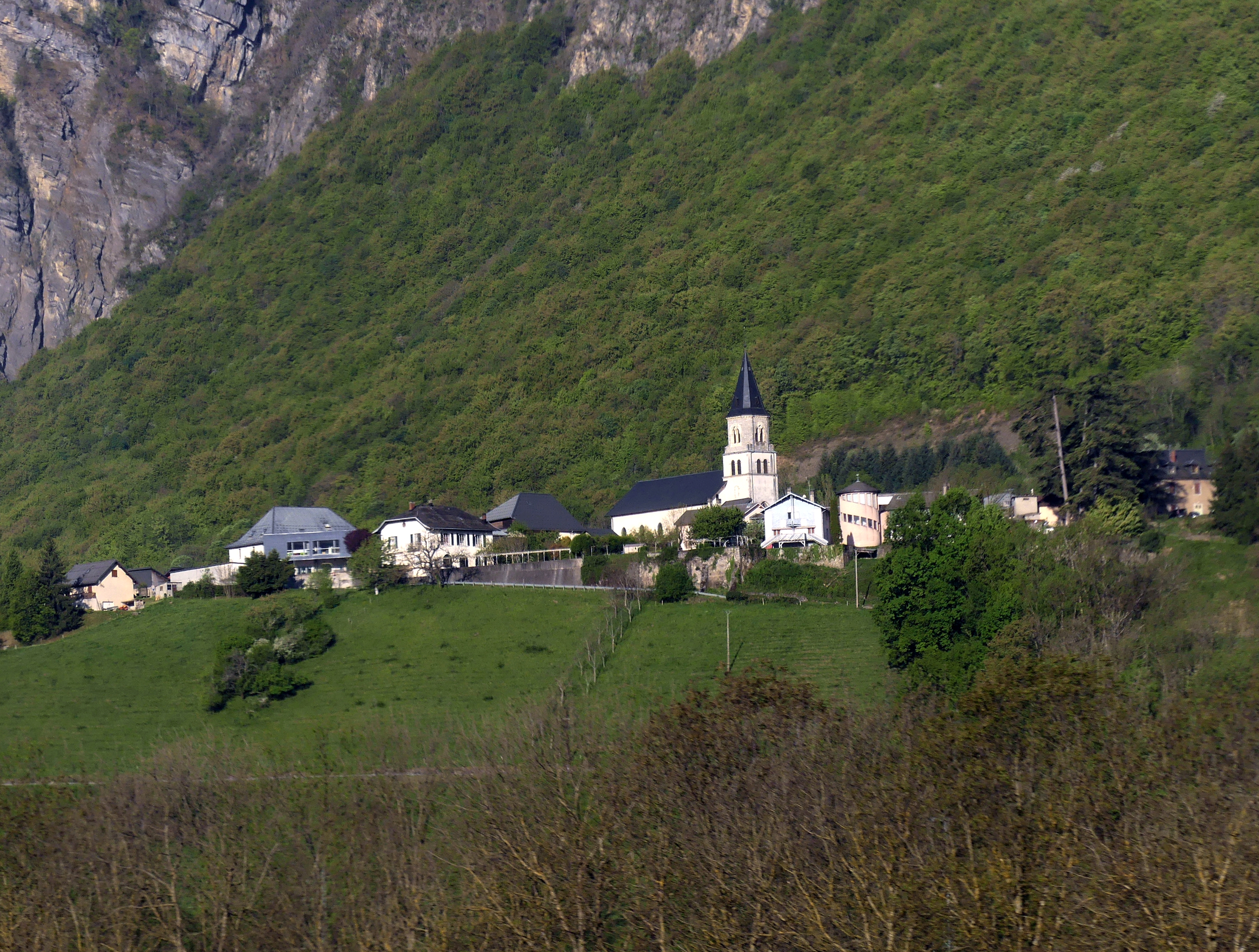
- Location of Montailleur
- Location within France Location within Auvergne-Rhône-Alpes
- Coordinates: 45°37′06″N 6°16′47″E
- Country: France
- Region: Auvergne-Rhône-Alpes
- Department: Savoie
- Arrondissement: Albertville
- Canton: Albertville-2
- Intercommunality: CA Arlysère

Government
  - Mayor (2020–2026): Jean-Claude Sibuet-Becquet
- Area^{1}: 15.3 km^{2} (5.9 sq mi)
- Highest elevation: 2,153 m (7,064 ft)
- Lowest elevation: 299 m (981 ft)
- Population (2023): 671
  - Density: 43.9/km^{2} (114/sq mi)
- Time zone: UTC+01:00 (CET)
  - Summer (DST): UTC+02:00 (CEST)
- INSEE/Postal code: 73162 /73460
- Website: www.montailleur.fr
- ^{1} French Land Register data, which excludes lakes, ponds, glaciers > 1 km^{2} (0.386 sq mi or 247 acres) and river estuaries.

Montailleur (French pronunciation: [mɔ̃tajœʁ]) is a commune in the Savoie department in the Auvergne-Rhône-Alpes region in south-eastern France.

== See also ==
- Communes of the Savoie department
