= Canton of Albertville-2 =

Coordinates: 45.67°N 6.38°E

The canton of Albertville-2 is an administrative division of the Savoie department, southeastern France. It was created at the French canton reorganisation which came into effect in March 2015. Its seat is in Albertville.

It consists of the following communes:

1. Albertville (partly)
2. Bonvillard
3. Cléry
4. Frontenex
5. Gilly-sur-Isère
6. Grésy-sur-Isère
7. Grignon
8. Montailleur
9. Monthion
10. Notre-Dame-des-Millières
11. Plancherine
12. Sainte-Hélène-sur-Isère
13. Saint-Vital
14. Tournon
15. Verrens-Arvey
