= Tours-en-Savoie =

- Commune
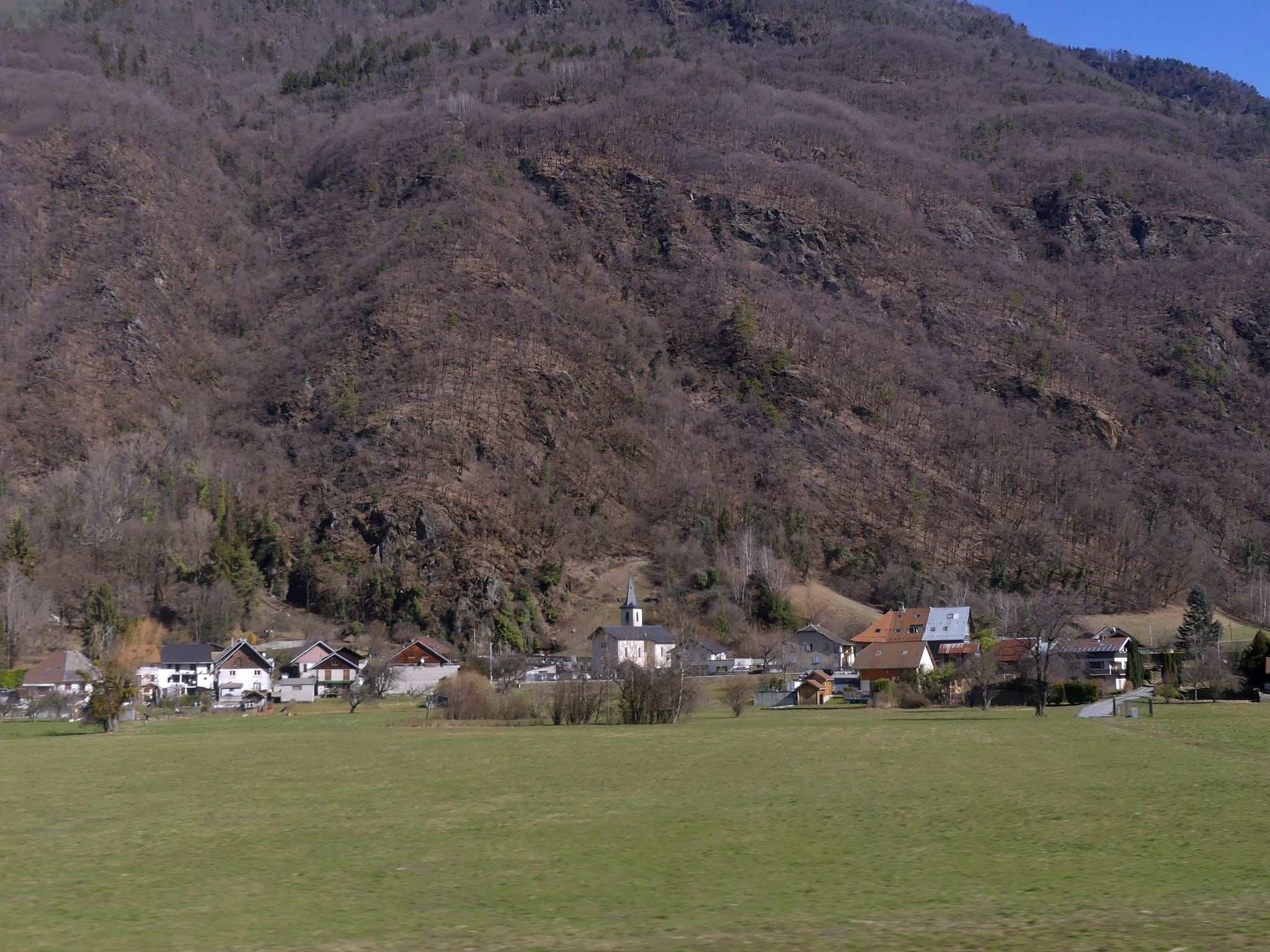

- Coat of arms
- Location of Tours-en-Savoie
- Location within France Location within Auvergne-Rhône-Alpes
- Coordinates: 45°39′22″N 6°26′27″E
- Country: France
- Region: Auvergne-Rhône-Alpes
- Department: Savoie
- Arrondissement: Albertville
- Canton: Albertville-1
- Intercommunality: CA Arlysère

Government
  - Mayor (2020–2026): Yann Mandret
- Area^{1}: 15.37 km^{2} (5.93 sq mi)
- Highest elevation: 2,440 m (8,010 ft)
- Lowest elevation: 343 m (1,125 ft)
- Population (2023): 945
  - Density: 61.5/km^{2} (159/sq mi)
- Time zone: UTC+01:00 (CET)
  - Summer (DST): UTC+02:00 (CEST)
- INSEE/Postal code: 73298 /73790
- ^{1} French Land Register data, which excludes lakes, ponds, glaciers > 1 km^{2} (0.386 sq mi or 247 acres) and river estuaries.

Tours-en-Savoie (French pronunciation: [tuʁ ɑ̃ savwa]; Arpitan: Tornon) is a commune in the Savoie department in the Auvergne-Rhône-Alpes region in south-eastern France.

== See also ==
- Communes of the Savoie department
