= La Bâthie =

- Commune
- Coat of arms
- Location of La Bâthie
- Location within France Location within Auvergne-Rhône-Alpes
- Coordinates: 45°37′40″N 6°27′01″E
- Country: France
- Region: Auvergne-Rhône-Alpes
- Department: Savoie
- Arrondissement: Albertville
- Canton: Albertville-1
- Intercommunality: CA Arlysère

Government
  - Mayor (2024–2026): Jean-Pierre André
- Area^{1}: 22.45 km^{2} (8.67 sq mi)
- Highest elevation: 2,460 m (8,070 ft)
- Lowest elevation: 346 m (1,135 ft)
- Population (2023): 2,176
  - Density: 96.93/km^{2} (251.0/sq mi)
- Demonym: Bathiolains
- Time zone: UTC+01:00 (CET)
  - Summer (DST): UTC+02:00 (CEST)
- INSEE/Postal code: 73032 /73540
- Website: www.labathie.fr
- ^{1} French Land Register data, which excludes lakes, ponds, glaciers > 1 km^{2} (0.386 sq mi or 247 acres) and river estuaries.

La Bâthie (French pronunciation: [la bati]) is a commune in the Savoie department in the Auvergne-Rhône-Alpes region in south-eastern France.

== Population ==
Historical population
Year	Pop.	±% p.a.
1968	1,690	—
1975	1,744	+0.45%
1982	1,791	+0.38%
1990	1,880	+0.61%
1999	2,022	+0.81%
2007	2,115	+0.56%
2012	2,110	−0.05%
2017	2,194	+0.78%
2023	2,176	−0.14%
Source: INSEE

== See also ==
- Communes of the Savoie department
