= Esserts-Blay =

- Commune
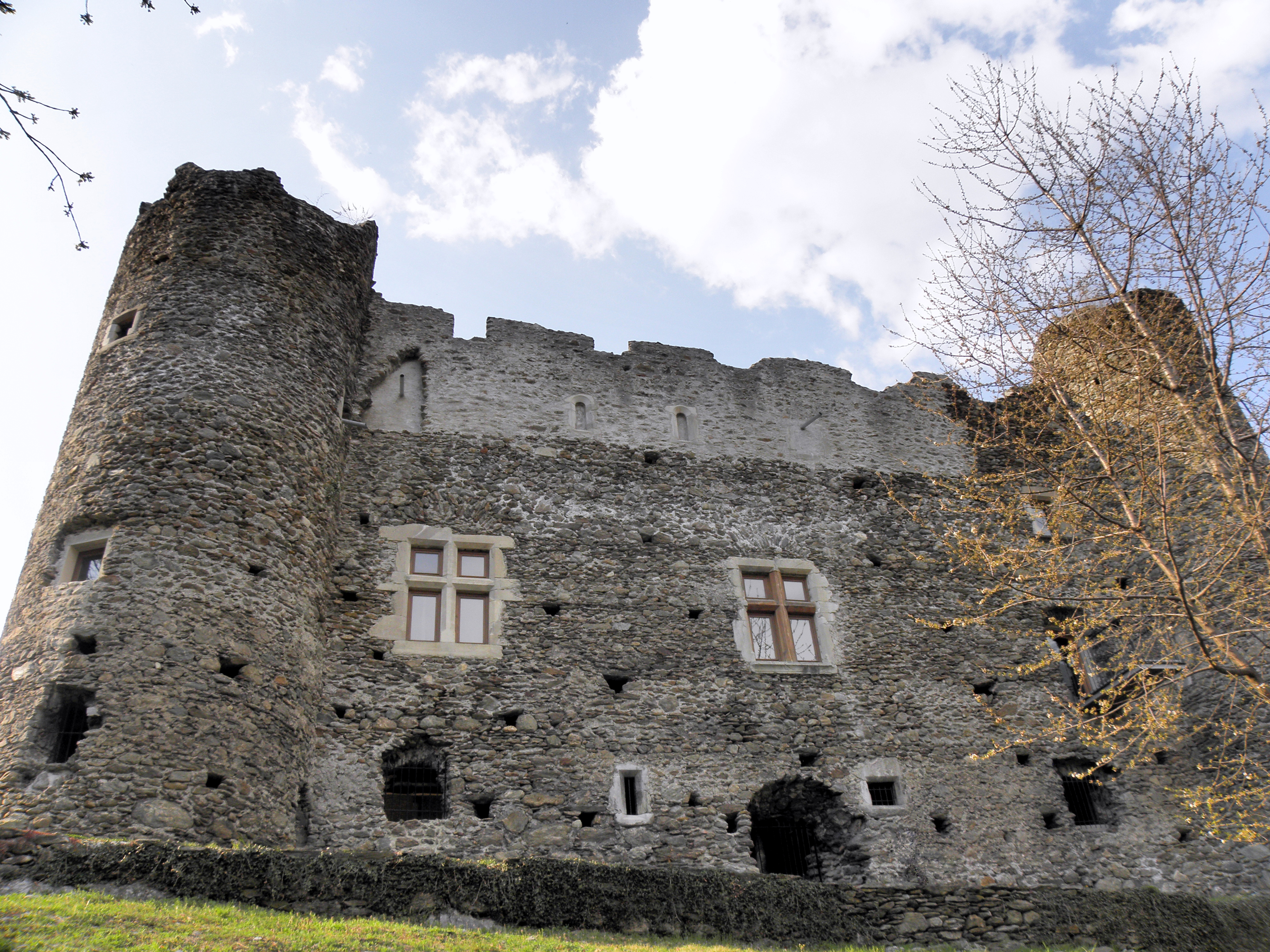
- The Manor of Blay

- Coat of arms
- Location of Esserts-Blay
- Location within France Location within Auvergne-Rhône-Alpes
- Coordinates: 45°36′50″N 6°26′11″E
- Country: France
- Region: Auvergne-Rhône-Alpes
- Department: Savoie
- Arrondissement: Albertville
- Canton: Albertville-1
- Intercommunality: CA Arlysère

Government
  - Mayor (2020–2026): Raphaël Thévenon
- Area^{1}: 15.51 km^{2} (5.99 sq mi)
- Highest elevation: 2,080 m (6,820 ft)
- Lowest elevation: 345 m (1,132 ft)
- Population (2023): 755
  - Density: 48.7/km^{2} (126/sq mi)
- Time zone: UTC+01:00 (CET)
  - Summer (DST): UTC+02:00 (CEST)
- INSEE/Postal code: 73110 /73540
- Website: www.essertsblay.com
- ^{1} French Land Register data, which excludes lakes, ponds, glaciers > 1 km^{2} (0.386 sq mi or 247 acres) and river estuaries.

Esserts-Blay (French pronunciation: [esɛʁ blɛ]; Arpitan: Blé) is a commune in the Savoie department in the Auvergne-Rhône-Alpes region in south-eastern France.

== See also ==
- Communes of the Savoie department
