= Gilly-sur-Isère =

Gilly-sur-Isère Zèlyé (Savoyard)
- Commune
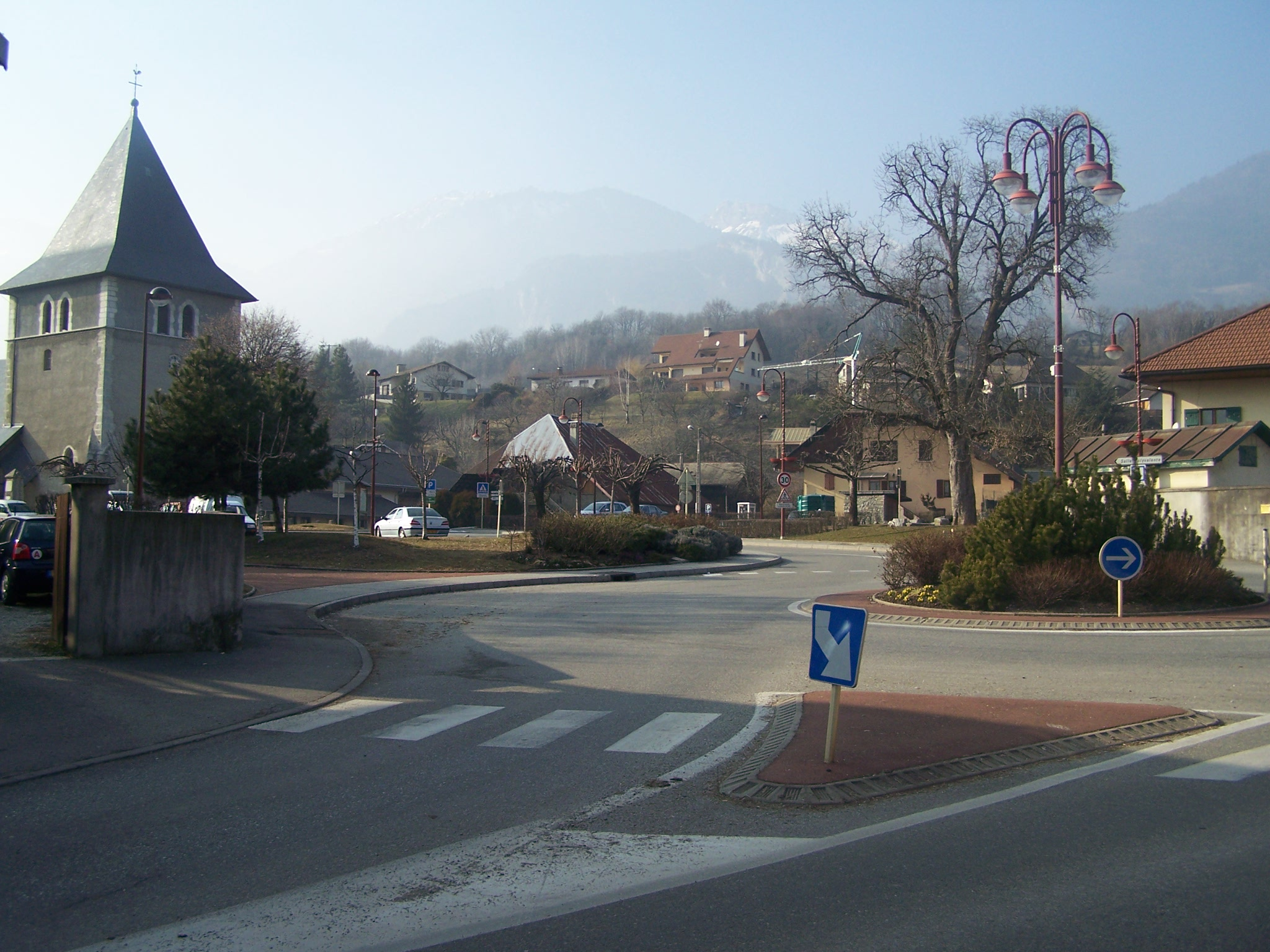
- The centre of Gilly-sur-Isère

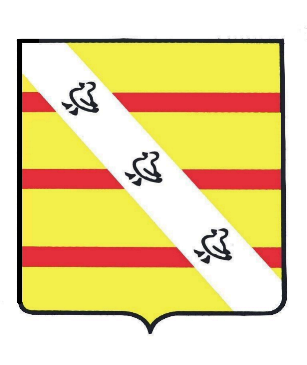
- Coat of arms
- Location of Gilly-sur-Isère
- Location within France Location within Auvergne-Rhône-Alpes
- Coordinates: 45°39′38″N 6°21′00″E
- Country: France
- Region: Auvergne-Rhône-Alpes
- Department: Savoie
- Arrondissement: Chambéry
- Canton: Albertville-2
- Intercommunality: CA Arlysère

Government
  - Mayor (2020–2026): Pierre Loubet
- Area^{1}: 7.03 km^{2} (2.71 sq mi)
- Highest elevation: 444 m (1,457 ft)
- Lowest elevation: 318 m (1,043 ft)
- Population (2023): 3,149
  - Density: 448/km^{2} (1,160/sq mi)
- Time zone: UTC+01:00 (CET)
  - Summer (DST): UTC+02:00 (CEST)
- INSEE/Postal code: 73124 /73200
- Website: www.gilly.fr
- ^{1} French Land Register data, which excludes lakes, ponds, glaciers > 1 km^{2} (0.386 sq mi or 247 acres) and river estuaries.

Gilly-sur-Isère (French pronunciation: [ʒili syʁ izɛʁ], literally Gilly on Isère; Savoyard: Zèlyé) is a commune in the Savoie department in the Auvergne-Rhône-Alpes region in south-eastern France.

Gilly-sur-Isere is situated at the edge of Albertville to the bottom of the Combe de Savoie where you can access the valleys of Maurienne and Tarentaise and the valley of Arly and Beaufortain.

== Geography ==
=== Climate ===
Gilly-sur-Isère has an oceanic climate (Köppen climate classification Cfb). The average annual temperature in Gilly-sur-Isère is 11.4 °C (52.5 °F). The average annual rainfall is 1,353.7 mm (53.30 in) with December as the wettest month. The temperatures are highest on average in July, at around 20.7 °C (69.3 °F), and lowest in January, at around 1.7 °C (35.1 °F). The highest temperature ever recorded in Gilly-sur-Isère was 39.0 °C (102.2 °F) on 13 August 2003; the coldest temperature ever recorded was −24.0 °C (−11.2 °F) on 6 January 1985.

Climate data for Gilly-sur-Isère (1991−2020 normals, extremes 1982−2020)
Month	Jan	Feb	Mar	Apr	May	Jun	Jul	Aug	Sep	Oct	Nov	Dec	Year
Record high °C (°F)	16.9 (62.4)	23.0 (73.4)	26.2 (79.2)	29.6 (85.3)	31.1 (88.0)	36.0 (96.8)	38.3 (100.9)	39.0 (102.2)	33.2 (91.8)	29.8 (85.6)	23.3 (73.9)	19.6 (67.3)	39.0 (102.2)
Mean daily maximum °C (°F)	6.3 (43.3)	8.8 (47.8)	14.1 (57.4)	18.0 (64.4)	21.8 (71.2)	25.4 (77.7)	27.5 (81.5)	27.1 (80.8)	22.7 (72.9)	17.7 (63.9)	10.9 (51.6)	6.5 (43.7)	17.2 (63.0)
Daily mean °C (°F)	1.7 (35.1)	3.3 (37.9)	7.8 (46.0)	11.3 (52.3)	15.3 (59.5)	18.9 (66.0)	20.7 (69.3)	20.5 (68.9)	16.4 (61.5)	12.0 (53.6)	6.1 (43.0)	2.3 (36.1)	11.4 (52.5)
Mean daily minimum °C (°F)	−2.8 (27.0)	−2.1 (28.2)	1.5 (34.7)	4.5 (40.1)	8.7 (47.7)	12.3 (54.1)	14.0 (57.2)	13.8 (56.8)	10.2 (50.4)	6.2 (43.2)	1.2 (34.2)	−1.9 (28.6)	5.5 (41.9)
Record low °C (°F)	−24.0 (−11.2)	−19.0 (−2.2)	−10.5 (13.1)	−4.3 (24.3)	−1.4 (29.5)	0.8 (33.4)	4.9 (40.8)	3.4 (38.1)	−1.4 (29.5)	−6.0 (21.2)	−15.0 (5.0)	−16.0 (3.2)	−24.0 (−11.2)
Average precipitation mm (inches)	135.9 (5.35)	105.8 (4.17)	108.0 (4.25)	92.7 (3.65)	109.1 (4.30)	104.8 (4.13)	100.3 (3.95)	107.5 (4.23)	97.3 (3.83)	109.0 (4.29)	125.5 (4.94)	157.8 (6.21)	1,353.7 (53.30)
Average precipitation days (≥ 1.0 mm)	10.2	8.5	9.6	9.1	11.8	10.6	9.5	9.4	9.1	10.3	10.4	11.1	119.8
Source: Météo-France

== Population ==
Historical population
Year	Pop.	±% p.a.
1968	1,008	—
1975	1,349	+4.25%
1982	1,829	+4.44%
1990	2,320	+3.02%
1999	2,457	+0.64%
2007	2,798	+1.64%
2012	2,868	+0.50%
2017	3,013	+0.99%
2023	3,149	+0.74%
Source: INSEE

== See also ==
- Communes of the Savoie department
