= La Pesse =

Commune in Bourgogne-Franche-Comté, France

- Commune
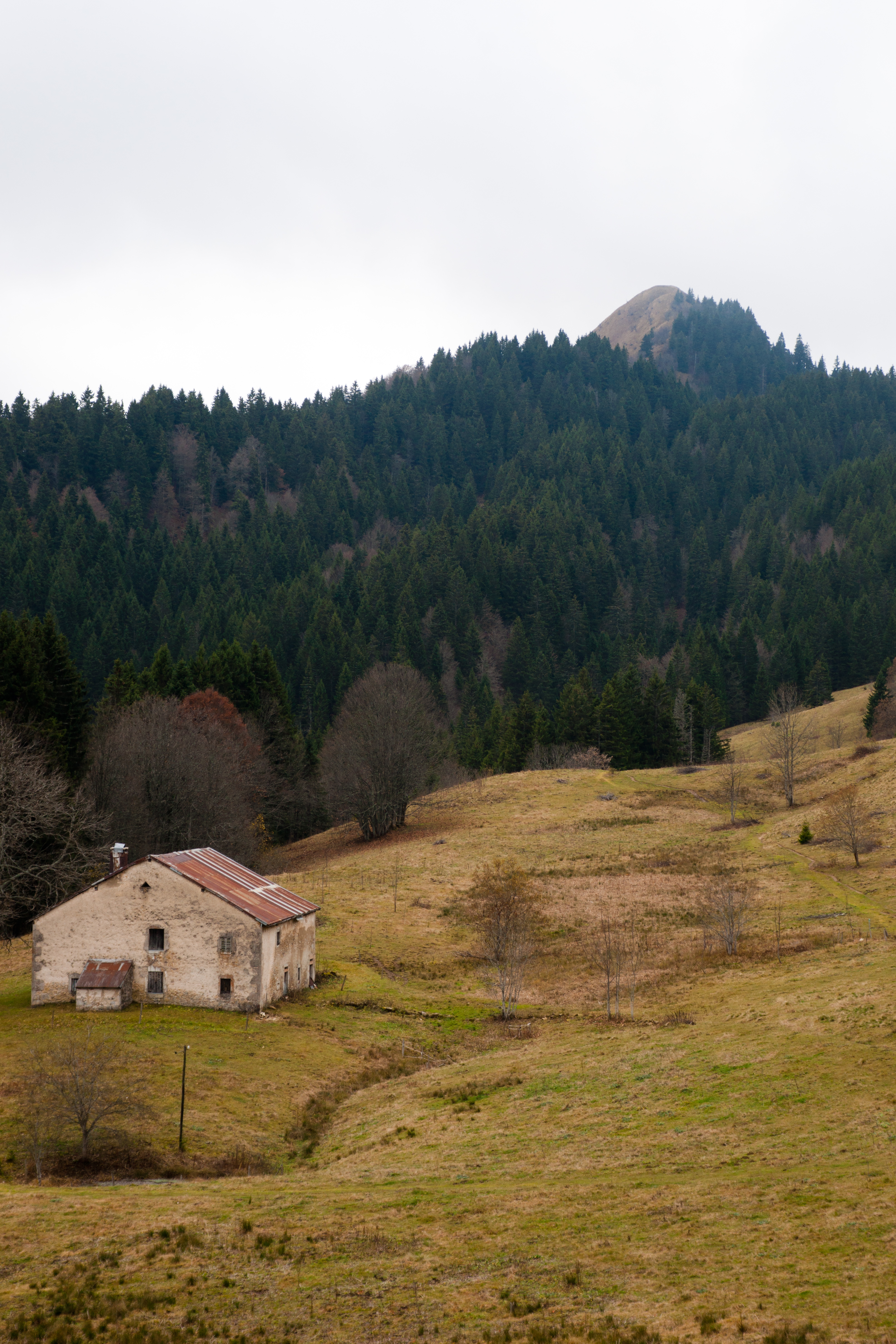
- Crêt de Chalam

- Coat of arms
- Location of La Pesse
- Location within France Location within Bourgogne-Franche-Comté
- Coordinates: 46°17′11″N 5°50′54″E
- Country: France
- Region: Bourgogne-Franche-Comté
- Department: Jura
- Arrondissement: Saint-Claude
- Canton: Coteaux du Lizon

Government
  - Mayor (2020–2026): Claude Mercier
- Area^{1}: 24.26 km^{2} (9.37 sq mi)
- Highest elevation: 1,440 m (4,720 ft)
- Lowest elevation: 800 m (2,600 ft)
- Population (2023): 334
  - Density: 13.8/km^{2} (35.7/sq mi)
- Time zone: UTC+01:00 (CET)
  - Summer (DST): UTC+02:00 (CEST)
- INSEE/Postal code: 39413 /39370
- ^{1} French Land Register data, which excludes lakes, ponds, glaciers > 1 km^{2} (0.386 sq mi or 247 acres) and river estuaries.

La Pesse (French pronunciation: [la pɛs]; Arpitan: l'Épicéa) is a commune in the Jura department in Bourgogne-Franche-Comté in eastern France.

== Climate ==
Climate data for La Pesse (1991−2020 normals, 1996−2024 extremes): 1133m
Month	Jan	Feb	Mar	Apr	May	Jun	Jul	Aug	Sep	Oct	Nov	Dec	Year
Record high °C (°F)	17.3 (63.1)	18.8 (65.8)	21.0 (69.8)	22.6 (72.7)	27.2 (81.0)	32.8 (91.0)	33.5 (92.3)	32.8 (91.0)	28.5 (83.3)	26.3 (79.3)	19.7 (67.5)	15.3 (59.5)	33.5 (92.3)
Mean daily maximum °C (°F)	3.0 (37.4)	3.2 (37.8)	6.8 (44.2)	10.6 (51.1)	14.3 (57.7)	17.9 (64.2)	20.0 (68.0)	19.9 (67.8)	16.1 (61.0)	12.3 (54.1)	6.7 (44.1)	3.7 (38.7)	11.2 (52.2)
Daily mean °C (°F)	−0.6 (30.9)	−0.8 (30.6)	2.5 (36.5)	6.0 (42.8)	9.7 (49.5)	13.4 (56.1)	15.1 (59.2)	15.0 (59.0)	11.5 (52.7)	8.2 (46.8)	3.1 (37.6)	0.1 (32.2)	6.9 (44.5)
Mean daily minimum °C (°F)	−4.2 (24.4)	−4.7 (23.5)	−1.7 (28.9)	1.3 (34.3)	5.1 (41.2)	8.5 (47.3)	10.1 (50.2)	10.1 (50.2)	6.8 (44.2)	4.1 (39.4)	−0.6 (30.9)	−3.4 (25.9)	2.6 (36.7)
Record low °C (°F)	−18.3 (−0.9)	−23.4 (−10.1)	−20.4 (−4.7)	−10.5 (13.1)	−4.0 (24.8)	−2.2 (28.0)	1.9 (35.4)	1.0 (33.8)	−1.6 (29.1)	−12.1 (10.2)	−15.2 (4.6)	−20.6 (−5.1)	−23.4 (−10.1)
Average precipitation mm (inches)	118.8 (4.68)	104.1 (4.10)	116.1 (4.57)	130.5 (5.14)	166.0 (6.54)	144.6 (5.69)	151.3 (5.96)	145.4 (5.72)	121.4 (4.78)	157.5 (6.20)	158.2 (6.23)	146.0 (5.75)	1,659.9 (65.36)
Source: Meteociel

Climate data for La Pesse (1981–2010 averages): elevation 1133m
Month	Jan	Feb	Mar	Apr	May	Jun	Jul	Aug	Sep	Oct	Nov	Dec	Year
Mean daily maximum °C (°F)	3.0 (37.4)	3.1 (37.6)	6.2 (43.2)	9.9 (49.8)	14.3 (57.7)	18.0 (64.4)	19.4 (66.9)	19.2 (66.6)	15.4 (59.7)	11.9 (53.4)	5.9 (42.6)	3.0 (37.4)	10.8 (51.4)
Daily mean °C (°F)	−0.7 (30.7)	−0.8 (30.6)	2.1 (35.8)	5.4 (41.7)	9.8 (49.6)	13.2 (55.8)	14.6 (58.3)	14.5 (58.1)	11.0 (51.8)	8.0 (46.4)	2.4 (36.3)	−0.5 (31.1)	6.6 (43.9)
Mean daily minimum °C (°F)	−4.4 (24.1)	−4.7 (23.5)	−2 (28)	0.9 (33.6)	5.4 (41.7)	8.4 (47.1)	9.8 (49.6)	9.8 (49.6)	6.6 (43.9)	4.0 (39.2)	−1.2 (29.8)	−4 (25)	2.4 (36.3)
Average precipitation mm (inches)	104.9 (4.13)	101.9 (4.01)	119.4 (4.70)	131.7 (5.19)	161.6 (6.36)	139.1 (5.48)	148.4 (5.84)	172.5 (6.79)	131.0 (5.16)	167.9 (6.61)	163.7 (6.44)	131.4 (5.17)	1,673.5 (65.88)
Source: Meteociel

== Population ==
Historical population
Year	Pop.	±% p.a.
1968	275	—
1975	210	−3.78%
1982	232	+1.43%
1990	245	+0.68%
1999	263	+0.79%
2007	334	+3.03%
2012	343	+0.53%
2017	343	+0.00%
2023	334	−0.44%
Source: INSEE

== See also ==
- Communes of the Jura department
