= Saint-Paul-sur-Isère =

- Commune
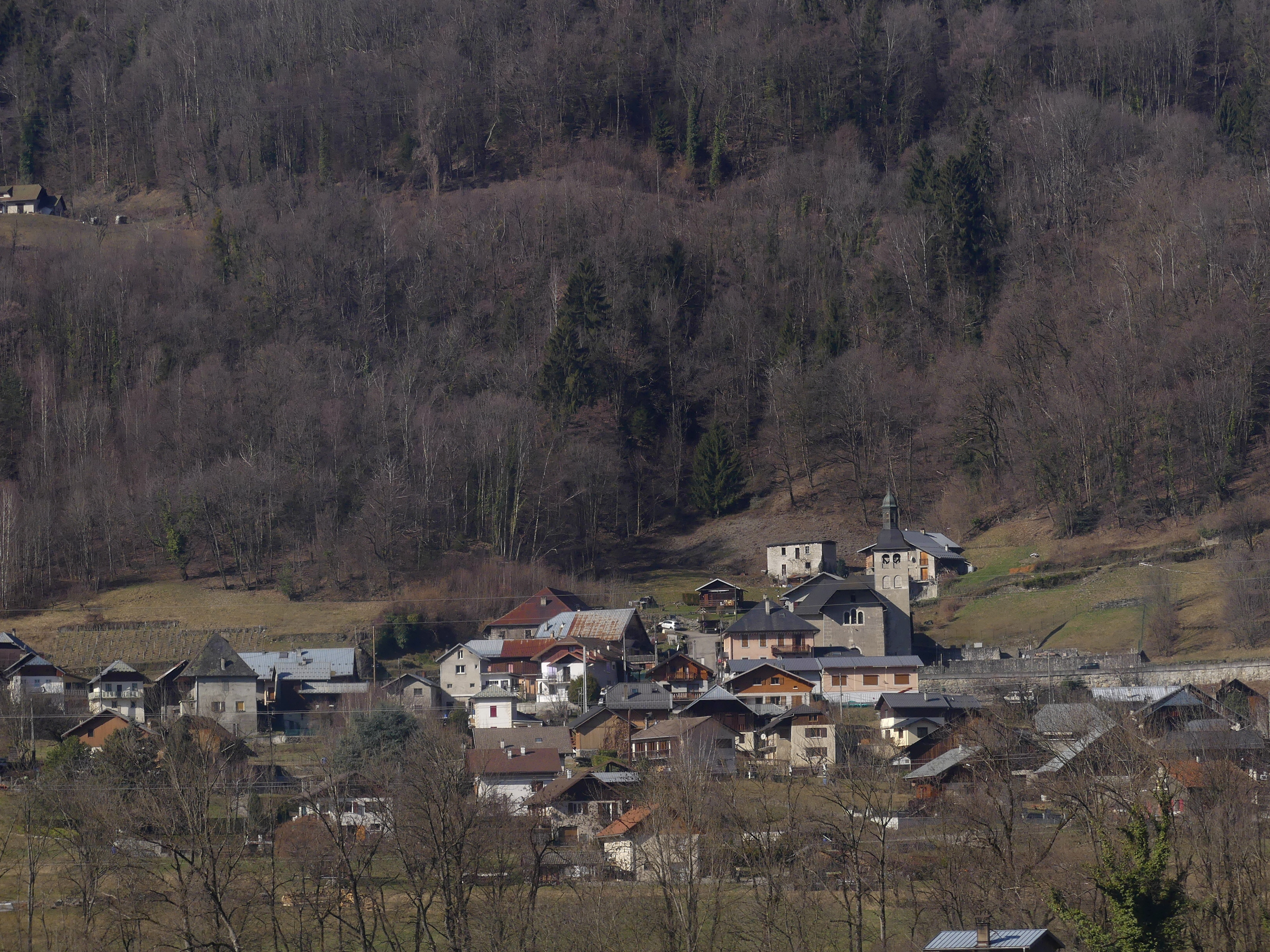

- Coat of arms
- Location of Saint-Paul-sur-Isère
- Location within France Location within Auvergne-Rhône-Alpes
- Coordinates: 45°35′55″N 6°26′21″E
- Country: France
- Region: Auvergne-Rhône-Alpes
- Department: Savoie
- Arrondissement: Albertville
- Canton: Albertville-1
- Intercommunality: CA Arlysère

Government
  - Mayor (2021–2026): Véronique Avrillier
- Area^{1}: 20.93 km^{2} (8.08 sq mi)
- Highest elevation: 2,480 m (8,140 ft)
- Lowest elevation: 365 m (1,198 ft)
- Population (2023): 543
  - Density: 25.9/km^{2} (67.2/sq mi)
- Time zone: UTC+01:00 (CET)
  - Summer (DST): UTC+02:00 (CEST)
- INSEE/Postal code: 73268 /73730
- ^{1} French Land Register data, which excludes lakes, ponds, glaciers > 1 km^{2} (0.386 sq mi or 247 acres) and river estuaries.

Saint-Paul-sur-Isère (French pronunciation: [sɛ̃ pɔl syʁ izɛʁ], literally Saint-Paul on Isère; Arpitan: Sin Pou) is a commune in the Savoie department in the Auvergne-Rhône-Alpes region in south-eastern France.

== See also ==
- Communes of the Savoie department
