= Grignon, Savoie =

Grignon
- Commune
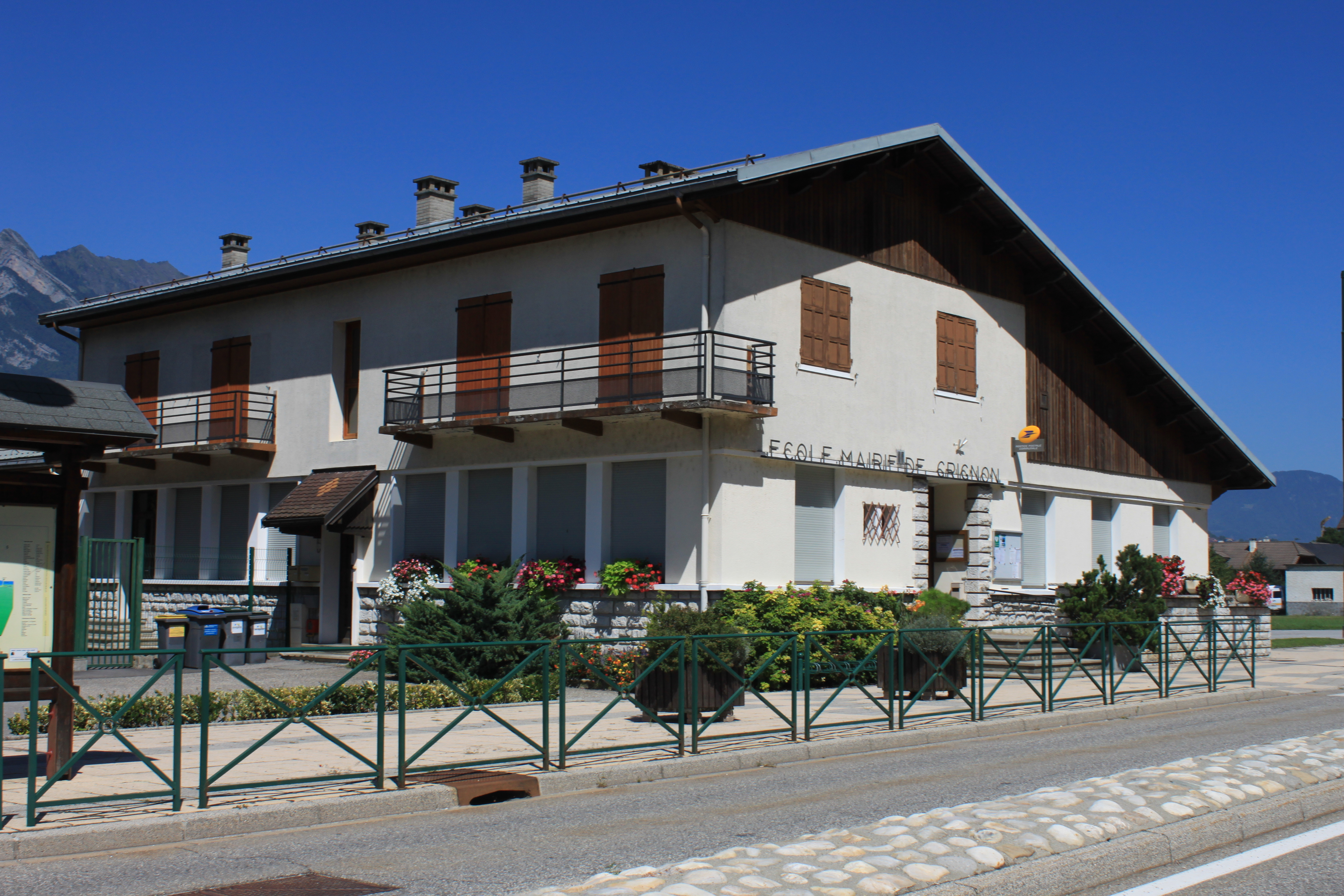
- The town hall in Grignon
- Location of Grignon
- Location within France Location within Auvergne-Rhône-Alpes
- Coordinates: 45°39′10″N 6°22′36″E
- Country: France
- Region: Auvergne-Rhône-Alpes
- Department: Savoie
- Arrondissement: Albertville
- Canton: Albertville-2
- Intercommunality: CA Arlysère

Government
  - Mayor (2020–2026): François Rieu
- Area^{1}: 9.29 km^{2} (3.59 sq mi)
- Highest elevation: 1,661 m (5,449 ft)
- Lowest elevation: 324 m (1,063 ft)
- Population (2023): 2,099
  - Density: 226/km^{2} (585/sq mi)
- Time zone: UTC+01:00 (CET)
  - Summer (DST): UTC+02:00 (CEST)
- INSEE/Postal code: 73130 /73200
- ^{1} French Land Register data, which excludes lakes, ponds, glaciers > 1 km^{2} (0.386 sq mi or 247 acres) and river estuaries.

Grignon (French pronunciation: [ɡʁiɲɔ̃]; Arpitan: Gregnon) is a commune in the Savoie department in the Auvergne-Rhône-Alpes region in south-eastern France. It is part of the urban area of Albertville.

== Population ==
Historical population
Year	Pop.	±% p.a.
1968	904	—
1975	1,113	+3.02%
1982	1,373	+3.04%
1990	1,610	+2.01%
1999	1,688	+0.53%
2007	1,960	+1.89%
2012	1,958	−0.02%
2017	2,119	+1.59%
2023	2,099	−0.16%
Source: INSEE

== See also ==
- Communes of the Savoie department
