= Rognaix =

- Commune
- Coat of arms
- Location of Rognaix
- Location within France Location within Auvergne-Rhône-Alpes
- Coordinates: 45°35′10″N 6°26′48″E
- Country: France
- Region: Auvergne-Rhône-Alpes
- Department: Savoie
- Arrondissement: Albertville
- Canton: Albertville-1
- Intercommunality: CA Arlysère

Government
  - Mayor (2021–2026): Patrice Burdet
- Area^{1}: 8.98 km^{2} (3.47 sq mi)
- Highest elevation: 2,080 m (6,820 ft)
- Lowest elevation: 381 m (1,250 ft)
- Population (2023): 479
  - Density: 53.3/km^{2} (138/sq mi)
- Time zone: UTC+01:00 (CET)
  - Summer (DST): UTC+02:00 (CEST)
- INSEE/Postal code: 73216 /73730
- Website: www.rognaix.fr
- ^{1} French Land Register data, which excludes lakes, ponds, glaciers > 1 km^{2} (0.386 sq mi or 247 acres) and river estuaries.

Rognaix is a commune in the Savoie department in the Auvergne-Rhône-Alpes region in south-eastern France.

== See also ==
- Communes of the Savoie department
