= Cevins =

- Commune
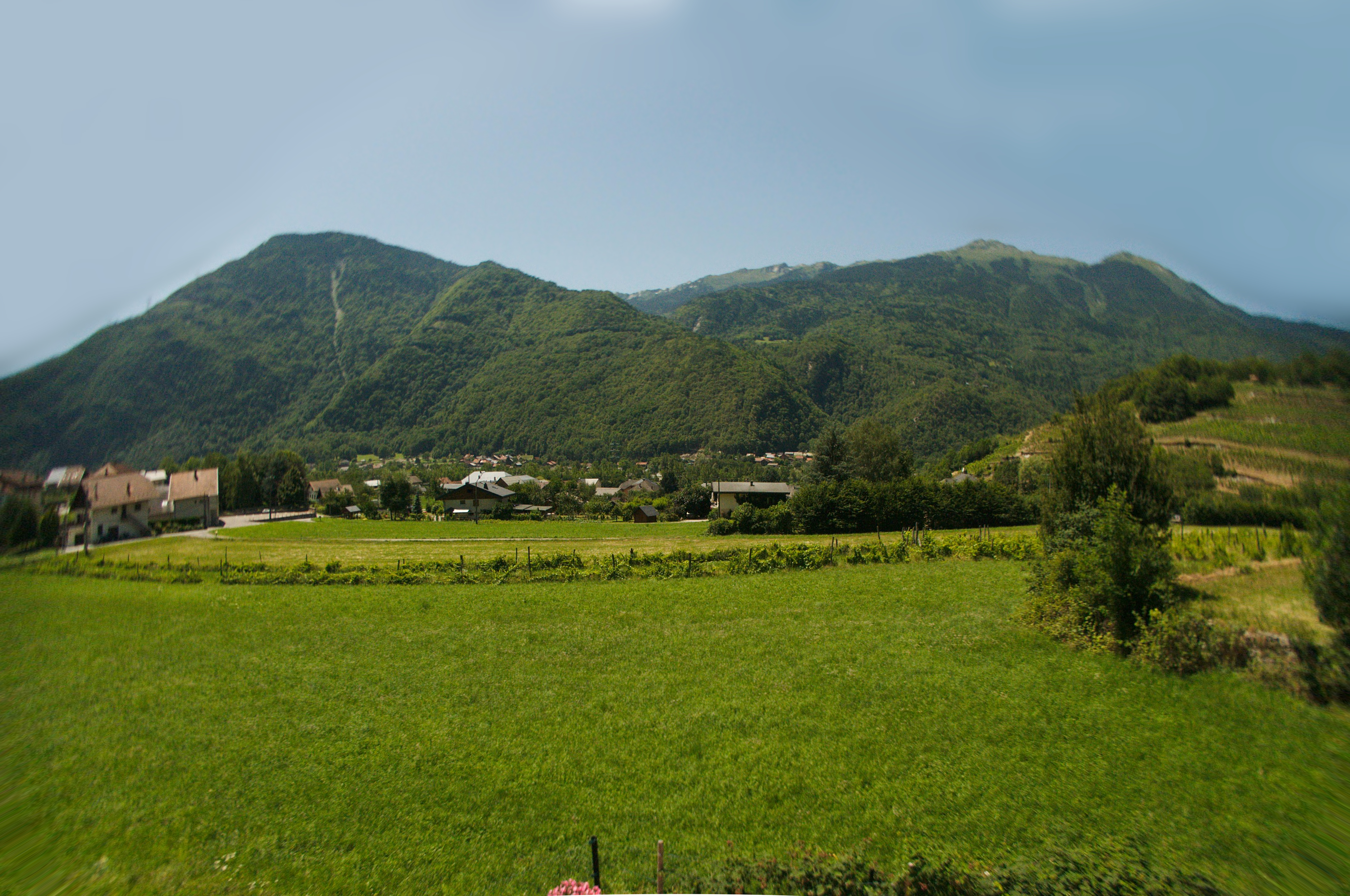
- A general view of Cevins
- Location of Cevins
- Location within France Location within Auvergne-Rhône-Alpes
- Coordinates: 45°35′32″N 6°27′25″E
- Country: France
- Region: Auvergne-Rhône-Alpes
- Department: Savoie
- Arrondissement: Albertville
- Canton: Albertville-1
- Intercommunality: CA Arlysère

Government
  - Mayor (2020–2026): Philippe Branche
- Area^{1}: 32.66 km^{2} (12.61 sq mi)
- Highest elevation: 2,680 m (8,790 ft)
- Lowest elevation: 375 m (1,230 ft)
- Population (2023): 706
  - Density: 21.6/km^{2} (56.0/sq mi)
- Demonym: Cévinois
- Time zone: UTC+01:00 (CET)
  - Summer (DST): UTC+02:00 (CEST)
- INSEE/Postal code: 73063 /73730
- ^{1} French Land Register data, which excludes lakes, ponds, glaciers > 1 km^{2} (0.386 sq mi or 247 acres) and river estuaries.

Cevins is a commune in the Savoie department in the Auvergne-Rhône-Alpes region in south-eastern France.

== See also ==
- Communes of the Savoie department
