= Flaxieu =

Commune in Auvergne-Rhône-Alpes, France

- Commune
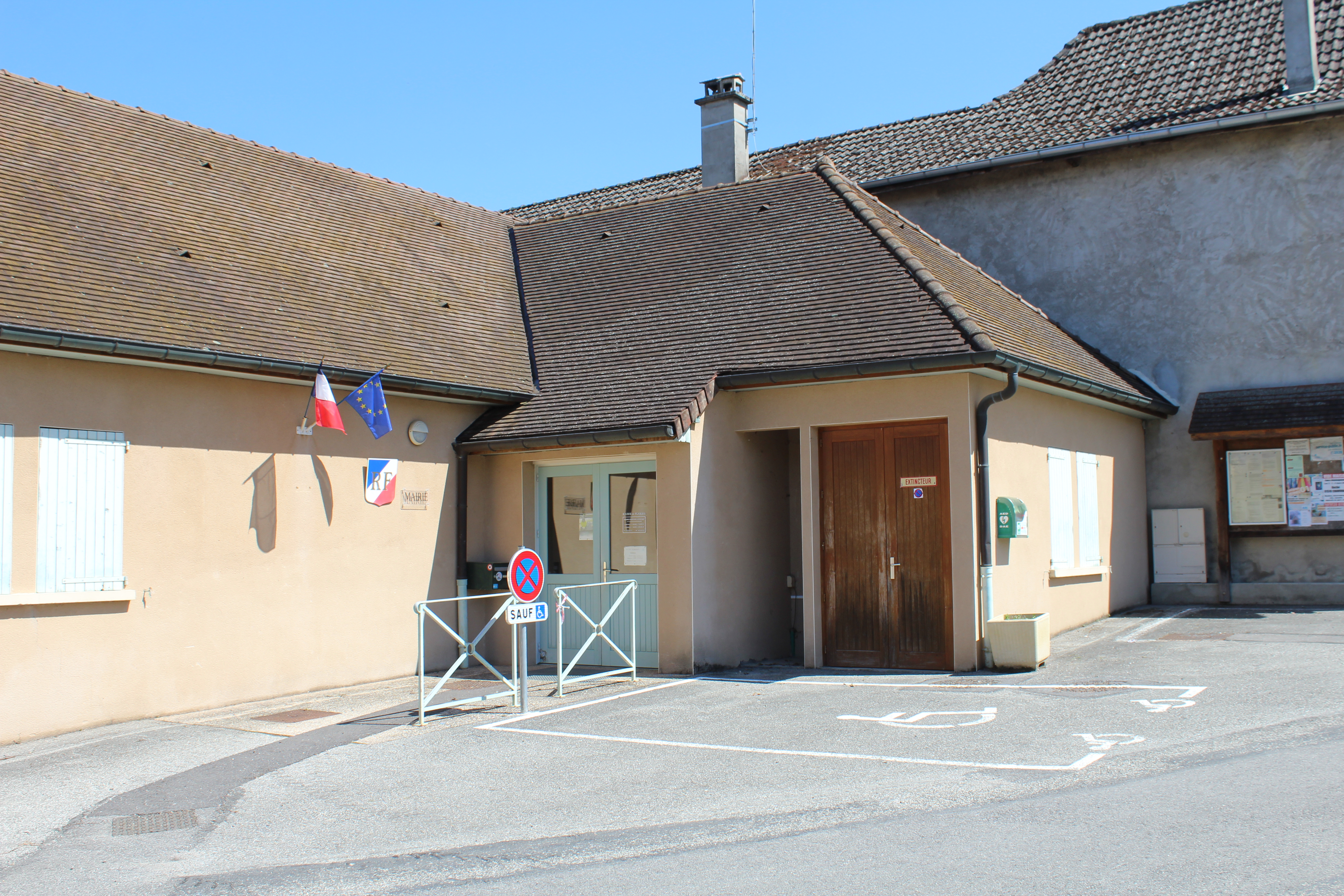
- Town hall
- Location of Flaxieu
- Location within France Location within Auvergne-Rhône-Alpes
- Coordinates: 45°49′00″N 5°44′00″E
- Country: France
- Region: Auvergne-Rhône-Alpes
- Department: Ain
- Arrondissement: Belley
- Canton: Belley

Government
  - Mayor (2026–32): Serge Bal
- Area^{1}: 2.79 km^{2} (1.08 sq mi)
- Elevation: 275 m (902 ft)
- Highest elevation: 285 m (935 ft)
- Lowest elevation: 225 m (738 ft)
- Population (2023): 71
  - Density: 25/km^{2} (66/sq mi)
- Time zone: UTC+01:00 (CET)
  - Summer (DST): UTC+02:00 (CEST)
- INSEE/Postal code: 01162 /01350
- ^{1} French Land Register data, which excludes lakes, ponds, glaciers > 1 km^{2} (0.386 sq mi or 247 acres) and river estuaries.

Flaxieu (French pronunciation: [flaksjø]) is a commune in the Ain department in eastern France.

== Population ==
Historical population
Year	Pop.	±% p.a.
1968	67	—
1975	47	−4.94%
1982	49	+0.60%
1990	53	+0.99%
1999	50	−0.65%
2007	55	+1.20%
2012	65	+3.40%
2017	68	+0.91%
2023	71	+0.72%
Source: INSEE

== See also ==
- Communes of the Ain department
