= Aix-les-Bains =

Aix-les-Bains Èx-los-Bens (Arpitan)
- Commune
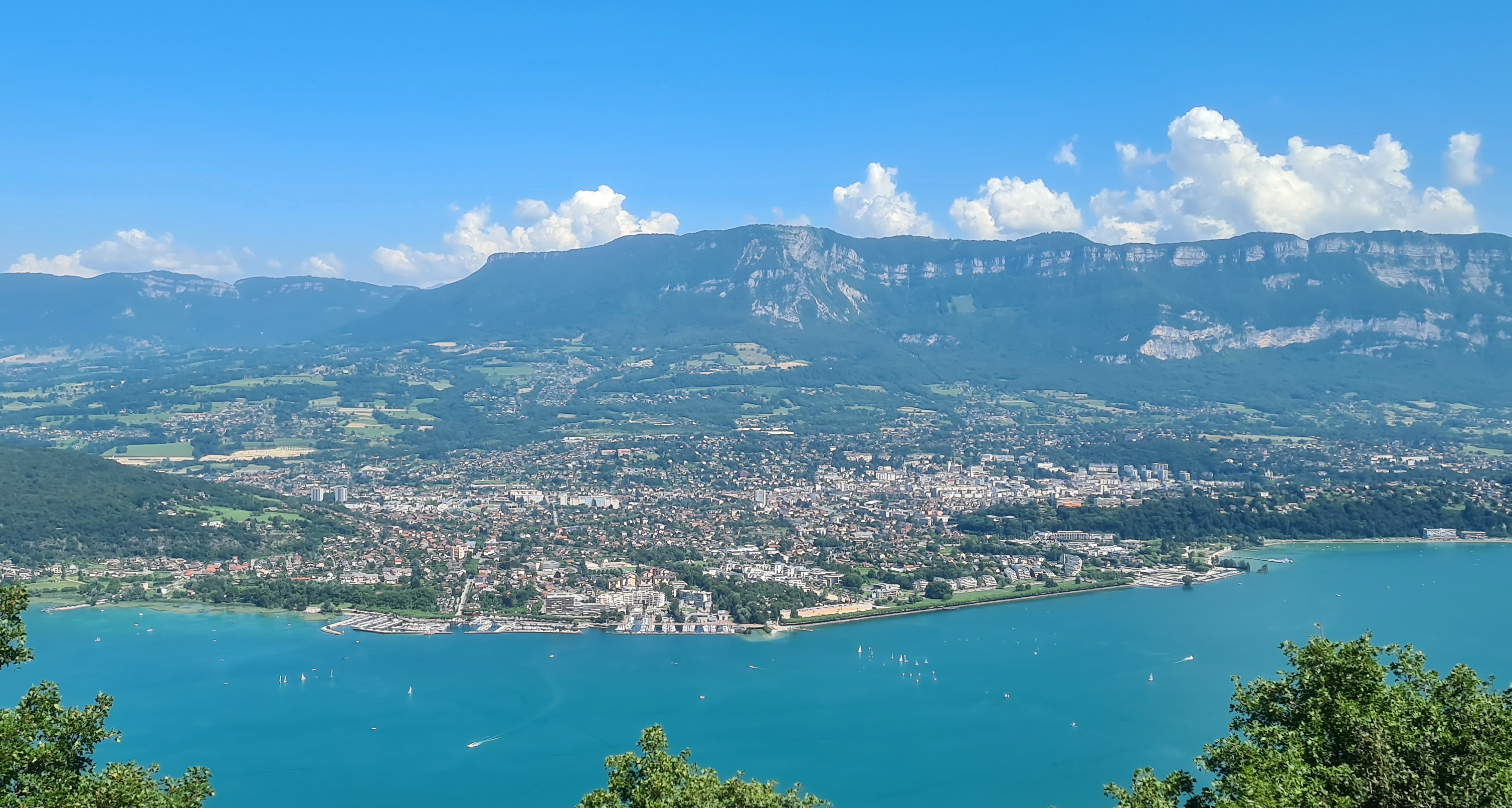
- Aix-les-Bains on Lake Bourget

- Coat of arms
- Location of Aix-les-Bains
- Location within France Location within Auvergne-Rhône-Alpes
- Coordinates: 45°41′19″N 5°54′55″E
- Country: France
- Region: Auvergne-Rhône-Alpes
- Department: Savoie
- Arrondissement: Chambéry
- Canton: Aix-les-Bains-1; Aix-les-Bains-2
- Intercommunality: CA Grand Lac

Government
  - Mayor (2020–2026): Renaud Beretti (LR)
- Area^{1}: 12.62 km^{2} (4.87 sq mi)
- Elevation: 320 m (1,050 ft)
- Highest elevation: 524 m (1,719 ft)
- Lowest elevation: 224 m (735 ft)
- Population (2023): 32,406
  - Density: 2,568/km^{2} (6,651/sq mi)
- Time zone: UTC+01:00 (CET)
  - Summer (DST): UTC+02:00 (CEST)
- INSEE/Postal code: 73008 /55344
- Website: Official website
- ^{1} French Land Register data, which excludes lakes, ponds, glaciers > 1 km^{2} (0.386 sq mi or 247 acres) and river estuaries.

Aix-les-Bains (US: /ˌeɪks leɪ ˈbæ̃, ˌɛks -/; French: [ɛks le bɛ̃]; Arpitan: Èx-los-Bens; lit. 'Aix-the-Baths'), known locally simply as Aix, is a commune in the southeastern French department of Savoie.

Situated on the shore of the largest natural lake of glacial origin in France, the Lac du Bourget, this resort is a major spa town; it has the largest freshwater marina in France. It is the second largest city in the Savoie department in terms of population, with a population of 32,406 as of 2023. It is part of the Chambéry functional urban area.

A leading town of the Belle Époque, of international renown, Aix-les-Bains was a vacation destination for nobility and the wealthy. Although the thermal baths are no longer the main attraction in Aix, the area continues to draw visitors for water sports and activities. The town has partially compensated for the loss of visitors coming for spa treatments by developing tourism. It hosts up to 200,000 general visitors annually, between tourists and people seeking mineral bath therapy. It is also an industrial city, with a few large companies such as General Electric, the headquarters of the Léon Grosse companies, ABB Cellier, Aixam, as well as a high-quality leather goods factory.

In addition to thermal baths and tourism, Aix-les-Bains is known for its national Musilac festival. It has four flowers and two golden flowers at the Concours des villes et villages fleuris, as well as the City of Art and History label.

== Geography ==
=== Location ===
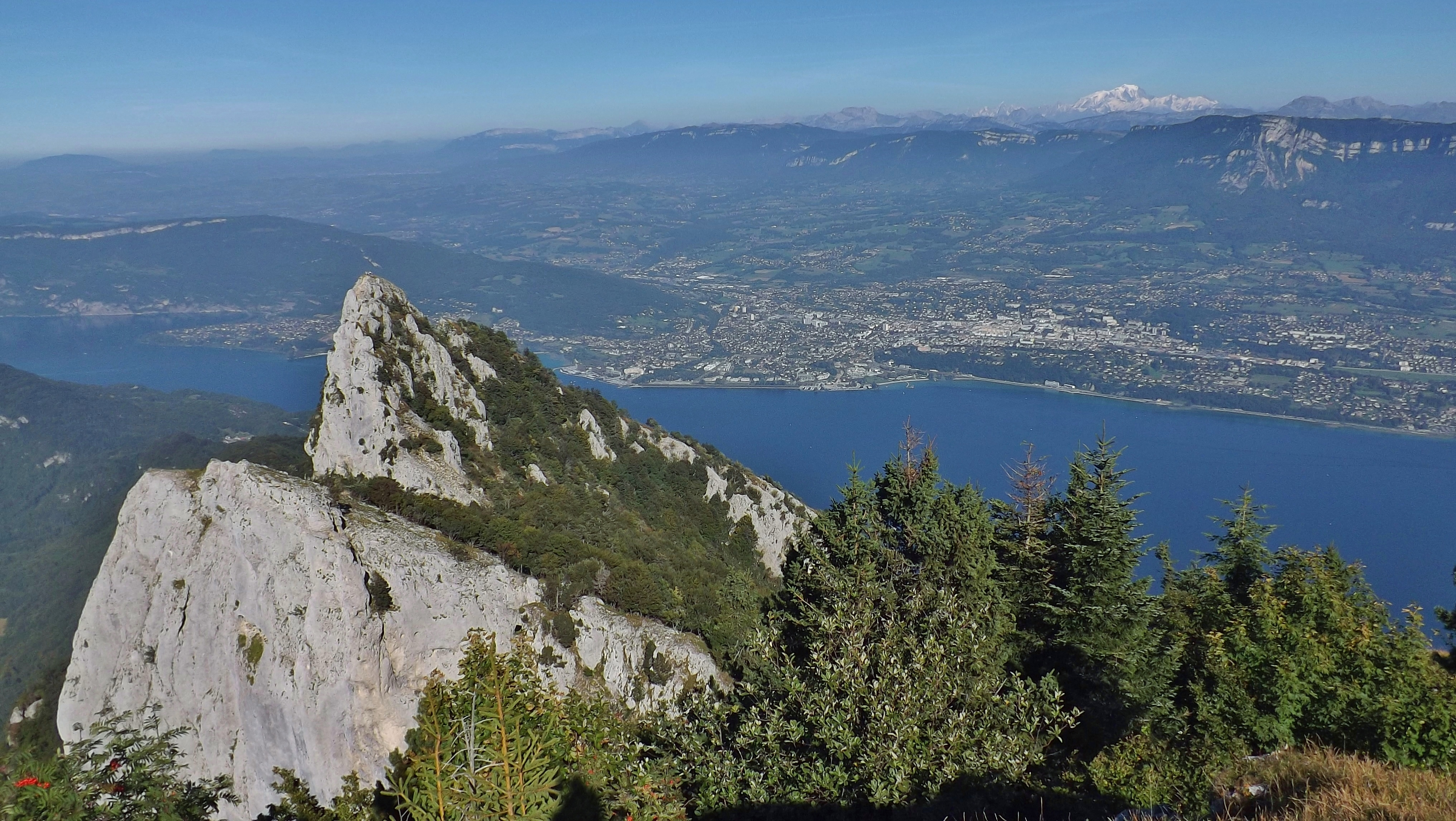
Aix-les-Bains in the background of the Dent du Chat, on the shore of the Lac du Bourget

Aix-les-Bains is located in the southeast of France, 107 kilometres (66 mi) east of Lyon. The town is located in a corridor between the mountain of Mont Revard, the first natural rampart of the Massif des Bauges to the east and the Lac du Bourget, the largest natural lake of France to the west. Thus, the city extends mostly on a north–south axis. Its extension is such that its agglomeration merges gradually with that of Chambéry. The area of the commune is 12.62 square kilometres (4.87 sq mi), which is large for the department. The town is traditionally divided into two, the lower town that occupies the banks of the lake to the west and the upper town, where the town centre is located, overlooking the Lac du Bourget. The town was first built on the heights in order to avoid the many floods of the lake until it was regulated by the dam of the Compagnie Nationale du Rhône (CNR) between the Rhône and the natural spillway of lake, the Canal de Savières. The average altitude of the city is about 320 metres (1,050 ft) while the lower part of it is only around 224 metres (735 ft), at the level of the lake.

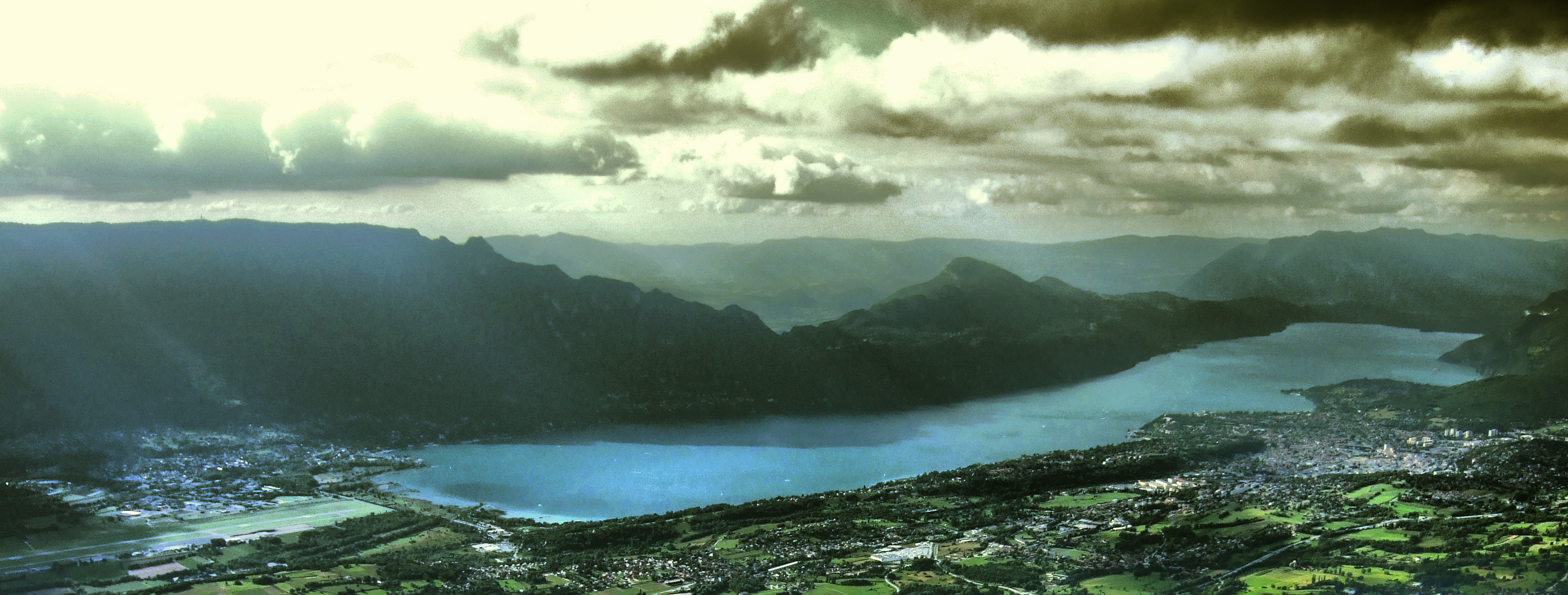
Aix-les-Bains on the eastern shore of the Lac du Bourget, to the right of the picture

560 square kilometres (220 sq mi) of the Lac du Bourget watershed is occupied by the spa town of Aix, which borders on the shore. The lake is primarily fed to the south by the waters of the Leysse, and to the east, by those of the Tillet and the Sierroz, both from the Aix territory. Native fish can be admired in the aquarium of Aix. The shore, which is occupied by Aix and Tresserve, is highly urbanized and developed along the northeastern part with the road and the railway track. Many restaurants and nightclubs are located there (mostly on the southeastern side). A nautical complex was built on its shore, this includes a swimming pool and a beach which has an Art Deco-style main entrance dating from 1936. After which is a vast esplanade, allowing walkers to stroll and special events to settle temporarily on this site. It offers a panoramic view of the lake and the Dent du Chat, where birds such as mute swans, mallards, grey herons, black-headed gulls and common moorhens can be found.

The esplanade is bounded to the north and to the south by the Grand port and the Petit port respectively, thus constituting the Aix port which is the largest fresh water port in the country with 1,500 mooring rings, having privileged places for boating on the lake, with boats having a summer or annual allocation. The festival of yachting takes place each year. This event has old boats coming from all horizons, a professional market, demonstrations and shows.

The slopes above the lake that culminate in the Tour de l'Angle Est, which overlooks the town and lake at a height of 1,562 m (5,125 ft). The western shore of the lake is narrower as the mountains along its edge are closer to the lakeshore, although lower than those on the eastern side. The lake drains out of its northern end into the River Rhône about 5 kilometres (3 miles) to the north.

=== Neighbouring communes ===
The municipality of Aix-les-Bains is bordered by nine communes. To the north, the municipality adjoins the territory of Brison-Saint-Innocent. To the northeast, Aix is bordered by the commune of Grésy-sur-Aix. Then, to the east, in the continuity of the Aix heights, the commune of Pugny-Chatenod is followed by the commune of Mouxy towards the southeast. Further to the southeast, Aix shares the boundaries of its territory with the neighbouring commune of Drumettaz-Clarafond. It follows south to the communes of Viviers-du-Lac and Tresserve. Finally, in the west, there are two communes bordering Aix, across the lake. These are Bourdeau, La Chapelle-du-Mont-du-Chat. One of the specific limits of the municipal territory of the commune of Aix-les-Bains, on its western side, is the existence of the boundary imposed by the Lac du Bourget. This limit of the territory is shared with five other municipalities, these being Bourdeau, Brison-Saint-Innocent, La Chapelle-du-Mont-du-Chat, Tresserve and Viviers-du-Lac.

=== Climate ===
Aix-les-Bains, like Chambéry, has an oceanic climate (Köppen: Cfb), with strong continental influences due to its position: far inland and near several mountain ranges, like the Jura mountains, Bauges and Bornes Massif.

Climate data for Chambéry (1981–2010 averages)
Month	Jan	Feb	Mar	Apr	May	Jun	Jul	Aug	Sep	Oct	Nov	Dec	Year
Record high °C (°F)	17.9 (64.2)	20.5 (68.9)	25.1 (77.2)	29.5 (85.1)	32.7 (90.9)	36.1 (97.0)	38.8 (101.8)	38.8 (101.8)	32.0 (89.6)	29.0 (84.2)	23.3 (73.9)	22.7 (72.9)	38.8 (101.8)
Mean daily maximum °C (°F)	5.8 (42.4)	7.9 (46.2)	12.6 (54.7)	16.3 (61.3)	20.8 (69.4)	24.6 (76.3)	27.4 (81.3)	26.6 (79.9)	22.0 (71.6)	16.7 (62.1)	10.1 (50.2)	6.4 (43.5)	16.4 (61.6)
Daily mean °C (°F)	2.2 (36.0)	3.6 (38.5)	7.4 (45.3)	10.7 (51.3)	15.2 (59.4)	18.7 (65.7)	21.0 (69.8)	20.4 (68.7)	16.5 (61.7)	12.0 (53.6)	6.3 (43.3)	3.1 (37.6)	11.4 (52.6)
Mean daily minimum °C (°F)	−1.4 (29.5)	−0.7 (30.7)	2.1 (35.8)	5.1 (41.2)	9.7 (49.5)	12.8 (55.0)	14.7 (58.5)	14.2 (57.6)	11.0 (51.8)	7.4 (45.3)	2.5 (36.5)	−0.2 (31.6)	6.4 (43.6)
Record low °C (°F)	−19.0 (−2.2)	−14.4 (6.1)	−10.3 (13.5)	−4.6 (23.7)	−1.4 (29.5)	2.8 (37.0)	5.4 (41.7)	5.0 (41.0)	1.0 (33.8)	−4.3 (24.3)	−10.8 (12.6)	−13.5 (7.7)	−19.0 (−2.2)
Average precipitation mm (inches)	102.6 (4.04)	91.5 (3.60)	100.0 (3.94)	92.2 (3.63)	104.2 (4.10)	94.8 (3.73)	86.6 (3.41)	91.7 (3.61)	111.8 (4.40)	122.6 (4.83)	105.0 (4.13)	118.0 (4.65)	1,221 (48.07)
Average precipitation days	9.8	8.2	10.4	10.3	11.5	9.7	7.9	8.9	8.6	10.8	10.0	10.5	116.6
Mean monthly sunshine hours	77.7	104.4	156.7	172.8	202.5	234.0	260.1	232.5	176.3	121.4	71.2	60.6	1,870.3
Source: Météo France

=== Communication and transport ===
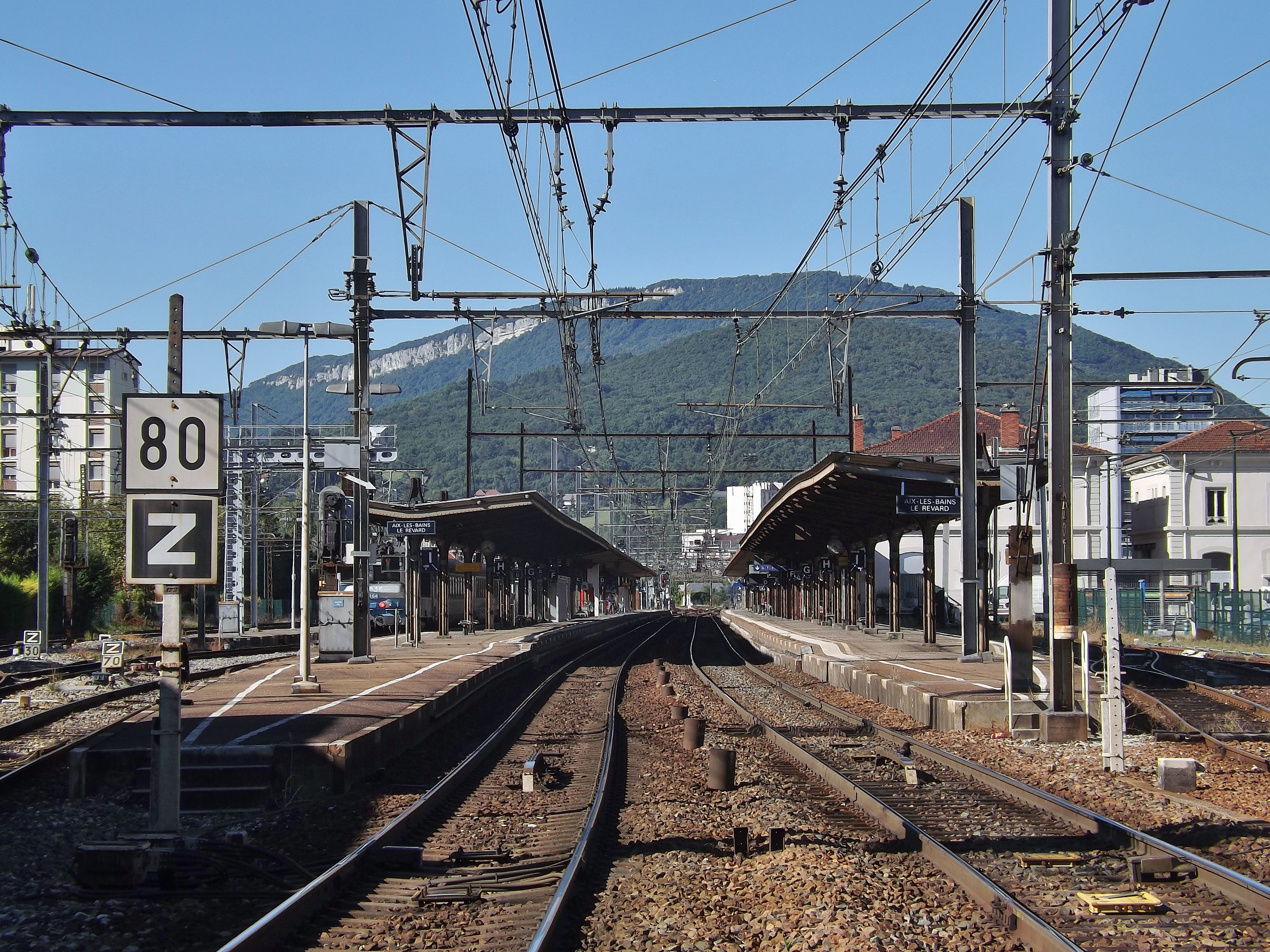
The southern route into the Gare d'Aix-les-Bains-Le Revard

Aix-Les-Bains is located on the major transport axis between Chambéry and Annecy. The northern branch of the A41 motorway passes to the east of the town, allowing direct access to Annecy and then later, by the continuity of the A40, into the city of Geneva. Two junctions (13 and 14) serve the commune, one to the south, the other to the north. On the secondary network, the RD 991 road crosses Aix and joins Viviers-du-Lac and Chambéry to the south. To the west, the D1201 road heads towards the south-west and the Lac du Bourget towards the commune of Le Bourget-du-Lac and, through the centre, the D991 road.

Aix-les-Bains is also accessible by train. It was one of the earliest European municipalities to host a rail network in its territory when it was administered by the Dukes of Savoie. Today, the city is connected to Chambéry and Annecy and Culoz. The Turin–Lyon high-speed railway will, in the coming years, bring together the cities of Paris, Lyon, Turin and Milan. Aix-les-Bains station has been a multimodal transport hub since 2007. Located to the west of the town centre on Boulevard de President Wilson, Aix-les-Bains-Le Revard railway station is served by the TGV, which puts the town within three hours of Paris. Aix is situated 9 km (5.6 mi) north of Chambéry, by rail.

Chambéry-Savoie Airport, formerly Aix-les-Bains/Chambéry, is located at the south of the town of Aix-les-Bains, in the commune of Voglans, a few metres from the south shore of the Lac du Bourget. It serves many countries including the UK (Manchester, Birmingham, Edinburgh), Denmark (Copenhagen, Billund), Sweden (Gothenburg) and, internally, Paris Orly from 2013. There are many winter flights due to the proximity of the winter sports resorts. Three low-cost carrier airlines offer regular flights. In 2002, the airport recorded a record attendance with 3,600 aircraft movements year-round, dealing with more than 10,000 passengers per weekend, mainly in winter.

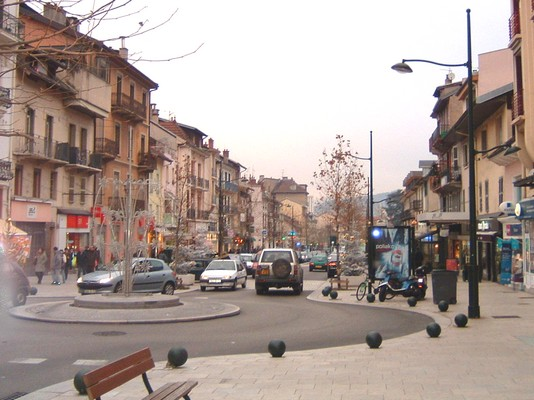
One of the streets in the town centre

In the town centre, the car is the most common mode of transport in Aix-les-Bains, despite the efforts made by the Association Roue Libre for the development of urban cycling. Traffic at peak hours is particularly difficult, especially in the summer with the influx of tourists. The portion of the D1201 road along the lake, in the direction of Chambéry, is particularly sensitive to this increase in road traffic. The same problem happens with the Rue de Genève, the Boulevard President Wilson and the Rue de Chambéry. To the north, it is similarly so on the way out of the town in the direction of Albens and Annecy on the Boulevard Maréchal de Lattre de Tassigny. However, traffic has tended to improve with urban development promoting the emergence of roundabouts at the expense of the traffic light, allowing a better flow of traffic. In addition, in the town centre, two car parks can accommodate vehicles, although the number of parking spaces remains low in the town centre for shopping.

For travellers preferring public transport, two main bus routes and sixteen additional routes serve the metropolitan area. Two routes are also available to access the side of Mont Revard and the Chapel of the Mont du Chat. Ondea (trade name of the network operated by the company Keolis) was tasked by the CALB to manage transit services. It employs 55 people. During the summer, the town is served for short trips by a small train travelling on the roads. It runs between the esplanade of the lake, the beach and town centre.

== Urbanism ==
=== Urban morphology ===
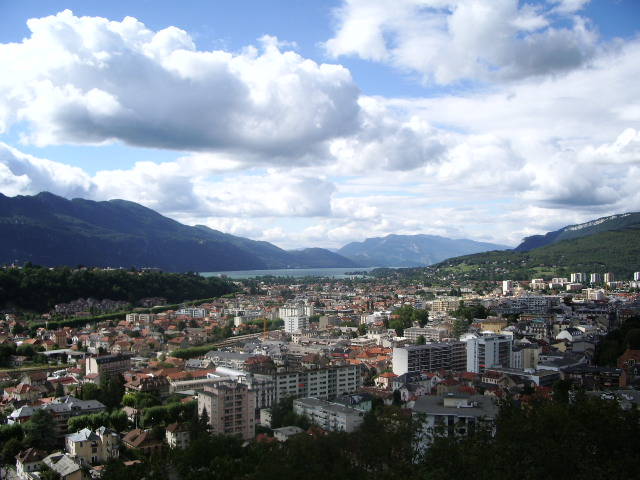
A view of Aix-les-Bains in the direction of the lake

The life of Aix-les-Bains is located largely on its heights where its downtown, the economic heart, and its thermal baths (the National Baths of Chevalley and the Baths of Marlioz) are located. Indeed, the history of the town has made it a spa town. Aix was organized around this activity, which was initiated by the Romans. The lower part of the town, located on the shores of the lake, was abandoned because of the risk of flooding. The land was cultivated and there were fish farms. The economic activity is mainly on the upper part, and the urban morphology has adapted. It had to take into account living space for services (racecourse, casino, thermal baths, deluxe hotels, station, hospital and golf, for instance) and the surrounding geography.

Aix-les-Bains includes grand boulevards which are the Robert Barrier Boulevard, Boulevard Lepic, Russia Boulevard/President Wilson Boulevard, the Boulevard of Dr. Jean Charcot/Boulevard Maréchal de Lattre de Tassigny and President Franklin Delano Roosevelt Boulevard. These boulevards are wide and open unlike the streets of downtown, which are narrower, and the other axes, which can be more constrained because of the proximity of the Massif des Bauges and its winding climbs, meeting the more anarchic requirements of the moment without taking the urban fabric into overall account. The town includes various neighborhoods such as Chantemerle, Boncelin, around the railway station, the Sierroz, la liberté, the lakeside, Marlioz, Lepic, Franklin Roosevelt and many others.

With urban expansion and population growth Aix-les-Bains constantly extends, similarly to the neighbouring communes. Little by little, one speaks beyond a city of Aix-les-Bains as such, but the Aix area encompassing an urban plan, with the nearby communes such as Tresserve, Grésy-sur-Aix, Mouxy, Méry, Drumettaz-Clarafond, Sonnaz, as well as other communes. This phenomenon also applies to Chambéry, which is located south of Aix-les-Bains and is considered as the Chambéry area. The urban morphology of these two local watersheds tends to draw them inexorably closer together. In order to reconcile the urban development of the Aix and Chambéry areas, the joint association of the Métropole Savoie has been implemented. The mission is to follow the pattern of territorial coherence (SCOT) of the Combe de Savoie, Chambéry and the Lac du Bourget.

=== Housing ===
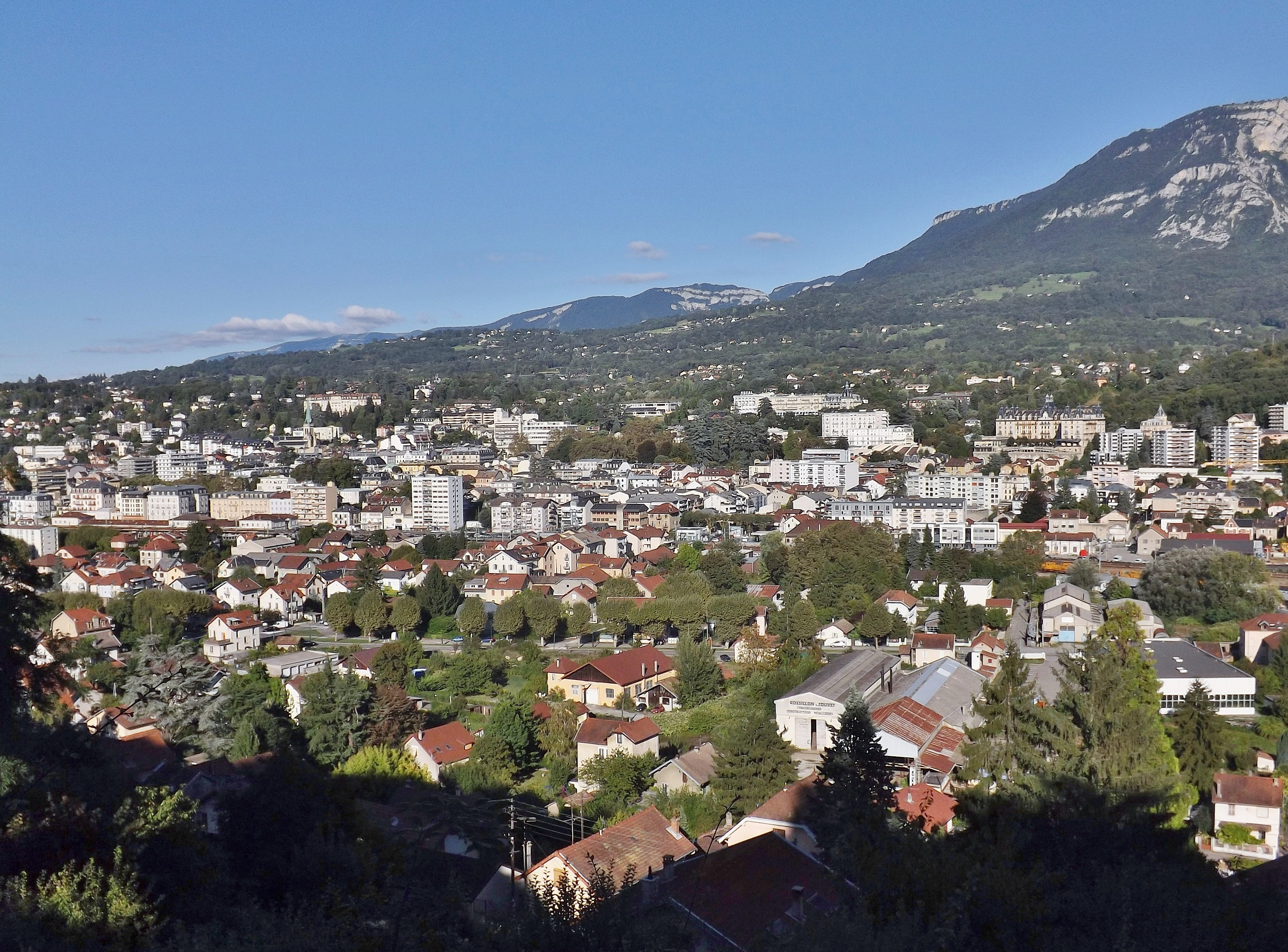
A view of the town at the foot of the Bauges

Aix-les-Bains had 20,317 homes in 2017, of which 15,491 (76.2%) were main residences. 18% of the main residences were built before 1945, and 30% were built after 1990. 22.4% of all houses are detached houses and 76.4% are apartments. 52.7% of the main residences are owned by their occupants, 45.2% are occupied by tenants.

1,837 are HLM rent-controlled housing, or 15.7% of the area in 1999, the city did not meet the provisions of article 55 of the Law on Solidarity and Urban Renewal of December 2000, which laid down a 20% minimum rate of social housing in the most important municipalities. It further noted that the number of vacant dwellings was quite high in 1999, accounting for 11.4% of the area. The OPAC of the Savoie, with more than 1,657 social homes in the commune, manages the assets of about 2,500 homes, through its antenna Aix-les-Bains. This includes 1,600 of Aix-les-Bains, located in the Sierroz-Franklin neighbourhood among others. Homes with four rooms account for 46% of the overall housing stock, with three-roomed homes at 27.4%, and two rooms at 17.5%. Small housing accounts for about one-tenth of Aix housing (studios: 9.1%). These accommodations are well staffed and equipped, particularly because of the geographic location at the heart of the Alps, since 93.9% have central heating and 58.5% have a garage or a parking space.

With the fact that the town is urbanized almost in its entirety, it becomes increasingly more difficult to build larger houses to accommodate families who don't live in the city. The edge of the lake and the hills are beginning to be saturated where there is a sprawl from the surrounding communities. It is worth noting the presence of much accommodation within former large luxury hotels, ruins from the Belle Époque, now gone.

=== Planning projects ===
Several projects of the municipality are underway in the downtown area, on the western shore of the lake as well as mainly to the south. This is to establish new areas of commercial activity to attract new business to the Aix economic area. The establishment of new residential areas is also scheduled. In collaboration with the municipalities of Méry and Drumettaz-Clarafond, through concerted urban development, the town of Aix-les-Bains contributes to the emergence of an activity called the Savoie Hexapôle area and also enables the development of a commercial area serving all of the southern sector of the Aix area.

The ZAC des Bords du Lac, under construction, will extend over about 15 hectares (37 acres) at the location of, among others, the former municipal campground of Sierroz. This very controversial project is yet to be launched by the Deputy Mayor Dominique Dord's municipal team. This new district, developed by the Society for the Development of the Savoy was named Aix–du Lac.

A 36 metres (118 ft)-wide promenade was built, between Barrier and Garibaldi Boulevards, named Allée promenade des bords de lac. This is essentially the opening of a road with a narrow lane of traffic in both directions. The rest will be dedicated to pedestrians, cyclists and trees. This lane will host "high environmental quality" accommodation and nearby businesses that will benefit residents of the neighborhood and buildings under construction.

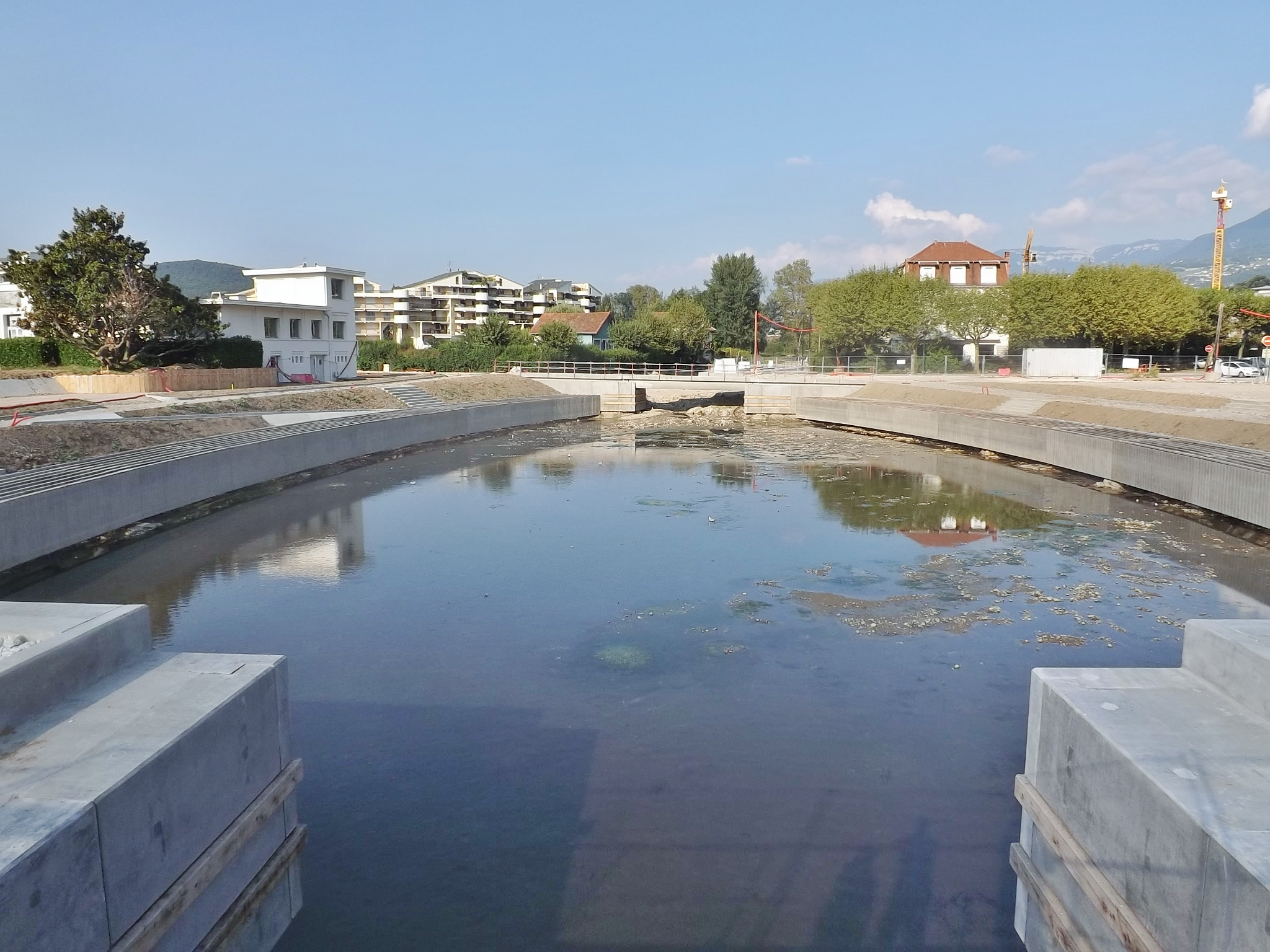
Civil engineering of the River Tillet mouth to the Lac du Bourget, in 2013

In 2013, one of the major projects of the municipal council was the restoration of the course of the River Tillet and the creation of a harbour for boats at the Petit Port near this river leading into the Lac du Bourget. The work amounts to 7 million Euros. By rearranging the small harbor, the city wants to take advantage of the situation by decontaminating the River Tillet, which is heavily polluted with polychlorinated biphenyls (PCBs). The municipality and the CALB chose for a solution to store the PCB-contaminated soil on-site. The waste transport solution to a specialized treatment center was not successful. Among the comments from various stakeholders in the project, it was said: "It (the contaminated soil) will be placed in a watertight compartment and will be used to make an embankment to widen the roadway of the Garibaldi Boulevard, which runs alongside Le Pêcheur campsite, and to develop sidewalks and parking.

The work to the harbour for boats has also brought upheavals to the level of traffic. Petit Port will become a cul-de-sac. Barrier Boulevard, previously connected to the Petit Port Avenue, will no longer be so in the future, as the municipality decided to postpone the flow of traffic on the Garibaldi Boulevard, this boulevard will become the new main road to get to the Barrier Boulevard through the small streets which form the way of Biatres and, with a fusion of greenery, a new axis between the business district and the Sierroz campsite. The Boulevard du port aux filles will become a one-way street, except for buses.

== Toponymy ==
Aix-les-Bains, a city founded in the 1st century AD, is rarely mentioned in the epigraphic texts, and never known by Roman authors. However, two inscriptions preserved by the Archaeological Museum mention of the Latin Aquae (literally: "Waters" cf. Aix-la-Chapelle (Aachen) or Aix-en-Provence) and Aquensis (local residents of water), so information is provided about the name of this vicus dependent on the city of Vienne. The historians of the 19th century were sometimes subjected to read fanciful names which are without historical foundation, some of which still appear in some books. These include Aquae allobrogium, Aquae gratianæ (an inscription which adorned the façade of the National Baths from 1934 to 1968, and to commemorate the Emperor Gratian, who was assassinated not far away, in Lyon, in 383) and Allobrogum Aquae Gratianæ. The name Aquae is found in the deed of the gift of the royal land of Aix (de Acquis or "acquired") by King Rudolph III of Burgundy to his wife Ermengarde, in 1011. Some texts from the Middle Ages mention of Aquae grationapolis. This suffix simply stating that Aix was part of the diocese of Grenoble.

The first known mention of Aix-les-Bains appears in the archives from September 1792, in a letter from a French soldier recuperating at Aix waters. It is this name which then appears in all official documents, including the deliberations of the municipal council. In the early 19th century, some literary texts made use of the appellation: Aix en Savoie. However, this name has never been used in administrative documents. Since 1954, the railway station of Aix-les-Bains, at the request of the council, has been called Aix-les-Bains-le Revard.

== History ==
The history of Aix-les-Bains is directly related to the Lac du Bourget and especially to its hot springs which made it a spa among the most renowned in the world. The historical analysis of the town must be closer to the history of the Savoy, if we are to better understand its evolution and its cultural influences. Below are periods and historical highlights of the commune of Aix-les-Bains.

=== Aquae: Roman Aix ===
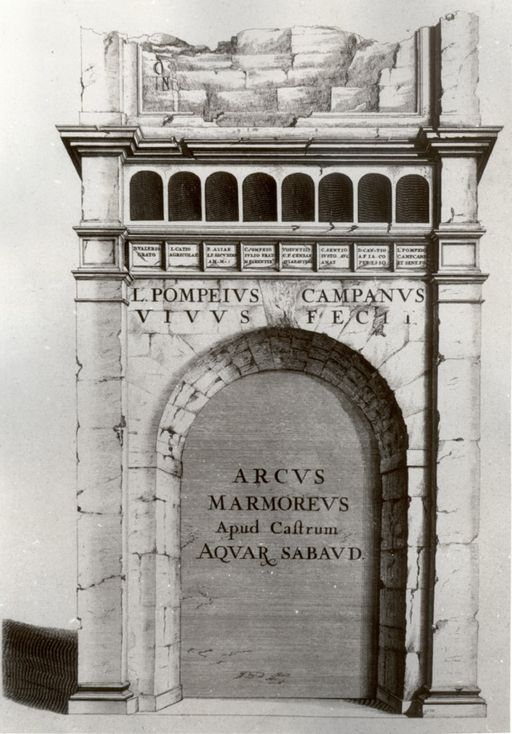
L'Arch of Campanus, designed by Borgonio in 1674

Historians agree that Aix was born from its sources of water to Ancient Rome, on the remains of a Celtic habitat. The first occupation of the site has been dated by Alain Canal to the first century BCE, however there is nothing to suggest these remains were a fixed habitat. We are left with the remains in public institutions and it would be difficult to draw a sketch of ancient Aquae. The administrative situation of the place is known by epigraphy, which teaches us that Aix was, in the 1st century AD, a vicus, with a board of decemlecti (a council of ten members), and was administratively part of Vienne. Some citizens lived there with, apparently, quite important resources to offer to the gods, a sacred wood, a vine or to build a funeral arch for the case of the Campanii family.

During their excavations, archaeologists have discovered a large thermal complex, in close proximity to its sources. On a lower terrace, to the west, was the Arch of Campanus, probably built in the 1st century, and more downstream, a second terrace carried the temple said to be dedicated to Diana, which had replaced a more ancient circular edifice by the 2nd century, which was probably contemporary with the Arch of Campanus. Remains of a necropolis have been cleared north of the temple. The Parc des Thermes, and various other locations scattered in the town, contain numerous and very varied remains, such as remains of the necropolis and pottery, etc. However, there is no centrepiece which would have led to extensive archaeological excavations. Otherwise, we know nothing of the Gallo-Romans of the Aquae vicus, in scope or in the provision of the habitat. Where did the "Romans" live? Where were their farms, the villages of their staff; What were the activities of the vicus? The mystery is still present. The only clues come from the archaeological map of the remains by archaeological services of the DRAC, and for archaeologist Alain Canal to conclude, "Paradoxically, if Aix has delivered many documents illustrating the age of the site and the quality of the monumental town planning from the beginning of the Roman Empire, we have no precise knowledge about the order of this town."

As a synthesis, the history of the period can be reduced to the occupation of the town centre site from the 1st century BCE, followed by a gradual development of the area between the 1st and 2nd centuries. Occupation seems to be made from the progressive construction of the thermal complex, around which radiated monumental buildings presented on a system of terraces, which had evolved several times during the Roman period. If hot springs were originally the reason for choosing the location, other factors, such as the quality of the site, may have been decisive.

=== From the Middle Ages to the Renaissance ===
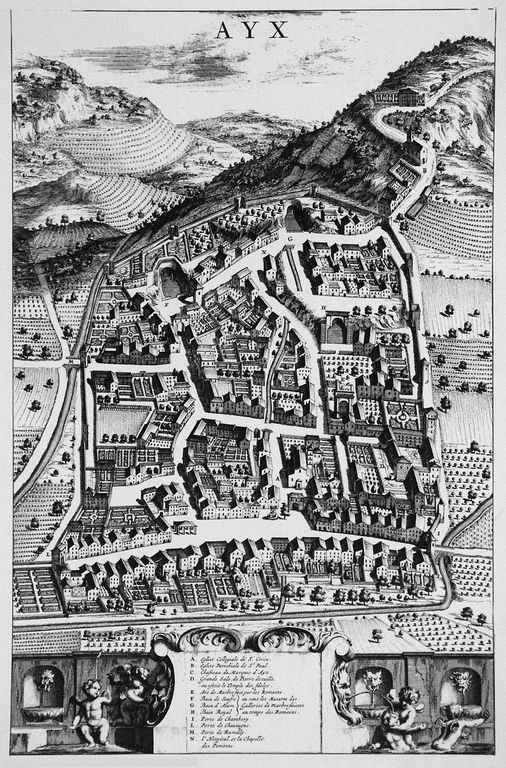
Aix in 1674, from the Theatrum Sabaudiae

The already poor knowledge of Aix history from Roman times is further obscured due to the lack of sources regarding the end of the Roman Empire and the early Middle Ages. We are left to conjecture by studying the destruction from the barbarian invasions that have left traces of fires on Gallo-Roman villas of the area, such as at Arbin. The fact remains that the Roman Baths of Aix fell to ruins from the fifth century and traces of urban development are lost.

Aix-les-Bains is again mentioned in sources from the 9th century, in 867, and in 1011 through charters. In the latter, King Rudolph III of Burgundy donated the villa of Aix, called a royal seat, with its settlers and its slaves to his wife Ermengarde who, in turn, pass them to the bishopric of Grenoble. This Charter tells us that Aix is a small town with a church and agricultural areas. Bishop Hugues of Grenoble then donated it to the monastery of Saint-Martin de Miserere, at the beginning of the 12th century. The church erected a new priory under the name of Sainte Marie.

At the end of the 12th century, the cartulary of Saint Hugues reveals the existence of two other parishes, Saint-Simond with its church and that of Saint-Hippolyte (in the current area of Mouxy) also with a small priory. Urban geography begins to clarify: One can imagine the small town, contained in its walls, which nobody knew when was built. The central point of the town is the priory, near the ancient Roman temple. This centre could also have been the administrative centre since at least the 13th century. Aix was a seigneurie subservient to the de Seyssel family, who had a château which, even if we do not place with certainty, was probably the location of the actual château. Two hamlets are attested, Saint-Hippolyte, in the immediate vicinity of the town but outside the ramparts, with a small priory at the centre and at its side, now under the Villa Chevalley, a strong House, the maison forte de Saint-Pol [strong House of Saint-Pol], dependent upon the de Savoie family which recent studies date back to the 13th century. A second important village appears, Saint Simond (Saint Sigismond) with it having a church and a cemetery, established as a parish, and a dependent of Saint-Hippolyte.

The texts suggest the existence of other villages including a certified record from 1561, during the general census of the population for the salt tax. At that time, there were about 1095 inhabitants of Aix, 46% living in the village; Saint Simond had 125 inhabitants, Puer had 91 people, Choudy had 87 people and Lafin had 86 people, with the rest of the hamlets, about a dozen, sharing the rest. (Marlioz having escaped from the sources). This geography of the habitat seems frozen until the end of the 19th century. In Aix, the nearby Abbey of Hautecombe owned a large area at the heights of Saint Simond.

At the beginning of the 16th century, the ancient church suffered a devastating fire. The Aix people requested the help of Claude de Seyssel in order to rebuild. He was a seigneurial family member of the town, and was raised to the episcopal dignity. He was the Bishop of Albi, and an especially special advisor to the King of France Louis XII. He is also the author of a number of treaties. With support from De Seyssel the people were able to build a collegiate church, with a chapter of twelve canons, commissioned by a dean, whose appointment was returned to the count. A church was built on the nearby square of the cemetery, which included a choir of flamboyant Gothic style. If the choir belonged to the collegiate church, the nave belonged to the parishioners and presented a more plain appearance. Besides, the poorly constructed roof collapsed in 1644. Among the side chapels, one was reserved for the De Seyssels of Aix, in which is buried their dead. The collegiate church, fully a parish church after the Revolution, was demolished in 1909, after the construction of the new church. This church was known to house a relic of the true cross, which had been worshipped from a distance. It is also at the end of the Middle Ages that the stately Château of Aix was rebuilt. The ceiling of the Great Hall of the ground floor is dated to 1400. The magnificent staircase of honour was built around 1590.

=== During the 18th century ===
On 9 April 1739, a huge fire broke out in the town centre and destroyed 80 homes, nearly half of the town. Reconstruction was made with appeal for subsidies from the king, who imposed an alignment plan whose implementation was entrusted to the engineer Garella. This plan went further than a simple plan of reconstruction since it provided a true alignment of streets, and imposed some rules of urbanism as, for example, the construction of houses of two floors and a ground floor; it also prohibited thatched roofs. However, it was very limited in its scope since it concerned only the burned area or the main street (Rue Albert I), the central square (Place Carnot) and Rue des Bains.

At the beginning of the 17th century, the Aix people and the medical world had begun to become aware of the value of the hot springs of Aix, through the writings of the dauphinois physician Jean Baptiste Cabias, who was followed in this area by other renowned doctors. Indeed, since ancient times the exploitation of sources of hot water had never been completely forgotten. Bathing took place in Aix in the Middle Ages and until the end of the 18th century, in the only existing Roman pool, outdoors, or at home where the spa water was brought by hand. The King of France Henry IV highly appreciated his Aix bath, according to Jean Baptiste Cabias. In 1737, to protect the hot springwater seepage from the stream running through the city, a major project was scheduled by the General Commissariat. This changed the urban distribution of the town centre, since it was necessary to dig a new bed for the Moulins stream, outside the walls. They also had to rebuild the four mills of the Marquis of Aix, until then in the town centre, along the new channel (currently Montée des moulins, Hill of Mills).

It is the Duke of Chablais, son of King Victor Amadeus III, to whom Aix owes its renaissance because it was he who, after having tasted the benefit of sources and found it to be poorly housed, suggested the construction of a thermal establishment to the king. By royal appointment on 11 June 1776, King Victor Amadeus III commissioned Robiland to draw up plans for a bathing establishment. It was built from 1779 to 1783, under the direction of the engineer, Capellini. This date also marks the beginning of the demolition of the old town centre, as a result of this imposing construction, people began to clear the surrounding houses to create the place. This first thermal establishment became an important factor of development.

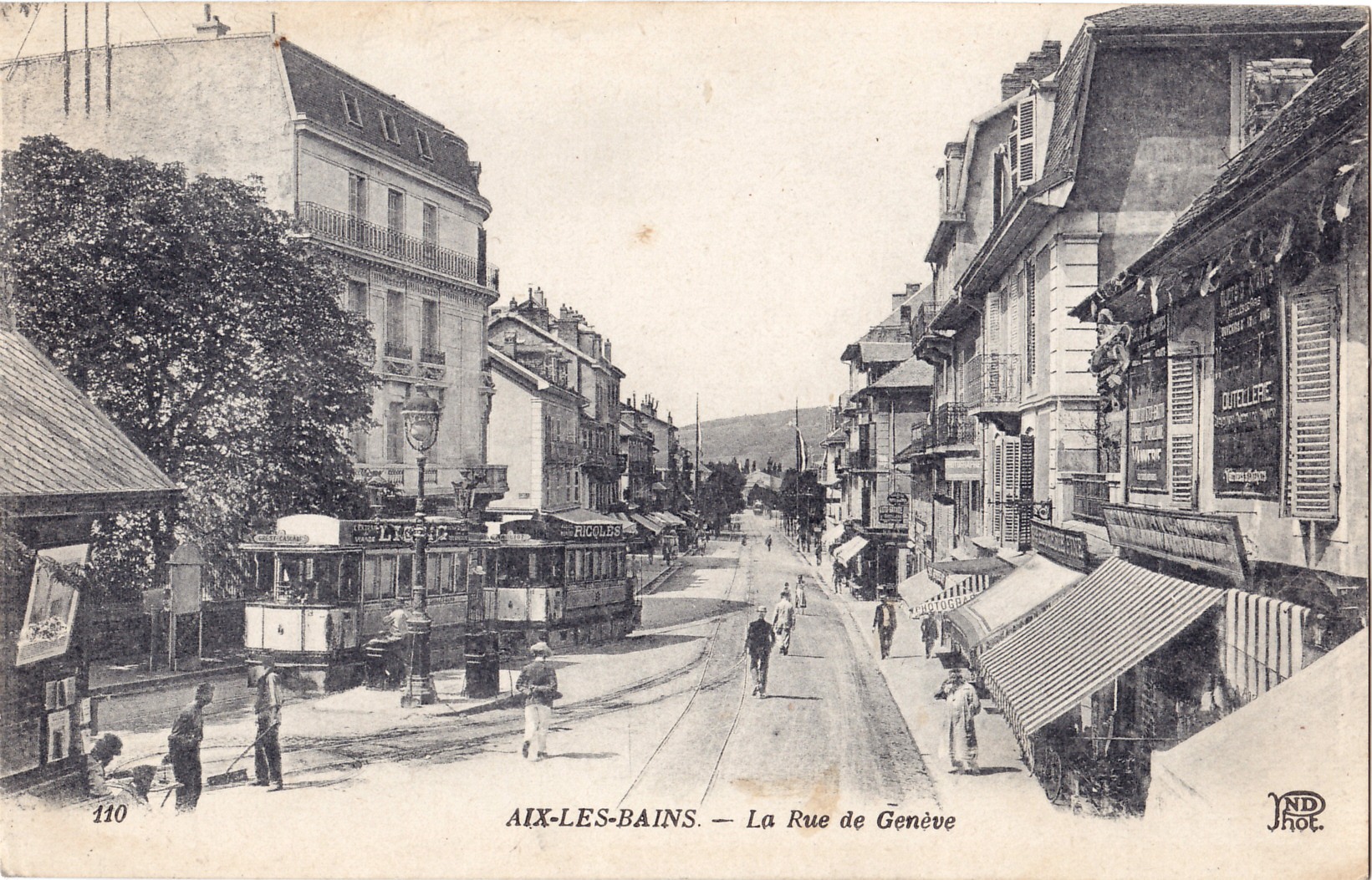
The town was endowed, from 1896 to 1908, with the Tramway d'Aix-les-Bains. Pictured here the heart of the network, at the junction of the streets of Geneva and Casino.

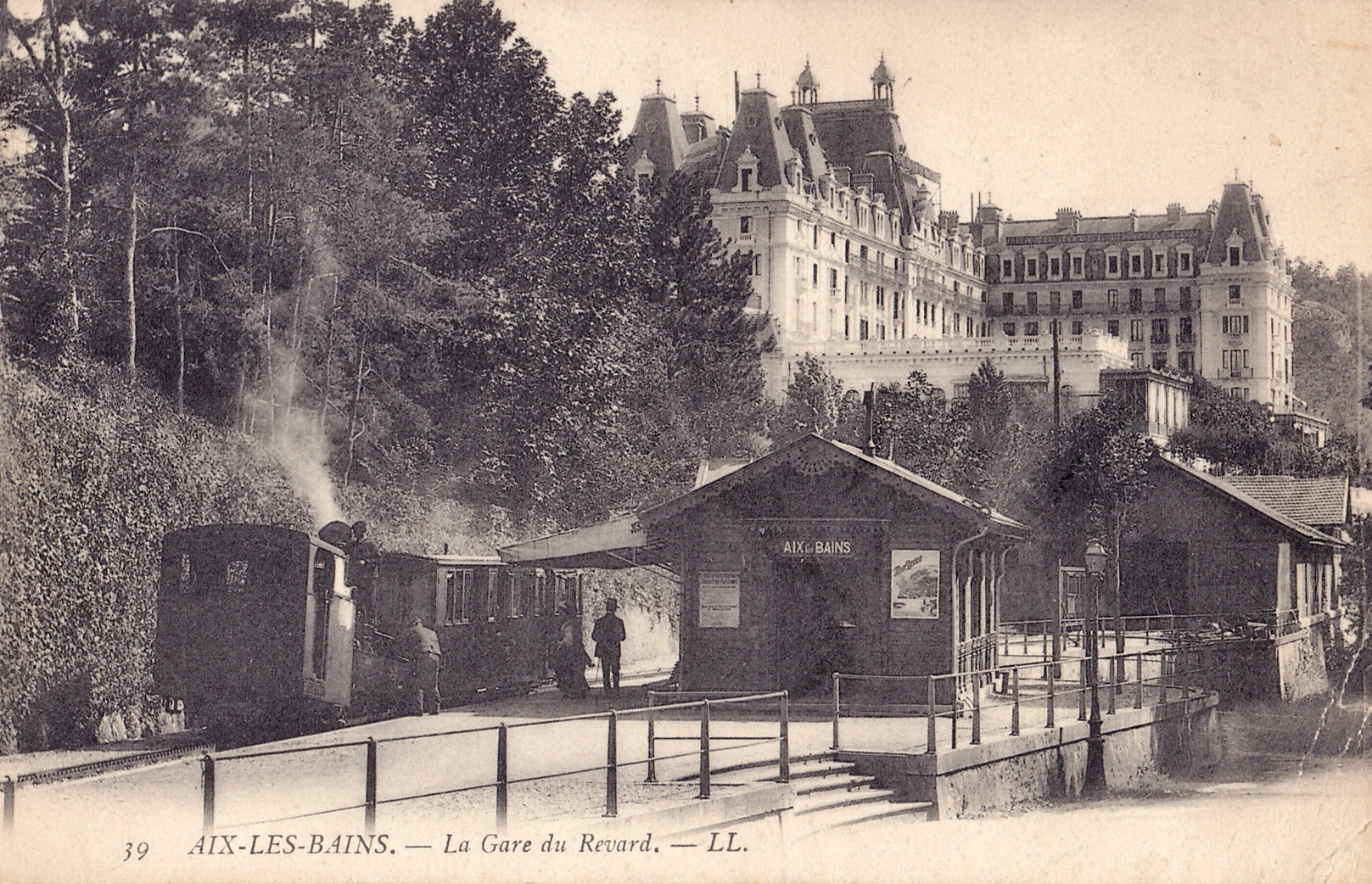
The gare du Revard [Revard railway station] in Aix was the origin of the Railway of Mont-Revard, which connected the city to Mont Revard from 1882 to 1937, eventually replaced by an aerial tramway.

Throughout this period and until the Revolution, the town hosted a roughly stable number of approximately 600 patients each year, the majority of them French. Consecutively, the population increased, reaching 1700 inhabitants in 1793. In 1783, to enhance the lives of the patients, the council of the municipality built a landscaped public promenade: le Gigot currently known as Square Alfred Boucher. It was then lined with chestnut trees and was drawn by architect Louis Lampro. Aside from private gardens, this is the first act of urban green space, which gave a boost to the development of the town at this side of the walls, along the road to Geneva.

In 1792 the French revolutionary troops, under the command of Montesquiou, were in Savoy. The civilian use of the spa then stalled. The baths were requisitioned by the armies of the Republic, which sent the wounded soldiers for convalescence. However, it was also an opportunity to publicise Aix to the greatest number. Aix became Aix-les-Bains. With the Revolution accomplished, the privileges of the local nobility were abolished, and this especially helped the town from paying the Lord Marquess of Aix the large sum of money which it owed him for the redemption of seigneurial rights (the town had no charter of franchise). Furthermore, freedom of established trade gave new impetus to the creation of an economy based on the exploitation of the springs as soon as peace was regained. Then we see the development of boarding houses, hotels, cabarets and restaurants. On the other hand, the Revolution left its marks on church property, such as the abandonment of the collegiate church, destruction of the bell tower and the church furniture.

It was at the lakeside where one could find new development. The small Puer harbour breakwater, built under the Ancien Régime in 1720 became a real port. First frequented by boats refuelling the troops of the army of the Alps, equipped with a military store, it is gradually built for export goods and, in particular, from the trinkets of workshops installed at the edge of the lake. It became known as the Port of Puer. The development of this neighbourhood involved improvement of the avenue du lac [avenue of the lake] and all this activity attracted the first buildings along this busy avenue, outside of the centre and of the existing villages.

=== Negotiations for the independence of Morocco ===
The negotiations for the independence of Morocco were held in Aix-les-Bains. At the conference of September 1955, the President of the French Council, in the person of Edgar Faure, publicly summed up the compromise proposed in Morocco, in the expression "Independence within interdependence". Until then, Moroccan territory was legally a French protectorate and Sultan Mohammed V was in forced exile. The negotiations were held in the presence of numerous personalities and French and Moroccan organizations. At the talks, Moroccan side tabled the Democratic Independence Party (PDI) as well as the Istiqlal Party, represented by Mehdi Ben Barka, Omar Benabdeljalil, Abdelhadi Boutaleb, Abderrahim Bouabid and also M'hamed Boucetta. On the French side, the delegation consisted of Edgar Faure, Pierre July, Robert Schuman and other members of the government. In addition to these were invited guests, from all walks, capable of giving advice on the status of Morocco and independence. Faithful allies of the protectorate and the Moroccan traditional chiefs were also invited. Thus, they could also negotiate in the presence of the parties concerned. They were given precedence, if possible, to the disappointment of the Istiqlal Party.

Although these negotiations held in Aix-les-Bains played an important role in the march towards the independence of Morocco, the fact remains that France had previously taken care to largely prepare for this transition. Indeed, the French State was convinced of the need to allow independence to this North African territory. However, with many economic interests at stake and many business relationships, notably the pashas and qaids, pushed France to take care not to rush this transition and initiate this change, smoothly. The destiny of the sovereignty of the Kingdom of Morocco was drawn during this conference at Aix-les-Bains. Officially, negotiations made it possible to reach an agreement to give birth to an independent state. Morocco was finally proclaimed independent during the declaration of La Celle-Saint-Cloud on 6 November 1955. In 2005, there was the commemoration of the fiftieth anniversary of the negotiation of the agreements of the independence of Morocco. For this occasion, a fountain with a pool was made in Moroccan zellige. Maalems craftsmen came specially from their spiritual home to complete this work in the parc de verdure of Aix-les-Bains. The project was supported by the regional council of tourism of the city of Fez (Fez-CRT) and the tourist office.

== Politics and administration ==
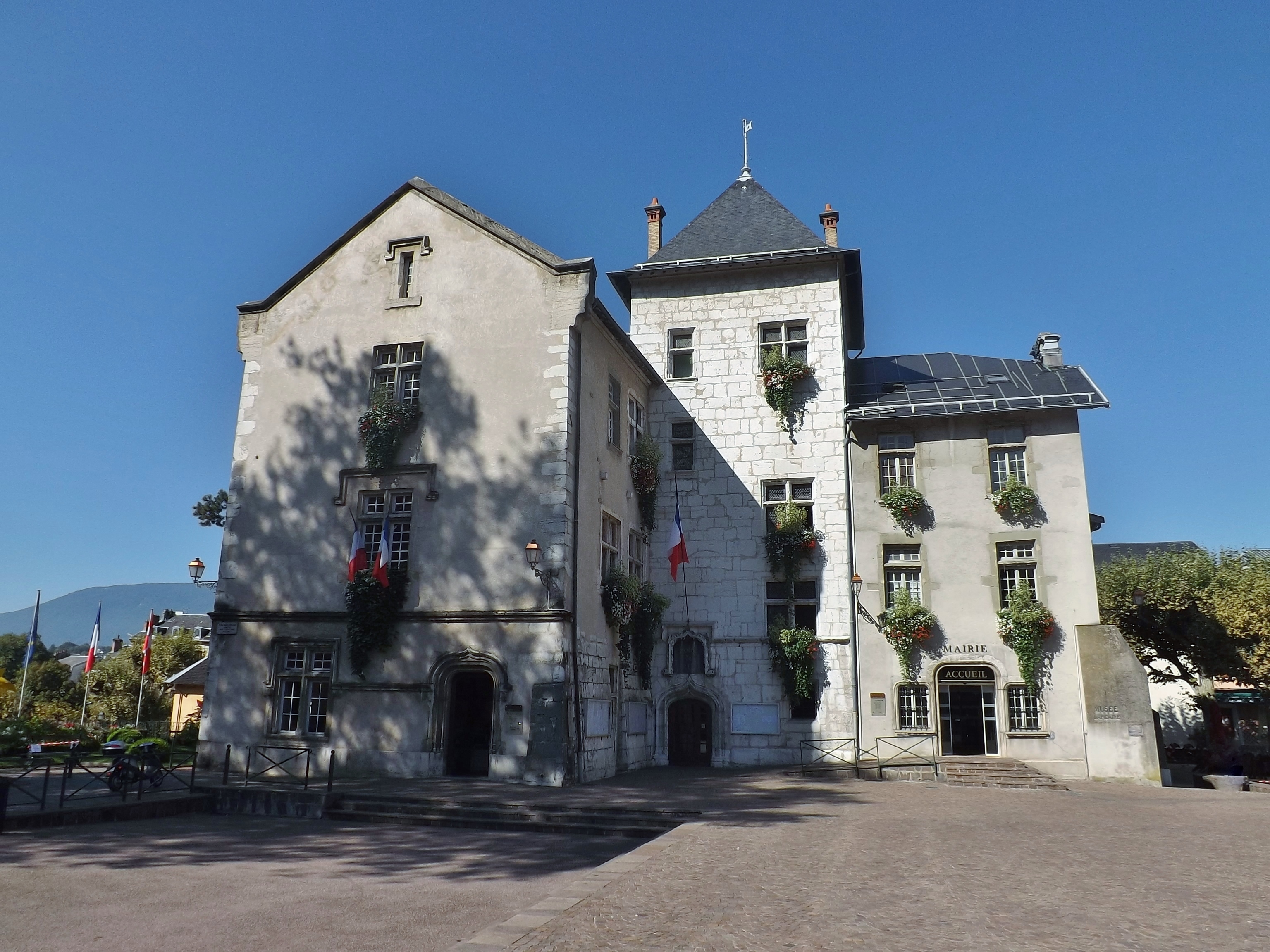
The Hôtel de Ville

Since the departmental elections in 2015, Aix-les-Bains is divided into two cantons, both involving other communes. These are the Canton of Aix-les-Bains-1 and the Canton of Aix-les-Bains-2.

The legislative constituency on which the Aix people depend is the First constituency of the Savoy. It is bounded by the redistricting law No. 86-1197 of 24 November 1986, and includes the following administrative divisions: The cantons of Aix-les-Bains-1, Aix-les-Bains-2, La Motte-Servolex and part of Le Pont-de-Beauvoisin.

Aix-les-Bains hosts several administrations and public services on its territory, such as a post office, a police headquarters, municipal police, national police, a gendarmerie, a national employment agency (renamed Pôle Emploi), a tax office, municipal kennel, homeowner associations, a communal centre for social action, a centre of social security, and a railway station. The Communauté d'agglomération du Lac du Bourget is also based in Aix-les-Bains.

The mayor of Aix-les-Bains has implemented three secondary offices for the town. There is the Sierroz office, the Marlioz office and finally the la Liberté office. These are a relay for the main services of the town. One can perform many administrative procedures but also requests for support and information. These offices are competent at giving, among other things, guidance for employment matters, an accompaniment to inhabitants' projects (mainly from the associative fabric), health, law, housing, culture, education and recreation. These decentralized local structures allow the dissemination of information on municipal projects as well as the future projects where the inhabitants can, if necessary, have the opportunity to be able to express their opinion.

=== Trends and political outcomes ===
See also 2014 municipal elections in Savoie

Politically, Aix-les-Bains is a town of the right, the electors have voted mostly right for municipal elections since 1979. The former mayor of the municipality from 1985 to 2001, Gratien Ferrari, although having been elected with centrist policies succeeded the outgoing mayor André Grosjean with whom he was one of the majority on the same municipal council. Similarly, Robert Barrier was a man of the centre-right. However, in the years 1920–1930, the city was the stronghold of the left in Savoy, carried by the workers in the Aix area.

In the Referendum on the Constitutional Treaty for Europe on 29 May 2005, Aix-les-Bains mostly voted in favour of the European Constitution Treaty, with 53.55% in favour, 46.45% against and a 34.97% abstention rate (entire France: No at 54.67%, with Yes at 45.33%). These figures were not consistent with the national trend, it being in opposition. This vote demonstrated the privileged nature of the inhabitants of the town compared to rural departments with significant pools of workers. The electorate had chosen the positive vote being due to having, according to political analysts, a more privileged population economically and a higher educational level.

At the 2007 French presidential election, the first round of voting saw Nicolas Sarkozy arrive in the lead with 37.8% or 5,904 votes, followed by François Bayrou with 20.64% or 3,286 votes, then Ségolène Royal with 20.24% or 3,223 votes, and finally Jean-Marie Le Pen with 10.92% or 1,739 votes, no other candidates exceeded the threshold of 5%. In the second round, the electors voted at 61.56% or 9,434 votes for Nicolas Sarkozy against 38.44% or 5,890 votes for Ségolène Royal, a result more right in relation to the national average that was, in the second round, 53.06% for Nicolas Sarkozy and 46.94% for Ségolène Royal. For this presidential election, the turnout rate was very high. There were 19,774 registered voters on electoral lists in Aix, 81.18% or 16,053 voters participated in the rounds, and the abstention rate was 18.82% or 3,721 votes, with 4.54% or 729 votes having a spoilt or unmarked ballot, and finally 95,46% or 15,324 votes were cast.

The regional elections in 2010 resulted in a gathering of the left and environmentalists in the lead (43.3%) before the UMP (40.5%) and the FN (16.2%), with a high abstention (54.2%).

=== Municipal administration ===
The Aix-les-Bains municipal council, as well as the municipal team, is composed of a mayor, ten deputy mayors, seven adviser delegates and seven other charges from missions to the deputy mayors. Six communal council seats are filled by elected representatives from the Aix de tout cœur [Wholehearted Aix] (SE) list, and those of the Aix avenir [Aix future] (KVD) list. To a greater extent, one can also count a random number of delegates of the municipal council from government agencies. The current mayor is also the Député for the first district of Savoy and a community advisor to the Communauté d'agglomération du Lac du Bourget [Community of the agglomeration of Lake Bourget].

Here is the share of the seats on the municipal council of Aix-les-Bains:

Party	Leader	Seats	Status
UMP	Dominique Dord	29	Majority
DVG	Fabrice Maucci	5	Opposition
Independent	Thibaut Guigue	1	Opposition

In the communal elections of March 2008, the participation rate for the first and only round of voting was low, with only 58.75% of voters. Of the 20,247 registered on electoral lists, 11,895 people voted and 11,453 voters spoke. The outgoing mayor Dominique Dord, topped the list Une ville d'avance [A town in advance], was re-elected with an absolute majority of 62.27%, or 7,132 votes. He was followed by the Various Left candidate Fabrice Maucci, head of the Aix avenir:durable, solidaire, exemplaire [Aix future: sustainable, solidarity, exemplary] list, who collected 28.12% of the vote, or 3,221 votes. Finally, in third position, the former UDF Mayor of Aix Gratien Ferrari, head of the Aix de tout cœur [Wholehearted Aix] list, who was presented without a label, and won 9.6%, or 1,100 votes.

In the municipal elections of March 2014, Dominique Dord (UMP) was re-elected in the first round with 59.71% of the vote. He was opposed by three other candidates: Véronique Drapeau (FN) (15.33%), André Giménez (KVD) (12.98%) and Fabrice Maucci (FG) (11.96%).

In October 2018, Dominique Dord resigned from his position of mayor and Renaud Beretti, his deputy, replaced him.

=== List of mayors ===
Here is the list of mayors of Aix-les-Bains:

List of mayors from 1956
Start	End	Name	Party	Other details
October 2018	In progress	Renaud Beretti	LR	
March 2001	October 2018	Dominique Dord	UMP	Deputy of the first district of Savoy
March 1995	March 2001	André Grosjean	RPR	Retired, General Counsel
March 1985	March 1995	Gratien Ferrari	UDF-AD	College Principal, Deputy of the first district of Savoy
1983	1985	André Grosjean	RPR	Retired, General Counsel
1977	1983	André Grosjean	RPR	Industrial, General Counsel
1971	1977	André Grosjean		Industrial, General Counsel
1969	1971	André Grosjean		Industrial, General Counsel
January 1956	1963	Lucien Spycher		

List of mayors from 1860 to 1955
Start	End	Name	Party	Other details
1953	December 1955	Robert Barrier	UDSR	General Council Chair and Member
1947	1953	Paul Dussuel		Industrial pharmacist
1944	1947	Calixte Salvador	Radical Socialist	Former resistance
1937	1944	Paul Dussuel		Industrial pharmacist
1932	1937 (resigned)	Maurice Mollard	Radical socialist	Engineer of Public Works, Senator of Savoy
1927	1932	Henri Clerc	Radical socialist	Journalist, writer
1919	1927	Philippe Navarro	SFIO	Public servant
1913	1919	Albert Marty	Radical	Medical doctor
1912	1913 (resigned)	Léon Blanc	Republican	Medical doctor
1900	1912	Joseph Mottet	Radical moderate	Entrepreneur; Proprietor of the Villa de Fleurs, Domaine de Marlioz
1892	1900	François Gimet	Radical left and radical socialist	
1886	1892	Paul Bonna		Masonry Contractor
1884	1886	Joseph Petit	Radical	Medical doctor
1875	1884	Alphonse Mottet	Republican moderate	Public works contractor
1863	1875	Gaspard Davat	Centre-right	Medical doctor
1861 (by Imperial decree)	1863	Jacques-Prosper Degallion		
1860	1861	Pierre-François Brachet		Merchant, Manager of Grand Port

=== Legal proceedings ===
The town of Aix-les-Bains has several judicial courts: which will be soon merged with that of Chambéry following the reform of the judicial map initiated on 27 June 2007, an industrial tribunal and a House of Justice and the Law Council. With regard to other judicial proceedings, the Aix area depends on the city of Chambéry. Following judicial cutting, Aix-les-Bains is dependent of the Court of Appeal of Chambéry, the High Court of Chambéry, of the juvenile court, the Commercial Court of Chambéry, the Social Security Affairs Tribunal of the Savoy and the Chamber of Attorneys the Court of Appeal of Chambéry.

=== Environmental policy ===
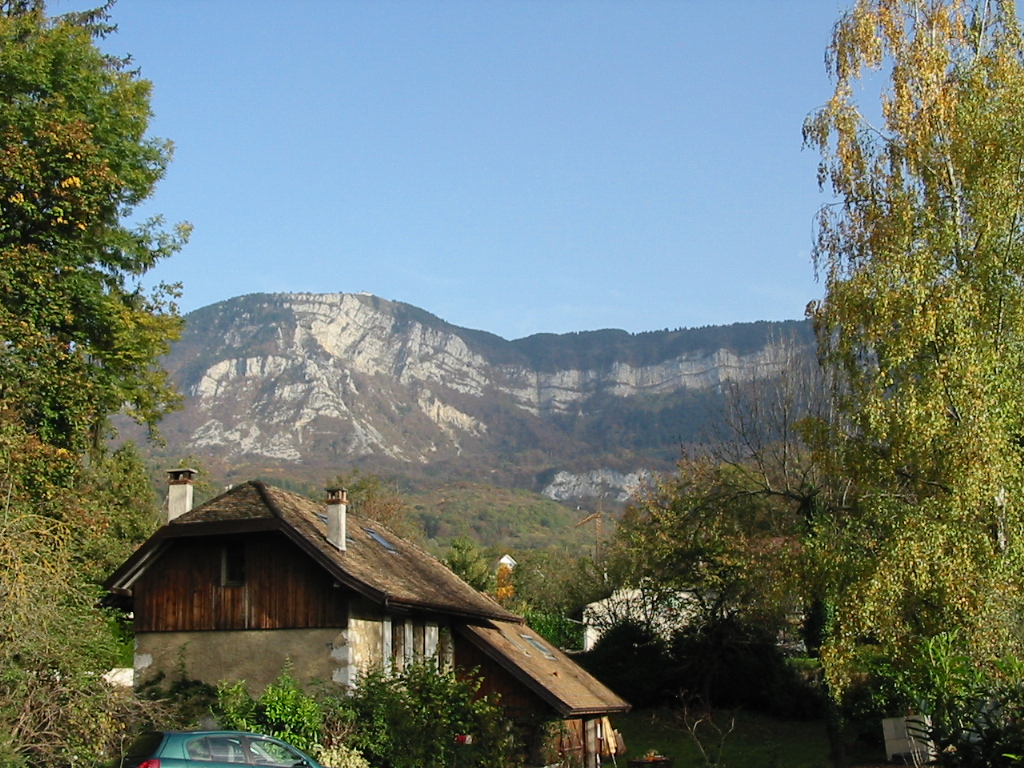
Traditional house opposite Mont Revard

On the Lac du Bourget, with several thousand people in addition to tens of thousands of tourists, the water quality had gradually deteriorated from the 1950s to 1970 in a major phenomenon of eutrophication, since the lake at the time was the natural outlet of all sewer pipes, with in particular, Chambéry and Aix-les-Bains. Many motor vehicles of the time were also highly polluting, spitting their fumes which partially dissolved in the waters and spilt oil which was also found in the lake. They made a lot of noise and noise generated was damaging to birds and small mammals. A remediation action has been engaged since the mid-1970s, in order to reduce the eutrophication of the lake, the aim being to arrive at the same results as for Lake Annecy.

Services of water treatment stations have been established in Savoy and in particular to Aix-les-Bains. Rivers such as the Tillet and the Sierroz have thus been remediated, improving upon the quality of the waters of the lake and the regeneration of aquatic species. Aix-les-Bains has a public aquarium for the conservation of local species such as trout, Arctic char and carp. This establishment mainly specialises in freshwater fish. The Aquarium du Lac du Bourget allows not only to help the local wildlife conservation but also for prevention work and educational visits.

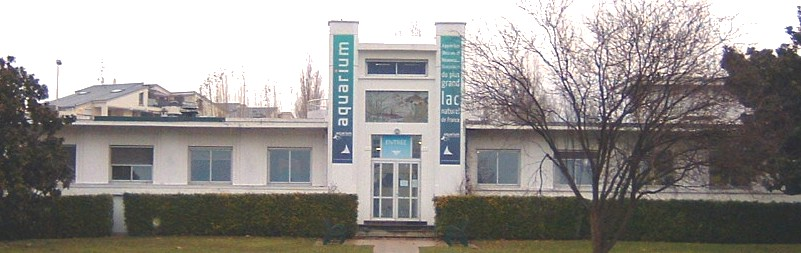
The Lac du Bourget Aquarium in Aix-les-Bains, an Art Deco-style building

The city also offers trails marked and arranged allowing hikers to travel in the direction of Mont Revard. These courses are used by athletes, walkers and cyclists. These paths are regularly maintained, eliminating the spread of detritus in green spaces. The municipality also has a municipal park, the Parc du Bois Vidal. Here there are also many trails. The desire was to create a forest here without pomp, where nature evolves freely.

Many events are held at Aix-les-Bains. The convention centre, the Casino Grand-Cercle or even the Victoria Cinema contribute to the special conferences, such as for broadcasts of documentaries, films and ecology. Between 27 and 29 September 2005 the first national water meeting was organized. The municipality wanted to, through organised days, increase the exchange of information and experiences for greater synergy in the field of preservation and protection of water. It also created and published the Charter of Environmental Quality and Accessibility at construction sites. This charter aims to reduce and limit pollution caused by urban sites such as noise pollution, waste products and water and soil pollution.

== Twin towns – sister cities ==
Aix-les-Bains is twinned with:

- Milena, Italy
- Moulay Yacoub, Morocco
- Zhangjiajie, China

== Population and society ==
Historical population

Year	Pop.	±% p.a.
1793	1,415	—
1800	1,596	+1.73%
1806	2,018	+3.99%
1822	2,813	+2.10%
1838	3,556	+1.48%
1848	3,850	+0.80%
1858	4,116	+0.67%
1861	4,253	+1.10%
1866	4,373	+0.56%
1872	4,182	−0.74%
1876	4,399	+1.27%
1881	4,741	+1.51%
1886	5,580	+3.31%
1891	6,296	+2.44%
1896	8,328	+5.75%
1901	8,120	−0.50%
1906	8,679	+1.34%

Year	Pop.	±% p.a.
1911	8,934	+0.58%
1921	8,764	−0.19%
1926	11,563	+5.70%
1931	13,020	+2.40%
1936	12,889	−0.20%
1946	14,556	+1.22%
1954	15,680	+0.93%
1962	18,132	+1.83%
1968	20,627	+2.17%
1975	22,210	+1.06%
1982	23,451	+0.78%
1990	24,683	+0.64%
1999	25,732	+0.46%
2007	27,267	+0.73%
2012	28,729	+1.05%
2017	29,794	+0.73%
2023	32,406	+1.41%

Source: EHESS and INSEE (1968-2023)

As of 2023, the population of Aix-les-Bains is older than the average of Savoie.

Age structure of the city of Aix-les-Bains in 2020:

Population by age of Aix-les-Bains, 2023 (%)

80+	8.9
65–79	19
55–64	13.5
40–54	18.2
25–39	17.4
15–24	10.4
0–14	12.8

Total: 100.2

male

female

Source: INSEE

Population by age of Savoie, 2023 (%)

90+	6.3
75–89	15.7
60–74	13.3
45–59	19.8
30–44	17.7
15–29	10.8
0–14	16.4

Total: 100

male

female

Source: INSEE

As of 2020, the total number of households in Aix-les-Bains is 16,467. The average household size was 1.85. 49.1% of the households contained one person, 23.9% were couples without children, 16.5% were couples with children and 8.8% were single-parent households.

=== Education ===
Aix-les-Bains makes several educational facilities available to residents of the town including seven nursery schools and nine public elementary schools; with a kindergarten and two primary schools under private contract. Common public kindergartens include: in the centre of Aix-les-Bains, Franklin Roosevelt, la Liberté - Aix-les-Bains, Lafin - Aix-les-Bains, the Sierroz, Marlioz - Aix-les-Bains and Saint-Simond. Also, the Boncelin public primary school. Public elementary schools which are present include le Choudy, du Centre, Franklin Roosevelt, la Liberté, Lafin, Le Sierroz, Marlioz and Saint Simond. In the private sector, but under contract, there is the Gazouillis kindergarten and the primary schools of Lamartine and St. Joseph.

The town has three public collèges for lower secondary education, which are Garibaldi, Jean-Jacques Perret and Marlioz. There are three private colleges under contract namely Lamartine Catholic college, the la Ribambelle college and the Talmudic college. Aix-les-Bains has only one public lycée general, technological and professional which is the Lycée Marlioz, which also offers many post-secondary education qualifications (vocational baccalaureate, BTS notary or trade).

In the private sector, non-contract is an established private technology ITCC school and two private schools under contract, namely the Talmudic lycée general and the Tomer Deborah lycée general. There is also the presence of a lycée professionnel under private contract, the la Savoisienne lycée professionnel.

The town also hosts other training institutions. Examples include the teaching academic section LPO Marlioz, SEGPA CLG Marlioz, the Municipal Conservatory of Music and, since 2006, the Peyreffite Graduate School.

=== Cultural events and festivities ===
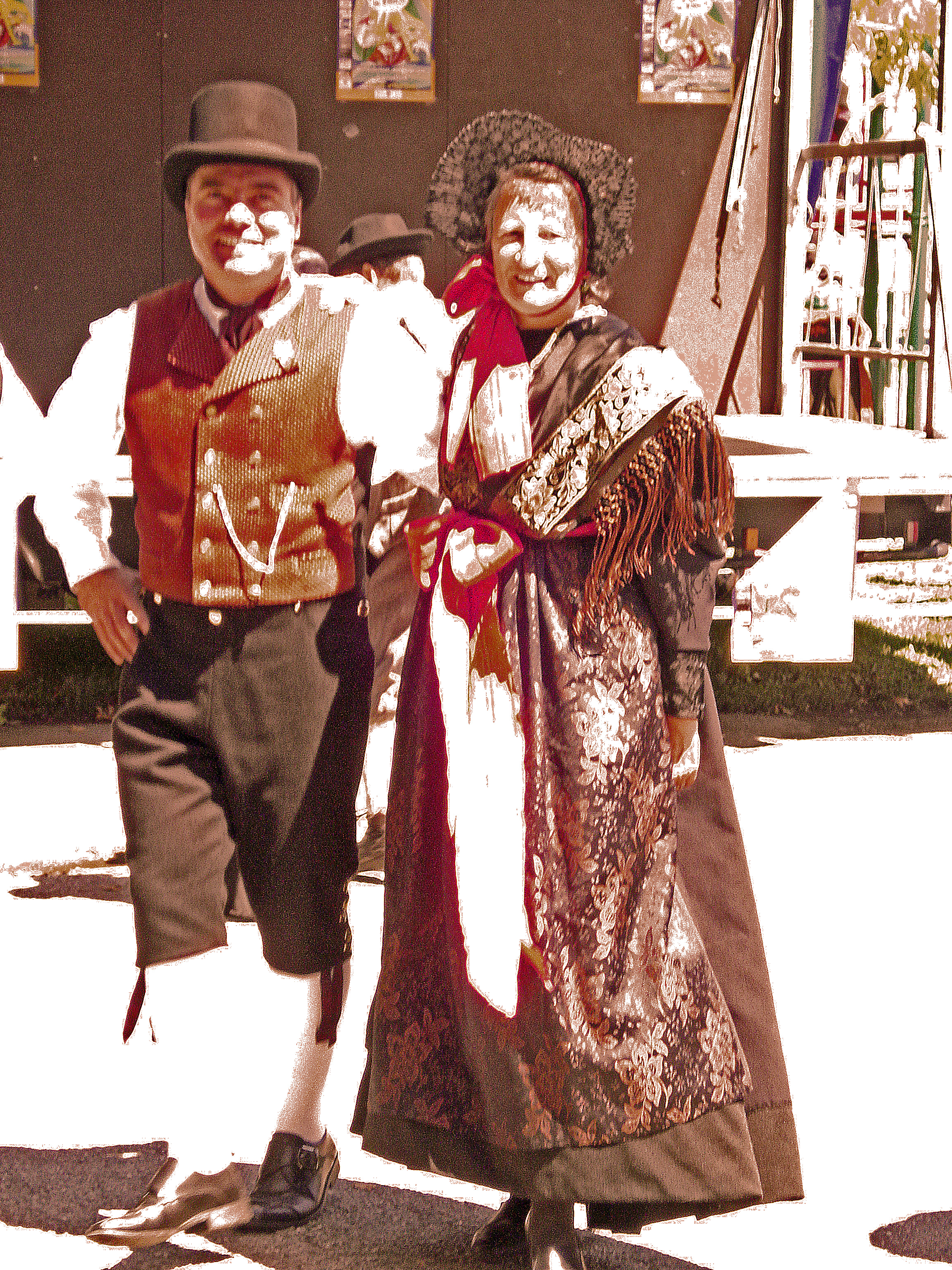
The Festival of the Lake at Aix-les-Bains

Several festivals are organised in the town of Aix-les-Bains, with the following being the most significant:

- The Rock Musilac Festival (July)
- The Festival Aix Operettes (July)
- The Festival of Clairvoyance (August)
- The Festival of Romantic Nights of the Lac du Bourget (October)
- The Writers in Series Festival (October)
- The Aix-les-Bains Festival of Francophone Scrabble (November)
- The Festival d'Art Lyrique of Aix les Bains (November)

Each year, other events also take place in the Aix area such as:

- The Night of the Museums (May)
- The Acquascenies (July)
- The Navig'Aix (August)
- The Biennale Charles Dullin (November)

=== Health ===
A public general hospital is located in the commune. It is ranked 16th in the national rank for the treatment of rheumatoid arthritis. The town also has the Queen Hortense Hospital for Rheumatology. There are about forty doctors of all disciplines present in the city.

There is also the Gustav Zander Centre for functional rehabilitation and care. This is an independent private clinic. Its capacity is 40 beds of complete hospitalisation, with forty day case places. The specialties of this centre are, primarily, for functional rehabilitation and motor rehabilitation, traumatology, orthopedics, neurology and cardio-vascular diseases. It was authorized to increase its capacity with fifteen new beds and 15 additional places. This extension was expected to be operational in 2008.

Another institution in the Aix area is the Herbert Clinic (Générale de santé). It has a capacity of eighty-four beds and places of which seventy-five are surgical beds and nine outpatient surgery places. This clinic is for specialty surgery and is particularly present in the practice of anaesthesia-resuscitation, gynecological surgery, maxillofacial surgery, plastic and aesthetics, orthopaedic surgery, upper limb orthopaedic surgery and surgery of the hand, surgery of the spine – neurosurgery, vascular, and thoracic surgery, urologic Surgery and, finally, visceral surgery.

A renowned spa town, the thermalistes institutions of the town must be mentioned many of which provide medical care. The Thermes Chevalley of Aix-les-Bains, found in this area, specialises in rheumatology and phlebology. The Marlioz Spa specialises in the diseases of the respiratory tract and throat diseases.

Aix-les-Bains is the first spa town in France to be part of 84 towns and intercommunal structures of the French network of the World Health Organization's (WHO) group of healthy cities. This implies the adherence of the commune to the WHO doctrine of health for all. The association of the French network of WHO healthy cities was established in 1990, and the Aix-les-Bains commune joined in 2008.

=== Sport ===
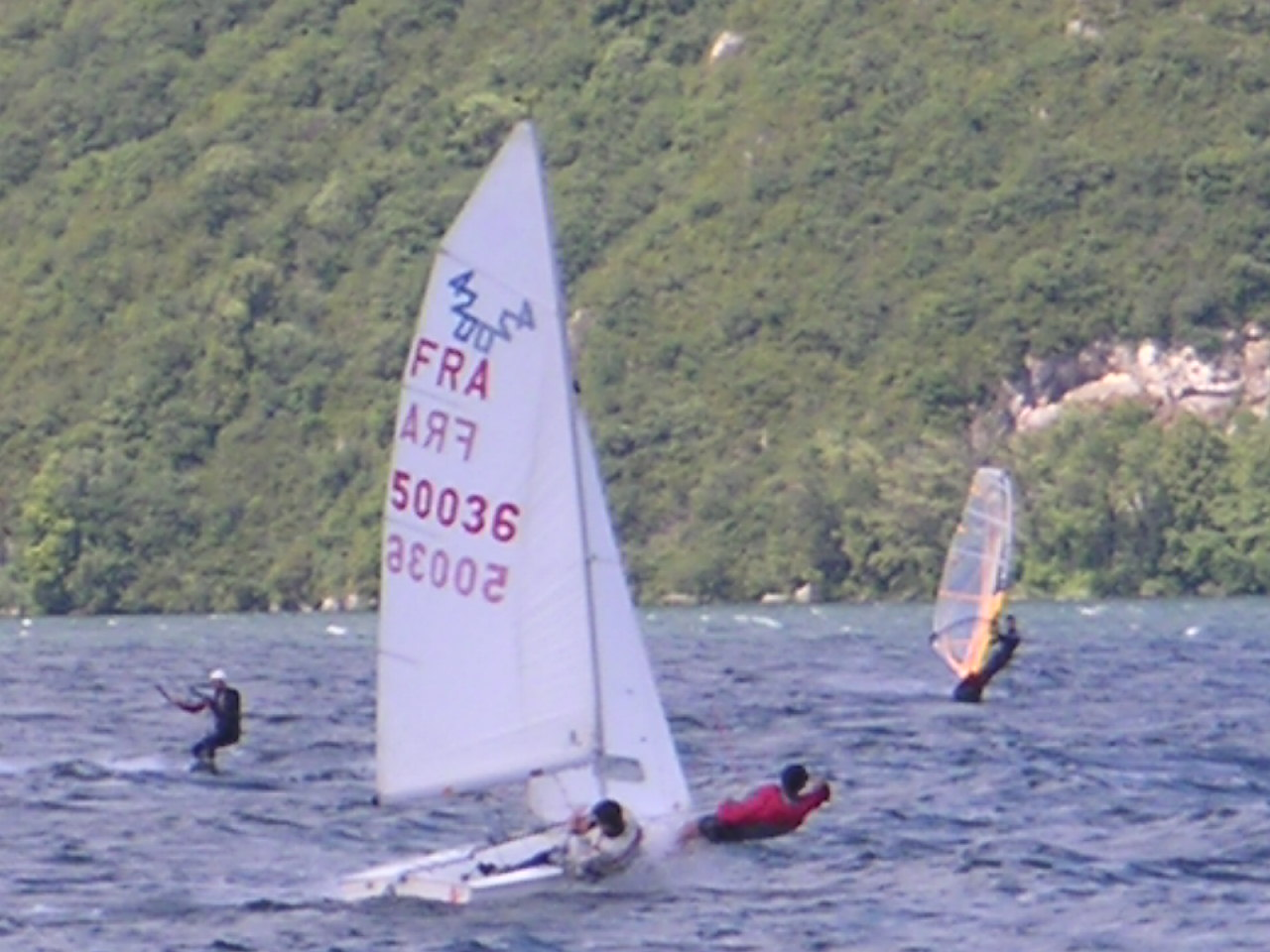
Sailing and windsurfing on the Lac du Bourget

Aix-les-Bains is a very active city in the field of sport. There are about eighty-two associations in direct connection with sport. More than fifty different sports can be practiced in the commune. Among others this includes waterskiing, motor sports, taekwondo, tennis, archery, sailing, volleyball, water polo, and handball. Further sports include judo, karate, swimming with the Cercle des nageurs d'Aix-les-Bains swimming club, boating, paragliding, petanque, scuba, rugby union, athletics, rowing with the Nautical and rowing agreement of Aix-les-Bains, basketball with the club Aix Maurienne Savoie Basket and boxing. Fencing, football, golf with the Aix-les-Bains international golf course of 18 holes on an area of 45 hectares (110 acres), strewn with natural obstacles and crossed by a river, the Tillet, gymnastics and many other sports are also practiced.

Horse racing takes places at the Hippodrome de Marlioz racecourse and the Société des courses of Aix-les-Bains [Racing Society of Aix-les-Bains]. The Marlioz racetrack has hosted public events for more than a century. The Marlioz track, ranked '1st category gallop' and '2nd category trot', has large grandstands, a panoramic lounge and an open-air restaurant.

Cycling includes two races which are organized in the town by the Amical Cycle Aixois [the Aix-les-Bains cycling club], with an Easter prize and a night prize. Aix-les-Bains is one of the cities having been included more often, 18 times, in the Critérium du Dauphiné. The Tour de France has also had stage finishes in Aix-les-Bains on numerous occasions. Since World War II, amongst other appearances in the race, the town has had a stage finish in the event in 1948, 1951, 1954, 1958, 1965, 1972, 1974, 1989, 1991, 1996, 1998 and 2001.

The municipality operates several sports services such as the municipal sports school, the municipal office of sports, this sports office should not be confused with the previous service, and finally the centre nautique municipal, the beach and pool of Aix-les-Bains.

Between 1949 and 1961, the town was very present in motorsports, thanks to the Aix-les-Bains Circuit du Lac [Lake race track]. The circuit was situated by the Lac du Bourget. With a length of 2.4 kilometres (1.5 mi), it was around the place where the crossroads of the lake now is. It was the only automobile circuit of Savoy. Events for Formula 2, Formula Junior and Grand Prix motorcycle racing were held. It attracted local drivers and spectators but also people from Switzerland, Italy and England. The geographical situation lent itself readily to the practice of cycling.

On 30 March 2013, the Group B final of the European Championships took place. Rugby U18 was held at Aix-les-Bains between the Netherlands and Croatia. The Dutch team won with 51 points against 3 and took the title.

=== Media ===
The press is represented mainly by the large regional dailies and, in particular, Le Dauphiné libéré. More locally, there is quite a rich press, with La Vie nouvelle, La Savoie, L'Essor savoyard, Le Messager, La Voix des Allobroges, Le Faucigny and many others. In addition to the national radio stations, the town is covered by many local stations including France Bleu Pays de Savoie, ODS radio, HotRadio and Hellebore. TV8 Mont-Blanc local television broadcasts across the Pays de Savoie. A regular show is La place du village, which highlights local life in the Aix area. This is also the case in the local information of the same television channel, as well as on France 3 in the local and regional edition.

== Economy ==
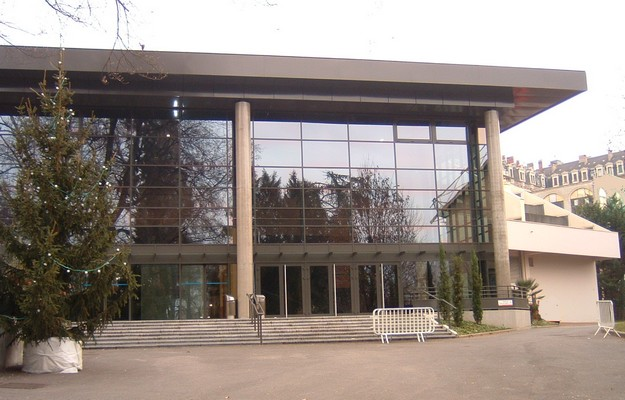
The Aix-les-Bains Convention Centre

Essentially a spa town until the mid-20th century, Aix-les-Bains has gradually transformed its local economy and is no longer dependent on the thermal baths which are less frequently used than before. Like the cities of Vichy, Évian and other spas, Aix-les-Bains has diversified the economy and invested a lot on tourism potential and health. In 2000, the commune had a network of 34 stations classified by the label of France Station Nautique. It also obtained the label of Station Touristique at the end of October 2013.

=== Revenues of the population and taxation ===
The average income per household in Aix-les-Bains is about €15,606 per year. However, this number does not reflect the reality for the majority of Aix-les-Bains households whose earnings are modest, or even precariously low. The share of households taxed in 2005 was 66.8%. The number of indebted taxpayers of the wealth tax is two hundred and twelve. The average wealth tax for the commune is approximately €4,091 per year which is slightly lower than the national average which has an average tax of €5,683 per year. With respect to the mean wealth of those liable to pay the Solidarity tax on wealth, it amounts locally to €1,338,548 per year compared to €1,493,167 per year for the average national.

Income tax in 2003

	Taxable households (%)	Average income per household in €	Average income per taxable household in €	Average pension amount in €	Pensioners and pensions (%)
Aix-les-Bains south	66	22,269	29,409	19,979	30
Aix-les-Bains town	53	15,845	23,693	17,973	37
Aix-north-Grésy	62	20,327	27,724	18,876	31
Savoy	57	16,911	24,215	16,897	31
France	52	16,827	25,912	16,883	31
Source: Ministry of Finance

Canton according to the social development of territories Aix-les-Bains

	Share of beneficiaries of the RMI per 1000 inhabitants	Number of beneficiaries with low income	Number of persons covered by low income beneficiaries	As a % of the total population 1999	Recipients of the RMI	
	Share of beneficiaries of the RMI per 1000 inhabitants	Number of beneficiaries with low income	Number of persons covered by low income beneficiaries	As a % of the total population 1999	31 December 2000	31 December 2004
Aix-les-Bains south	5.4	231	603	5.7	57	57
Aix-les-Bains town	16.9	1,378	3,043	11.8	383	435
Aix-north-Grésy	3.4	156	369	4.9	26	25
Savoy	9.3	13,126	30,380	8.1	3,403	3,463
Source: Chamber of commerce and industry of Savoy

The local municipality direct tax rate for 2007 follows. This rate includes the rate of council tax on developed property rates, the no-property tax rate and frame rate of the business tax. The rate of council tax rises at municipal level to 13.82%, in the intercommunal level to 0%, and at the departmental level to 4.92%. The developed land rate amounts to a municipal level of 25.04%, the intercommunal level at 0%, with 7.46% at the departmental level, and 2.07% at the regional level. The undeveloped land rate amounted to 42.08% at the municipal level, the inter-communal level at 0%, the departmental level at 29.37%, and the regional level at 5.15%. In terms of the rate of business tax, the municipal level is at 0%, the intercommunal level at 20.12%, the departmental level at 9.09%, and the regional level is at 2.43%.

=== Employment ===
The commune of Aix-les-Bains had approximately 14,086 total jobs (employee + self-employed) in 1999, including 1,039 salaried jobs. The average annual rate of change of total employment, between 1990 and 1999, was 0.07%. The number of jobseekers (categories 1-2-3-HAR) on 31 December 2006 was 1,412 with a 13.7% unemployment rate. The rate of activity for those between 20 and 59 years of age stood at 82%, which equals the national average of 82.2%. There were 42.9% of working age against 24.3% of retirees whose number is well above the national average of 18.2%. There were 20.5% of school age and 12.2% of people without activity.

Distribution of employment by industry

	Agriculture	Artisans, merchants and entrepreneurs	Executives, intellectual professions	Associate professionals	Employees	Manual workers
Aix-les-Bains	0.1%	8.8%	10.5%	23.6%	34%	23%
National average	2.4%	6.4%	12.1%	22.1%	29.9%	27.1%
Source: INSEE

The municipality has many structures to help job seekers in their approaches and their career as well as for guidance. A national agency for employment is present as well as a local mission specialising in orientation and workshops of discovery in the world of employment. Also included is the "Association for the Development of Social Promotion", a training body, but also a permanent home for information and guidance, and a centre for information and orientation.

=== Companies of the agglomeration ===
The companies and institutions total at 1 January 2006 was 2,624. Aix-les-Bains had reached a number of 198 new businesses for the year 2004. It lay at 216th position in the national ranking. There are mainly thirteen types of institutions. Agricultural and food industry institutions represent 3.3% of the total number of companies with a number of 58. Consumer goods industries represent 1.7% with twenty-nine institutions, car industries are two companies at about 0.1% of the companies. Capital goods industries have a share of 1.5% with twenty-seven companies. The intermediate goods industry includes twenty companies or 1.1 per cent, energy amounts to 0.1% with its two companies. Construction has 135 companies representing 7.7%, trade represents no less than 28.4% of the total number of companies with four hundred and ninety-six institutions. Transportation includes forty-three institutions or 2.5 per cent, real estate activities totalled sixty seventeen companies or 4.4 per cent. Services to the companies represent 12.4% with two hundred and sixteen institutions. Services to individuals include two hundred eighty-two companies at around 20.6% and, finally, with respect to the last type of school education, health and social action there are 282 companies or 16.1% of the total number of establishments.

The four main businesses present in the town of Aix-les-Bains are Léon Grosse with a turnover of 627 million Euros (consolidated 2008, given to "Léon Grosse"), Aixam with a turnover of 74 million Euros, Aixam production, which is an entity independent of Aixam, with a turnover of 47 million Euros and ABB Process Automation with 50 million Euros of turnover (2003 figure). The Aix area includes many other companies. Among other things, also present in Aix-les-Bains, are the Savoie-Yaourt (Savoy yoghurt) business, the Société des eaux minérales d'Aix-les-Bains which is a mineral water producer, the Cavaillé company in the wine field, the company Areva as well as the manufacture of high-quality leather goods, the Bauer Compressor Company, and the company Clipsol which is very in vogue thanks to its production of solar heating. Moreover, in recent years the hospitality sector has tended to develop. Hospitality giant Accor is particularly present in the area of Aix, in order to benefit from the growth of health markets and hydrotherapy.

=== Trade ===
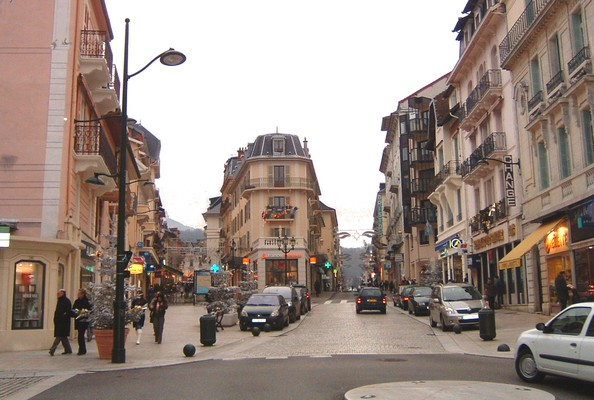
The town centre of Aix-les-Bains

Aix-les-Bains has nearly 500 shops. These are, for the largest number, present in the town centre. Merchants benefit from the attractiveness of the geographical situation of the commune with the proximity of the lake and the Massif des Bauges, but also thanks to the casino. However, its aging image as well as competition from neighbouring communes tend to undermine the Aix shops. Indeed, the peripheral communes such as Tresserve, Grésy-sur-Aix, Albens or even Le Bourget-du-Lac attract ever slightly more local clientele. On the other hand, the Chambéry area is facing competition from the area of activity of Les Landiers, where most of the big names are, such as Darty, la Halle aux vêtements, Feu vert, but also the large Carrefour hypermarket. This presence has forced the town of Chambéry to revitalize its own town centre. Aix-les-Bains shops have, in this general situation, struggled to survive and attract potential customers.

However, the Aix-les-Bains municipality became aware of this state of affairs. A Fisac record has been opened. The city has set many objectives and measures. For example, to include the creation of an office of trade and crafts, which organises special events à la carte, the creation of an internet site, support for food shops, the study of facilities in the south of the town as well as on the improvement of the bond between the Lac du Bourget and the town centre, the valuation of public space, and more generally the improvement of communication and the development of multiple channels of information for advice.

=== Hydrotherapy ===
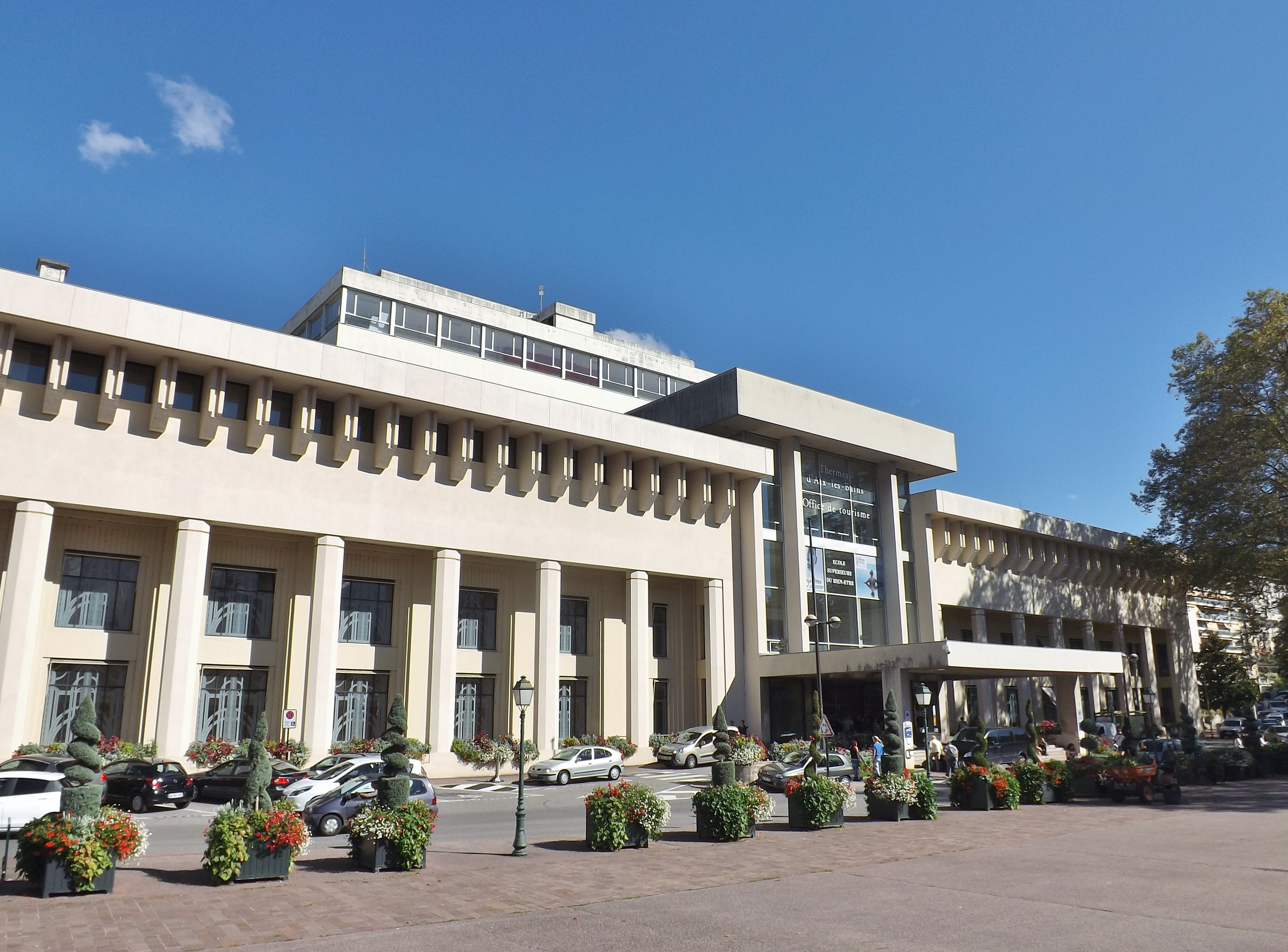
National Thermal Baths at Aix- les-Bains.

Springs, gushing on the hillsides, through two holes in the cliff, were already known to the Celts (the Allobroges tribe), who worshipped them under the auspices of the god Borvo. Attached to the city of Vienne, after the conquest of Caesar, the Roman vicus of Aquae (Aix) grew around a first-class bathing establishment, continually improved and expanded. Therefore, this tradition of baths was permanently preserved over the centuries. There are also testimonies of the presence of King Henry IV in 1600, who washed in the unique Roman swimming pool still accessible at the time, called the Royal Bath. In 1783, through the subsidies of Victor Amadeus III, a first modern thermal hotel was built. These thermal baths, several times enlarged (1818 to 1856–1860), naturally became the national baths during the incorporation of Savoy into France in 1860. New buildings completed the complex in 1897, and especially in 1934. In 1996, a new state institution, the Thermes Chevalley were inaugurated, relying on several new deep catchment sources.

The underground travel of the waters, from the opposite shore of the lake (more than thirty years at 2 kilometres (1.2 mi) deep), explains its temperature of 46°. Many sources provide calcium, sulphated, silica-rich waters which are very slightly radioactive at 45° or cold, and finally with bicarbonates. They, according to their origin and their temperature, are used either for showers or baths, in a swimming-pool, or to drink. These warm waters are especially indicated for degenerative rheumatism such as lumbar or cervical arthritis, osteoarthritis, sciatica, acute lumbago, recurrent arthritis of the hands, knee osteoarthritis, and for inflammatory rheumatism and spontylarthrite rheumatism. The use of sources is also beneficial for the algodystrophy, tendonitis, and phlebological problems (chronic venous insufficiency, suites and sequelae of thrombosis, lymphatic insufficiency, Raynaud's disease), on the other hand, these waters are contraindicated for the varicose ulcer, stroke or recent cardiac events. The cure techniques are the use of showers, individual enclosure (Berthollet), physiotherapy, mud application, underwater showers, and rehabilitation in a swimming pool. By their calming of the nervous system, the waters can cause euphoric relaxation.

The Thermes Chevalley

The national baths of Aix-les-Bains consist of two buildings located on two very distinct sites. Thus the Thermes Pellegrini and the Thermes Chevalley Spa facilities are located on the height.

There is also the Marlioz Spa. This is located in a park of 10 hectares (25 acres). It uses water from springs discovered around 1850. A first private institution was built in 1860, then entirely rebuilt in 1980. This spa is particularly suitable for the release of the respiratory system and heals diseases of the mouth. Treated ENT diseases are otitis, rhinitis, sinusitis, the pharyngitis, tonsillitis, the laryngitis, surgical preparations and post-surgical in ENT. Also treated are pathologies in pneumology, tracheitis, bronchitis, bronchial dilation and finally asthma.

Thanks to its thermal baths, in 1986, the town had around 52,000 hydrotherapy visitors and 1992, more than 44,550 hydrotherapy visitors. Since the year 2000, as a result of the disappearance of the agreements with the social security, attendance has decreased. Aix-les-Bains hosted approximately 35,200 hydrotherapy visitors for the year 2005. This number represents about 7% of all spa guests in France and 60% of the Savoy hydrotherapy visitors. Between the year 2004 and 2005, a significant decrease of 3% in the rate of attendance was found. March 2008 began with a serious conflict between staff and management which resulted in a strike. Since 2007, the direction of the National Baths of Aix-les-Bains conducted a deliberate policy to revitalize attendance and privatise the facility. This privatisation should be effective in the course of the year 2009.

== Local culture and heritage ==
Aix-les-Bains is an integral part of the Savoy. A tourist resort, the culture is mixed between its food and its communal history. Its heritage is an anthology of influences from many historical invasions. It owes much to its status as a spa town which in the Belle Epoque allowed it to boom and offered it a rich and varied heritage capital. Therefore, it is classified as a City of Art and History.

=== Places and monuments ===
With its rich past and its recent evolution, the commune of Aix-les-Bains has an important and varied heritage. The commune has seventeen monuments listed as monument historique and over 900 listed within the General Inventory of Cultural Heritage. In addition, it has 56 objects listed in the Inventory of Historic Monuments and thirteen listed within the General Inventory of Cultural Heritage.

Heritage was also the subject of studies by the Directorate of Culture of the region of Rhône-Alpes in its series Les dossiers de l'inventaire (Études sur le patrimoine) [The inventory files (heritage studies)]. It has no less than 1163 buildings which have thus retained some attention.

==== Casino Grand-Cercle ====
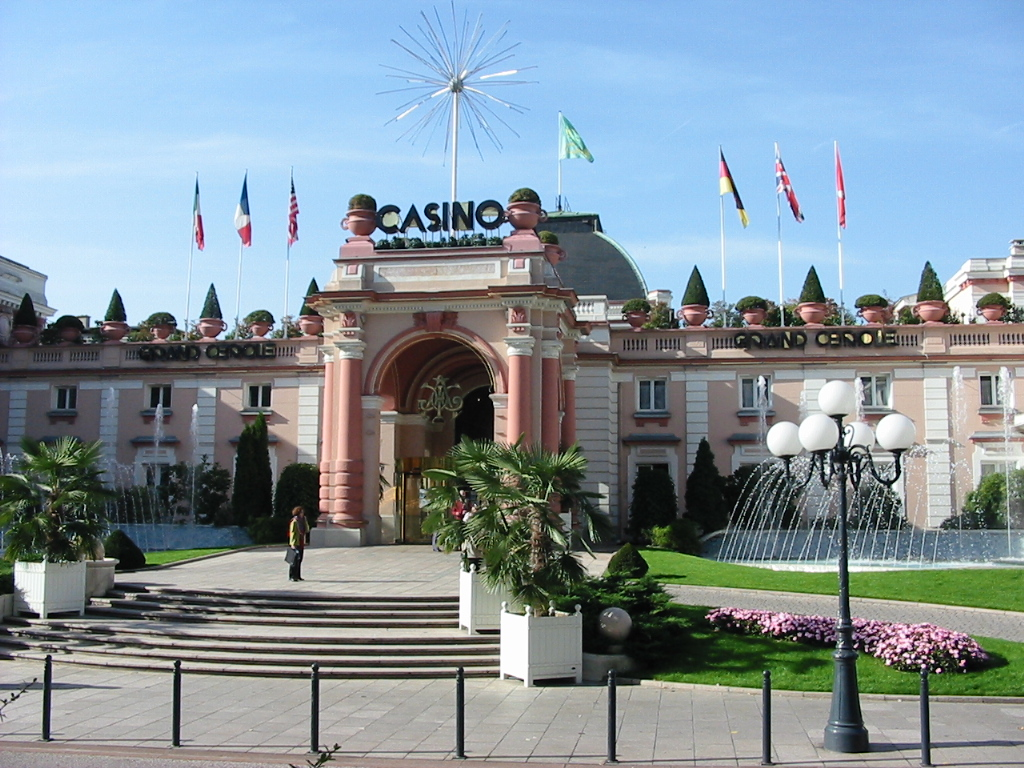
The Casino Grand-Cercle

The Casino Grand-Cercle is located in Aix-les-Bains, and constitutes a major architectural complex in Savoy, in the same way as the casino of Évian. The casino was opened in 1850 by the King Victor Emmanuel II, Duke of Savoy. The ceiling of his living room is covered with a mosaic of 3.5 million small cubes of glass mounted on a golden background. At the time, the building included a ballroom at its centre, flanked by two rooms, one for games, the other for reading and correspondence. Thirty years later, the casino had gained momentum and was expanded with two side pavilions. In 1899, the building acquired a 900-seat theatre, equipped with wooden machinery. Recently four works by the painter Di Credico were placed in the room of traditional games (boules, roulette, blackjack, etc.). The Casino Grand-Cercle was ranked at 24th in the classification of French casinos, on the basis of its gross product from the games for the fiscal year of 2004–2005.

==== Château of the Rock of the King ====
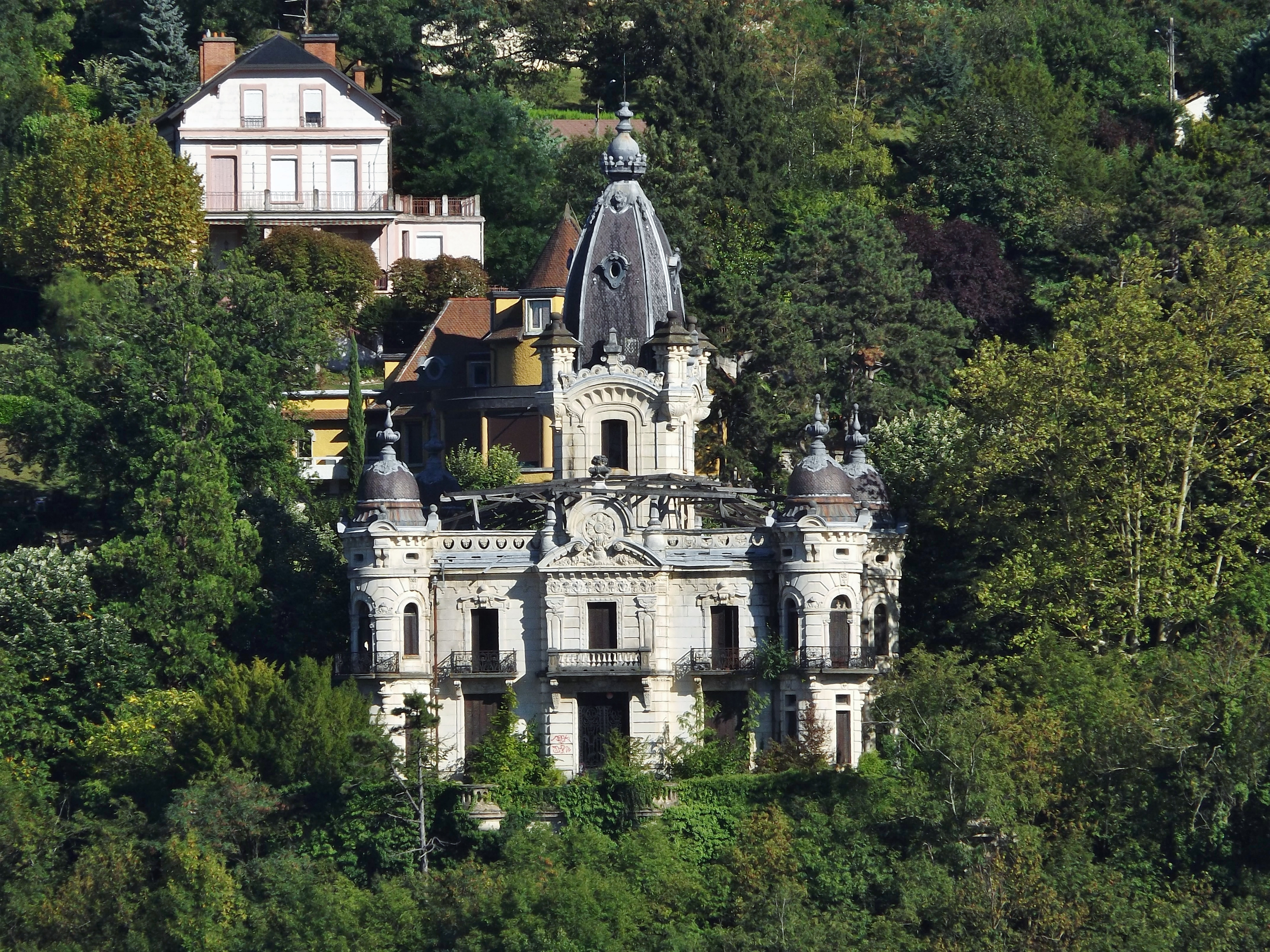
The Château de la Roche du Roi [Château of the Rock of the King]

The Château of the Rock of the King is a 20th-century château. It is located on the heights of Aix-les-Bains, built on a hillside, the château dominates much of the town and overlooks the racecourse and golf course among others. It was built in 1900 by the architect of the town, Jules Pin Sr. as well as by the Léon Grosse company. This château is now a classified historical monument. Its architectural style is a mix of oriental palaces and châteaux of the Renaissance. The total area of the building is approximately 500 square metres (5,400 sq ft). It is built on a terrace supported by a vaulted semicircular basement. Outside of the château, in its periphery, is a dense forest of many hundreds of trees, brush, and plants common to the region. The château currently belongs to a foreign private owner. The town attempted to acquire the building after noting that it was abandoned for many years, and after several major damages had been reported and multiple interventions by firefighters called to deal with fires.

==== The Church of Our Lady ====
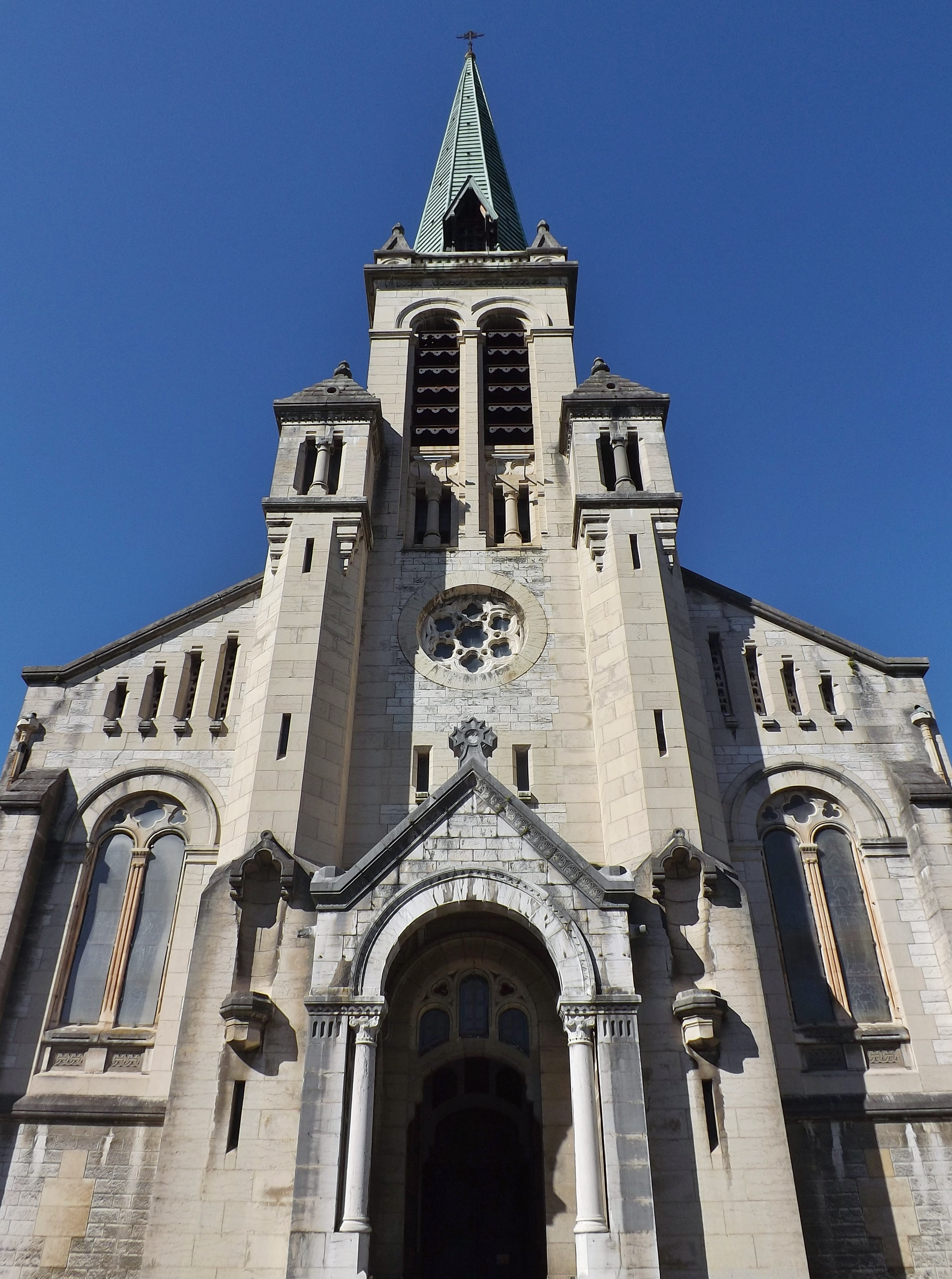
The façade of the church

The Notre-Dame-des-Eaux ('Our Lady of the Waters') Church, parish of the Assumption, is located in the centre of Aix-les-Bains. An architectural competition was held to design the religious building and was won by Arthur Bertin. The construction was entrusted to the Bonna company. Work began in 1890 with completion planned for 1892 while, in reality, changes were still made until 1905.

The building takes the form of a cross. The general appearance is of Byzantine inspiration. The crossing of the transepts supports a dome. The colour of its green steeple is due to the oxidation of its cover which is made of wood. The tower rises 55 metres (180 ft) above the courtyard. One can also admire its simple barrel vaults which, for their part, are of rather Romanesque inspiration. The Way of the Cross, currently ranking in the supplementary inventory of historic monuments, comes from Spain, from where it was brought by General Forestier, during the campaigns of Napoleon. The tables of the Twelve Apostles, classified since 1976, and preserved in the choir, definitely come from Italy, according to expertise, and would be of 17th century origin. The building dominates the heights of the Aix-les-Bains town, and it is very present in the daily life of the inhabitants.

The square in front of the church is used for public parking during the week, due to its central location in the urban fabric.

==== The Faure Museum ====
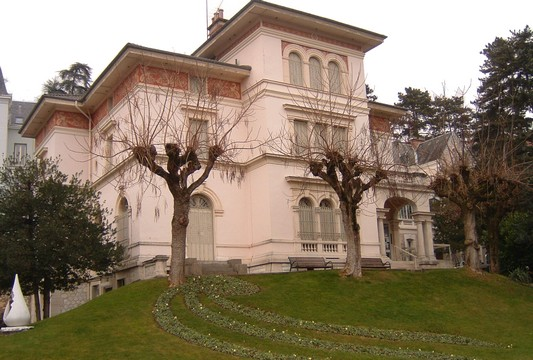
The Faure Museum

The Faure Museum is based on works originally from a private collection, that of Dr. Jean Faure (1862–1942). They were bequeathed to the city and kept, in a villa built in 1902, since 1949. This museum has the second greatest French collection of works of Rodin with not less than thirty-four sculptures, not counting the master studies. The establishment also displays a collection of paintings concerning impressionism to the public. Associated painters, such as those of romanticism, post-impressionism and symbolism are also displayed. It holds the second largest impressionist collection of the province. Paintings by Corot, Boudin, Jongkind, Ravier, Puy, Cézanne, Sisley, Pissarro, Degas, Bonnard, Vuillard, Lebourg, Lebasque, Marquet, Robert Antral, Charles Cottet, Jules Desbois, Edmond Aman-Jean, John Singer Sargent, Victor Vignon, Constant Troyon and Stanislas Lépine. Adolphe Monticelli, Georges Michel, and Jean-Victor Bertin are also displayed.

==== Green areas ====
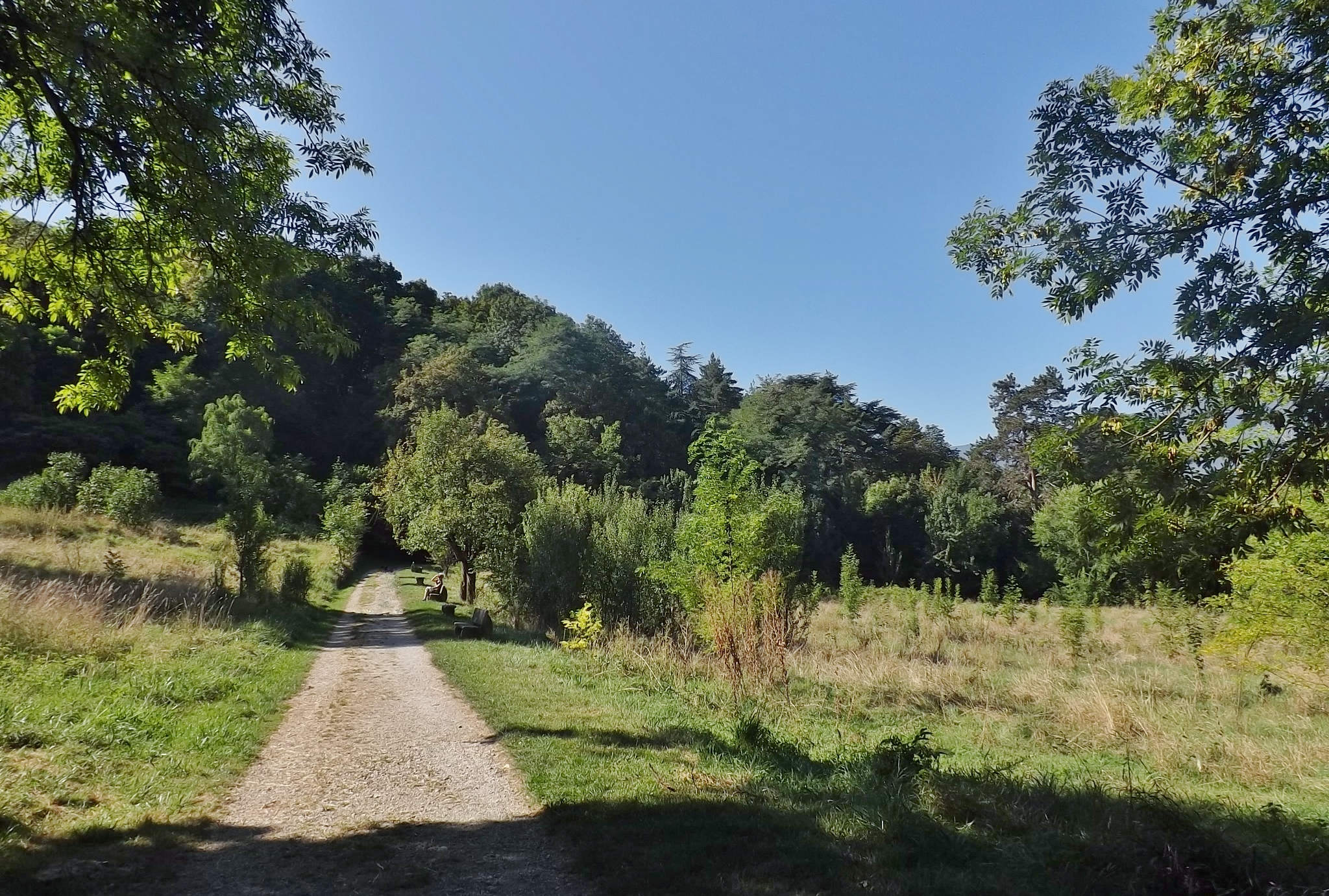
The Parc du Bois Vidal at the heights

Regularly winning awards from the National Committee of the flowering of the France, since 1959, Aix-les-Bains has won several prizes:

- Town of four flowers since 1981
- National grand prize of the flowering confirmed every 3 years since 1989
- National grand prize of the flowers of fall in 1991
- European grand prize of flowering towns and villages, in 1992
- Winner of the Golden Tree awarded by the National Union of Entrepreneurs of the Landscape
- In 2012, the Fleur d'Or [Golden Flower]. It was awarded for one year and can no longer be granted back to the city before a period of six years

Aix-les-Bains has averaged more than:

- 860 bins and planters
- 6,000 trees in the city centre including 2,150 in alignment
- 279 hectares (690 acres) of parks, gardens, squares and sports facilities
- 125,000 plants including 45,000 bulbs in spring
- 72,000 plants in summer
- 3,200 plants in autumn

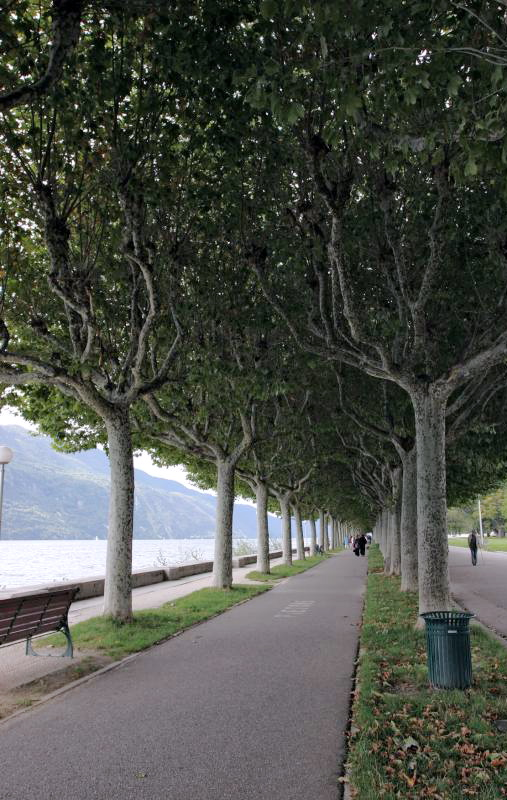
The esplanade alongside the Lac du Bourget

A flowering in four seasons is ensured in the town. Thus, its horticultural centre of approximately 2,500 square metres (27,000 sq ft) ensures continuous and regular production of about 300,000 plants per year. In summer 2008, more than 95,000 plants wrapped and decorated the town, divided into 103 species and separated into 241 varieties. Aix-les-Bains was the first city in Savoy to embark, in 2006, in integrated biological control, a mode of ecological production of plants.

The Parc floral des Thermes is composed of old and rare trees. This is a theatre of greenery with three thousand seats. It welcomes open-air concerts, especially in summer.

The Parc du Bois Vidal, in an area of 18 hectares (44 acres) in the heart of the town, includes woods and meadows in its midst, along with hiking trails and a sports park.

The esplanade of the lake spans the east shore of the Lac du Bourget. Bounded by two marinas, it includes a lawn and trees. The Musilac festival, as well as the Navig'Aix event, occur here each year.

The Corsuet forest stretches along the edge of the town of Aix-les-Bains in an area of approximately 116 hectares (290 acres). Many trails have been constructed. There are also sports courses and the presence of mountain bikers.

The Japanese Garden offers a composition of a design based on Kanji at its centre. It is located on the Avenue Charles de Gaulle, at the entrance of the Golden Tulip Hotel.

==== Hotels ====
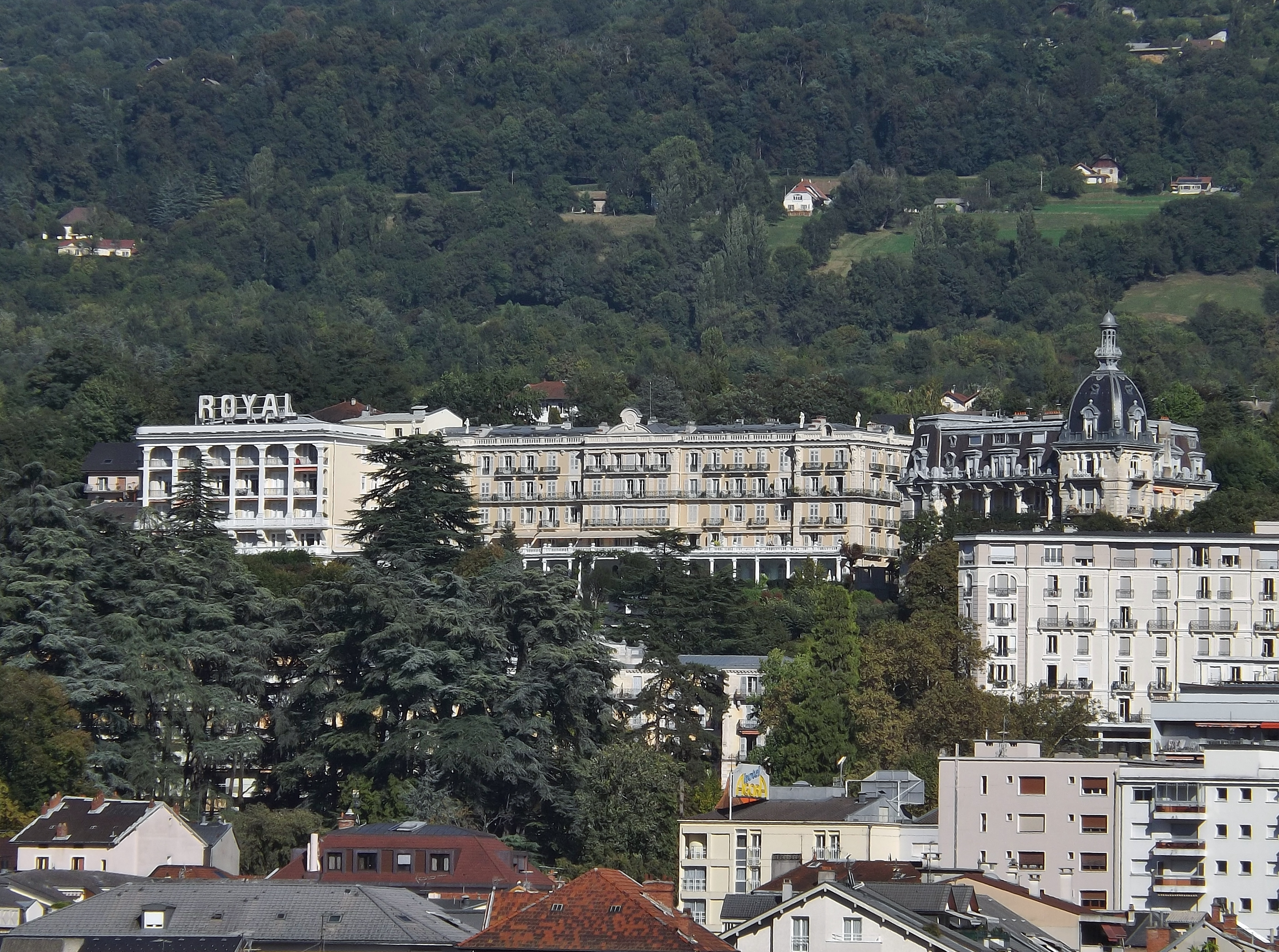
The Royal, Splendide and Excelsior luxury hotels seen from Tresserve

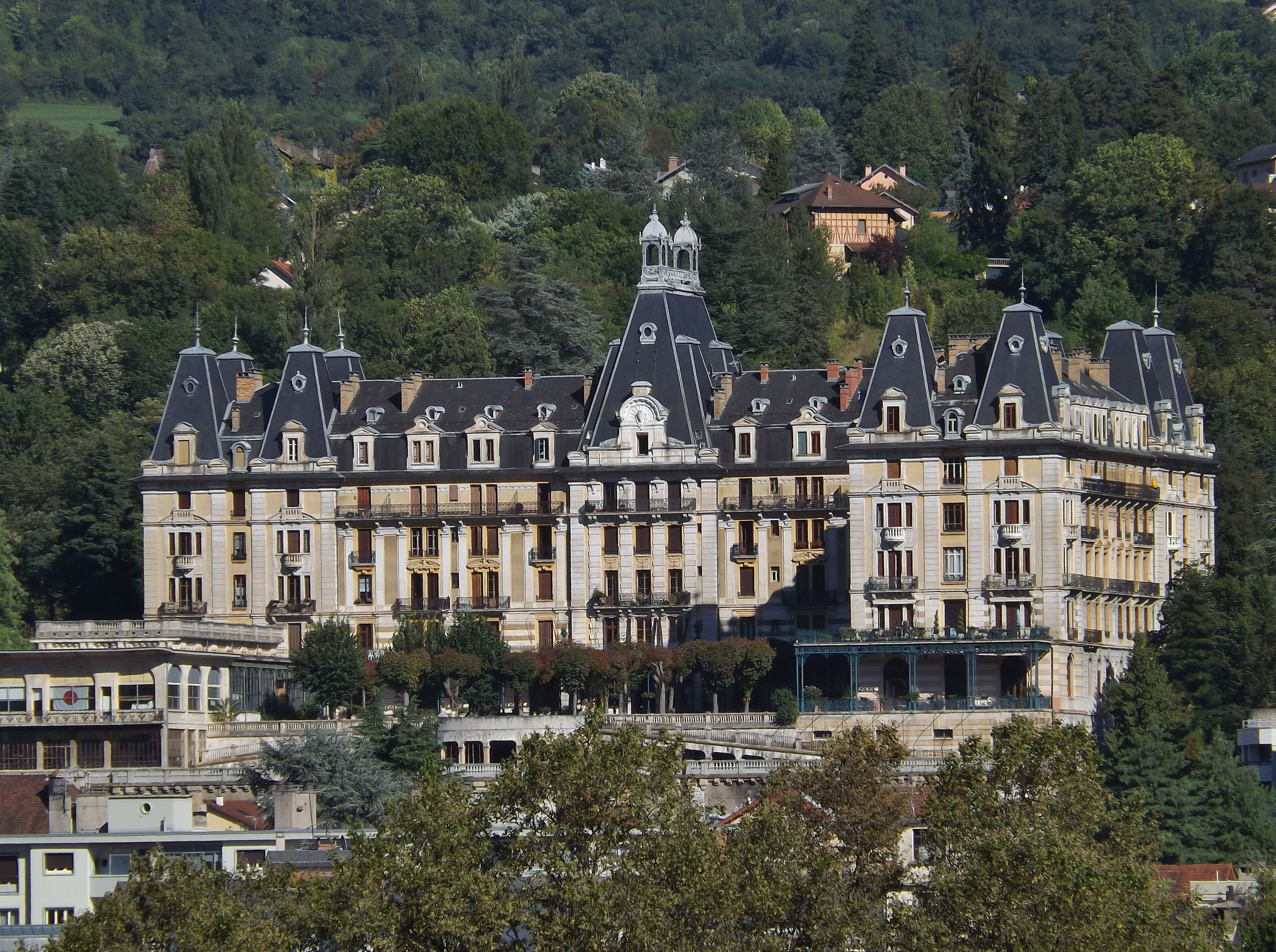
The Bernascon luxury hotel

Among other tall buildings in Aix-les-Bains, the luxury hotels must be listed. Now though, they are vestiges of the Belle Époque, and have been mostly converted into collective housing. However, they maintain their impressive exterior façades as well as their masterful entries, adorned with most of the awnings from the time and with canopies of wrought iron. These palaces are the Beau-site, the Grand Hotel, the Bernascon, the Splendide, the Royal and the Mirabeau, etc. Not to mention the Astoria which is the only grand hotel still in operation.

The great hotel projects multiplied in Aix-les-Bains between 1883 and 1914. The funding emerged from the two prestigious figures of Gaudens-Antoine Rossignoli (1837–1908) and Jean-Marie Bernascon (1826–1912), while the designs illustrate the works of Antoine Gouy and Alfred Olivet, both architects in Geneva, and Sébastien Pin, known also as Jules Pin Sr., an architect of Aix-les-Bains.

- The Splendide luxury hotel (1884) built by Gaudens Antoine Rossignoli
- The Excelsior luxury hotel (1906) built by Gaudens Antoine Rossignoli
- The Bernascon luxury hotel (1909) built by Jean-Marie Bernascon with its annex villa Regina
- The Royal luxury hotel (1914) built by Louis Rossignoli
- The Mirabeau luxury hotel (1910)
- The Grand Hotel (1858) built by C-B Pellegrini with a "Les Ambassadeurs" annex in 1877
- The Hotel of the Globe (1868), today Hôtel de l'Europe with its annex Villa Victoria (1883) to receive the Queen
- The Beau Site Hotel (1883)
- The International Hotel (1893), burned in the years 1985–1995, now renovated
- The Hôtel des Iles Britanniques [Hotel of the British Isles] (1903)
- The Astoria Hotel (1904)
- The Panoramic Hotel

==== Other buildings ====
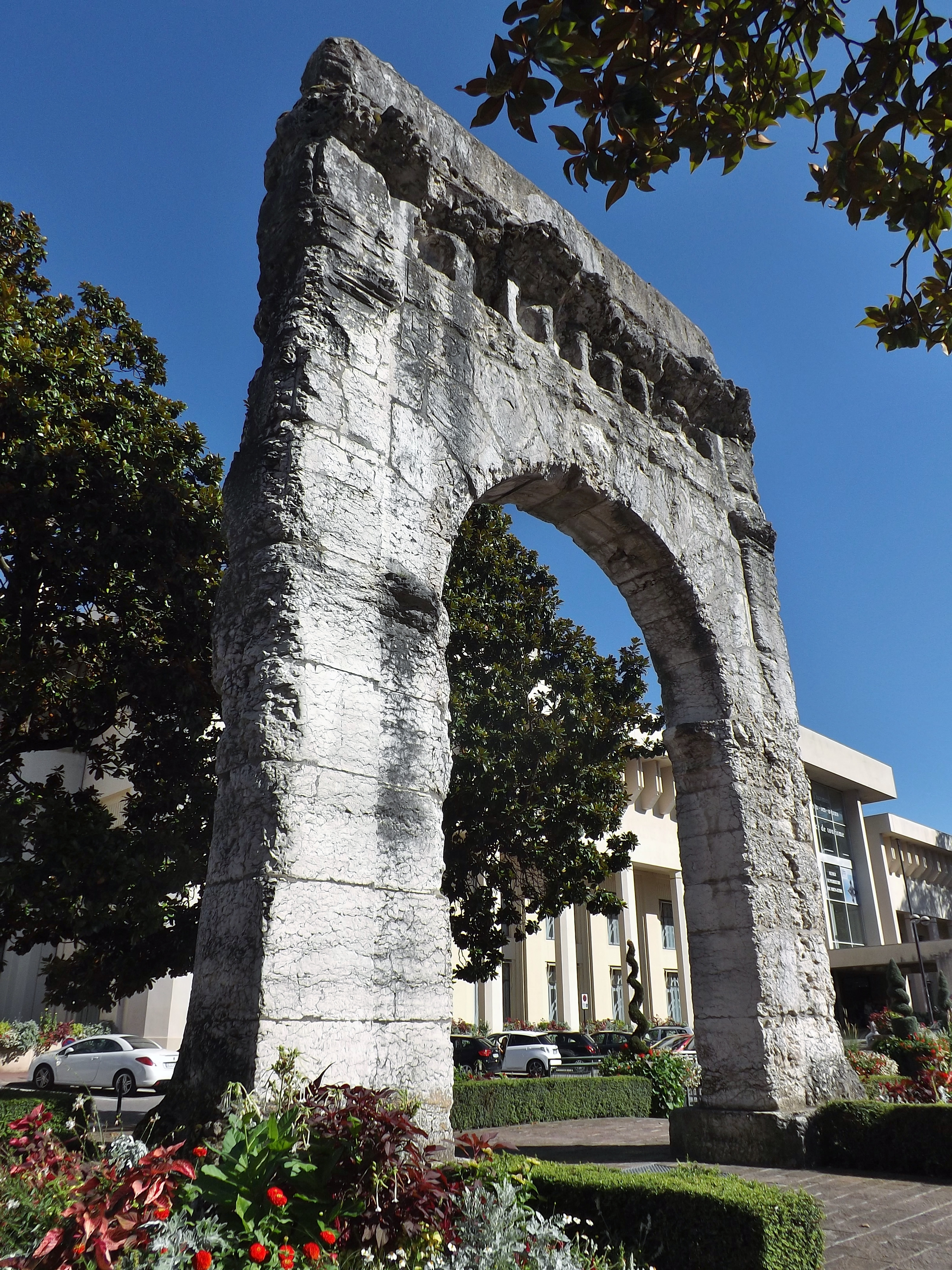
The Arch of Campanus at the National Baths

The town of Aix-les-Bains is dotted with numerous historic buildings as well as buildings of character. Of the Gallo-Roman era, there is the Arc funéraire romain de Campanus [Roman funerary Arch of Campanus]. This arch was erected by the patrician of Gallia Narbonensis, Lucius Pompeius Campanus, honouring the dead of his family. This monument is a symbol representing the passage to the afterlife. The arch has a height of more than 9 metres (30 ft). It consists of an archway between two pillars surmounted by an entablature with architrave, all made of cut stones fitted without mortar. The arch includes a frieze, cornice and an attic. The frieze has eight niches to house the busts of some of the characters to which the arch is dedicated.

There is also the impressive building of the Thermes antiques [ancient baths]. Around 120 BC, the Romans built these comfortable baths in Roman fashion, such as was the case throughout the Empire. The structure includes several baths from a hot bath (caldarium), and a warm bath (tepidarium), to a cold bath (frigidarium). All of the basins are covered in marble. The rooms were decorated with columns and sculptures. Currently, the Roman ruins are still visible inside the national baths.

Also of note is the Hôtel de Ville (town hall). Originally, it was a château of the Marquis of Aix between the 15th and the 17th century. Next to the town hall there is the Gallo-Roman temple, known as the Temple de Diane [Temple of Diana] which became the Lapidary Museum. This ancient shrine is one of three temples in France which are fully preserved. Today converted into the Archaeological Museum, the building houses many statues and antique objects, as well as items from the Bronze Age.

=== Gastronomy ===
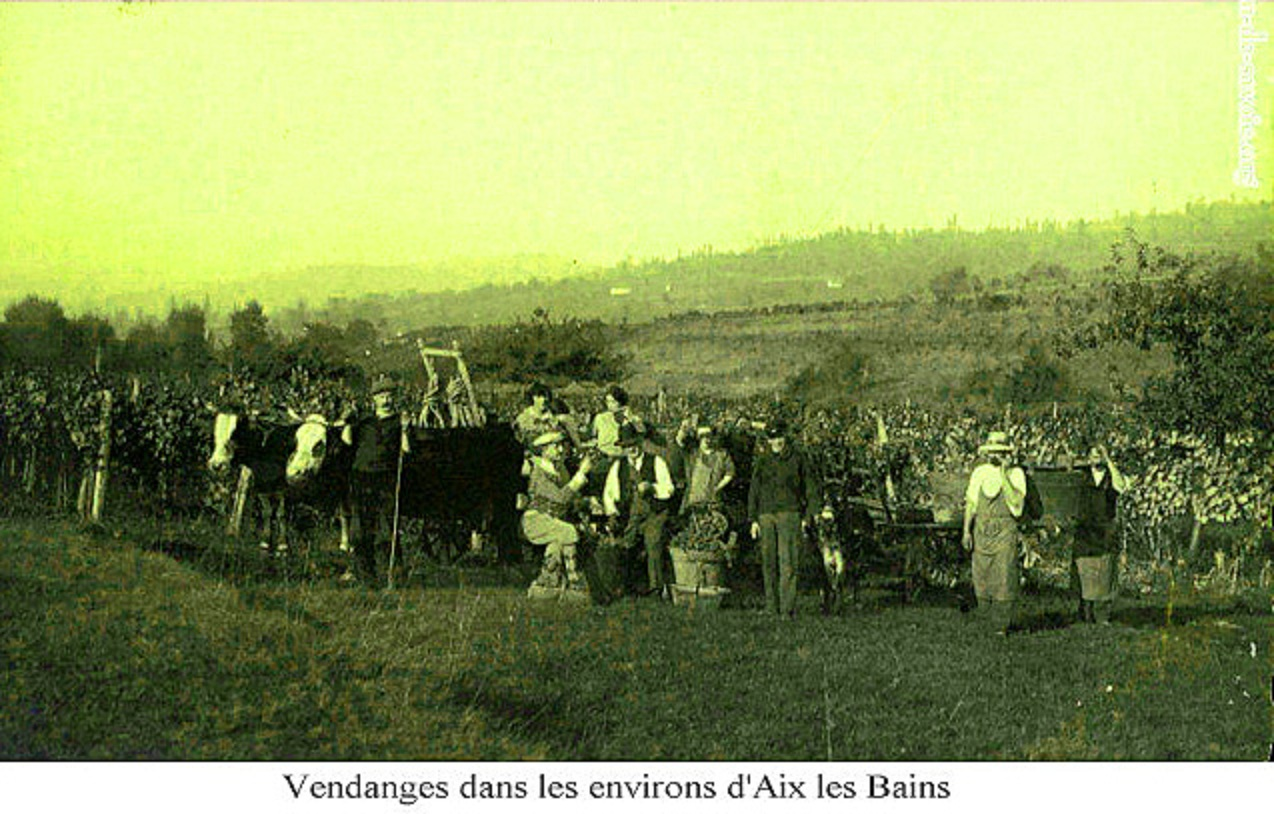
Harvest at Château Boncelin in Chantemerle, near Aix-les- Bains

The cuisine of Aix-les-Bains is typical of Savoy, based on products of the local soil and mountain meadows, essentially the Bauges. In addition to its famous fondue, there is the pleasing main course of potato doughnuts, and also crozets, péla, tartiflette, diots, polenta and rioutes. For dessert, there are bugnes, confiture de lait and blueberry pie. Aix tables feature Savoy cheeses such as Abondance, Beaufort, the Bleu du Mont-Cenis, Savoy Emmental, Savoy Gruyère, Persillé des Aravis, Reblochon, Abbaye de Tamié, Tomme de Savoie and still many others. However, the presence of the Lac du Bourget, and the rivers such as the Tillet and the Sierroz, offer a variety of freshwater fish, to Aix cooks, which make up good number of local dishes. The local trout, Arctic char and the vendace are pleasing to eat. Also fishing and frying pike delights the taste buds of the inhabitants of Aix-les-Bains. The surrounding forests and mountains of average altitude, such as Mont Revard, offer popular produce. There are fungi, for instance, and the reputation of cèpes, boletes of Revard, continues unabated. Several vineyards around the Aix-les-Bains commune produce wines used in many specialities, such as Savoy fondue, by the use of white wine. Thus, the vineyards of Saint-Innocent and of Saint-Baldoph are found near Aix-les-Bains, and the area generally enjoys most of the wines of Savoy.

=== Cultural heritage ===
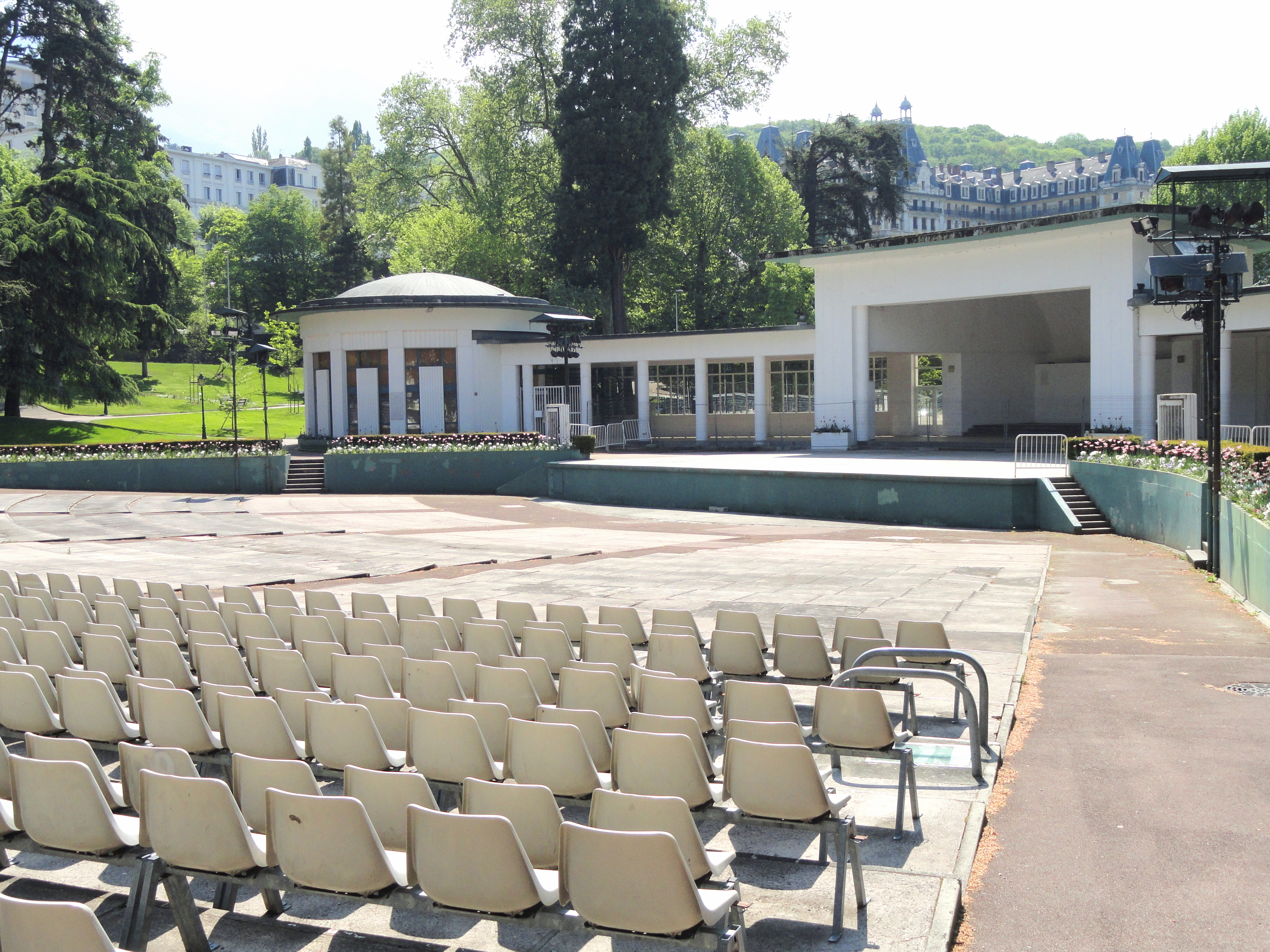
The Theatre de Verdure in the Parc Floral des Thermes

The town of Aix-les-Bains has several facilities to promote culture. The presence of the Casino Grand-Cercle allows the municipality to have a theatre. Commonly known as Théâtre du Casino, it is a masterpiece of the 19th century. It offers a capacity of nine hundred seats and a stage of 20 by 13 metres (66 ft × 43 ft). This Italian theatre has an orchestra pit, an organ and a cinema screen. The casino owner is regularly solicited for the use of this room for film and television shoots, because of its authentic ornamentation. More original still, Aix-les-Bains enjoys an outdoor theatre called the Théâtre de verdure in the city centre, in the park known as the Parc Floral des Thermes. It has a capacity of three thousand seats for outdoor concerts. Tea dances are regularly organized, as well as the Aquascénies event, and also parts of theatres. One of the main halls of the commune is the convention centre of Aix-les-Bains. Exhibitions, congresses, concerts, live comedy, and many other artistic and cultural events are organised here.

Aix-les-Bains was one of the earliest French cities to have had a cinema. Today it has no less than three cinemas which are the Victoria, the Rex, and the Les Toiles du Lac of Aix-les-Bains. These three institutions are all owned by the same owner. With the creation of the multiplex Les Toiles du Lac offering eight rooms, the Rex with its two rooms is slowly disappearing. The Victoria, with its five rooms, should be retained and is still in operation. It is expected to gradually accommodate original films, arts films and trial releases. In addition, the establishment has the second casino of Aix-les-Bains. Smaller than the Casino Grand-Cercle, the Nouveau Casino, which is its commercial name, has an honorable playground of forty-five slot machines, a boule table, thirteen rollers (dice, roulette, etc.), fifteen video-rollers and seventeen video-poker screens.

The Musée Lapidaire is located in a former Gallo-Roman temple of Diana, now converted into an archaeological museum. The building contains many statues and antique objects, including items from the Bronze Age. You can see the remnants of settlements from the Lac du Bourget. Another place of heritage and cultural influence, the Lamartine Municipal Library has a large document fonds. The name is a tribute to the poet and writer Alphonse de Lamartine. The premises should soon be changed, closer to the national baths and Roman baths.

Several learned societies of Savoy are present in the town of Aix-les-Bains. These associations allow enlightened amateurs and specialists to meet around various themes, particularly, regional history or the study of the regional cultural heritage. Present, particularly in the town, are the Société du Patrimoine de Savoie [Society of the Heritage of Savoie] (SPS) founded in Aix-les-Bains in 1995, the Société d'Art et d'Histoire d'Aix-les-Bains et sa Région [Society of Art and history of Aix-les-Bains and its Region], founded in 1993, and the Lakeside Archaeology Centre of Aix-en-Savoie, founded in 1975.

=== Notable people ===
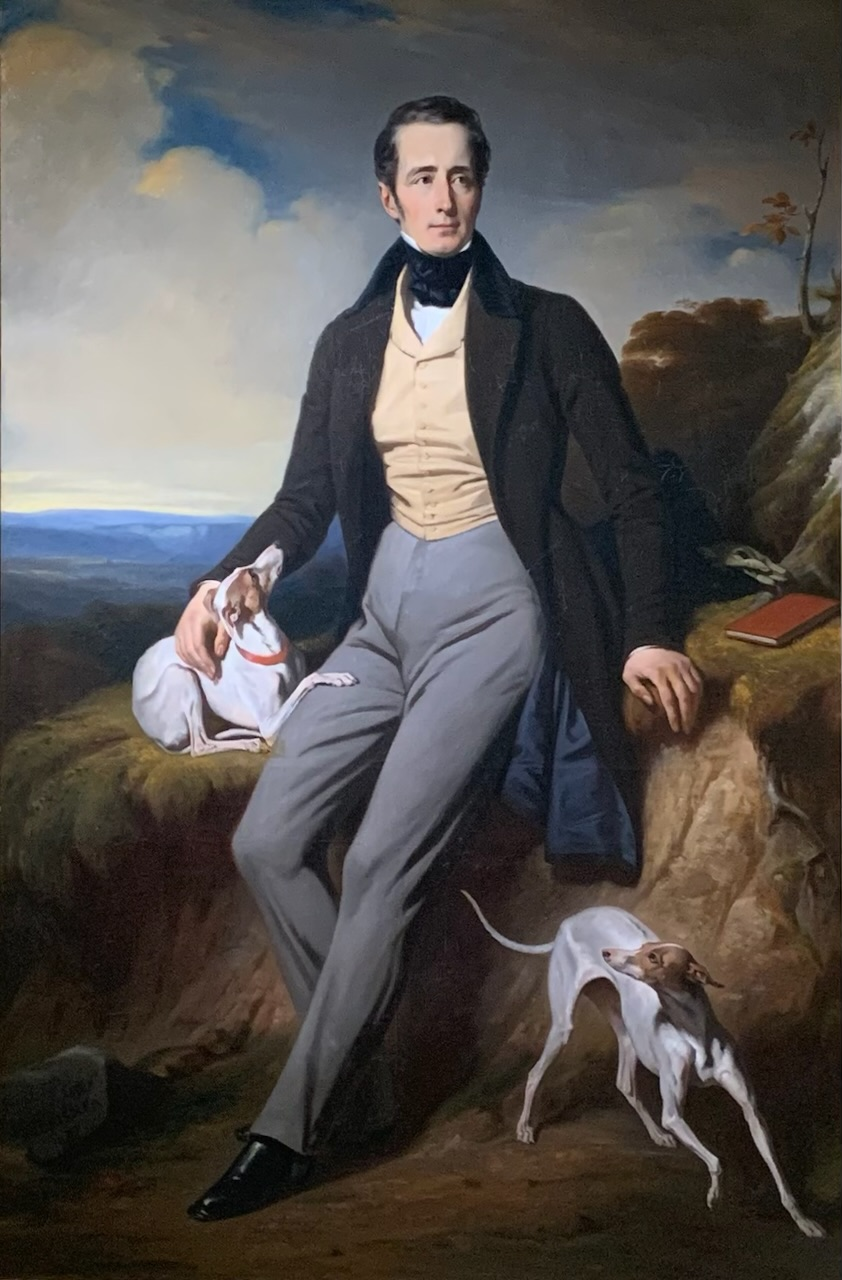
Alphonse de Lamartine

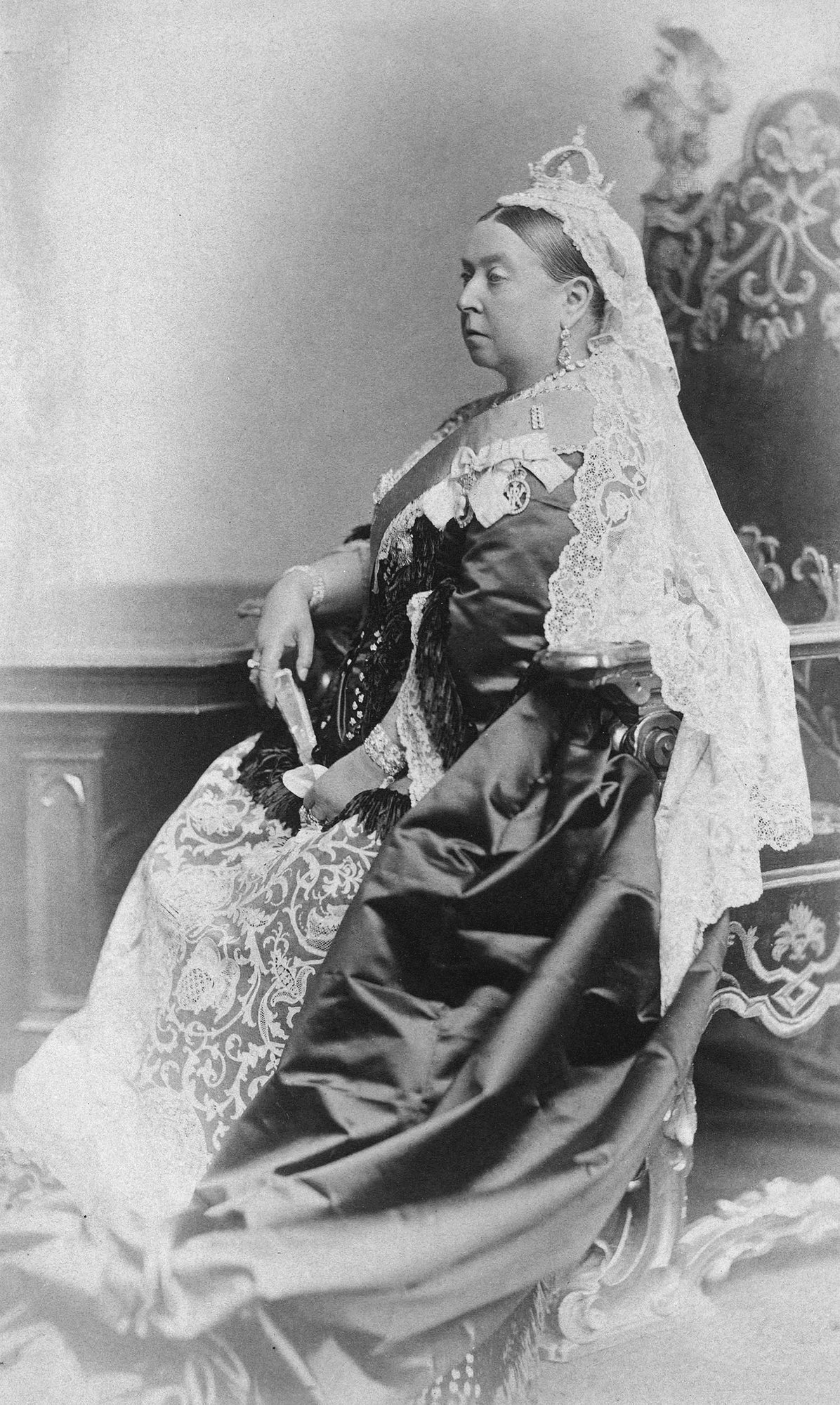
Queen Victoria

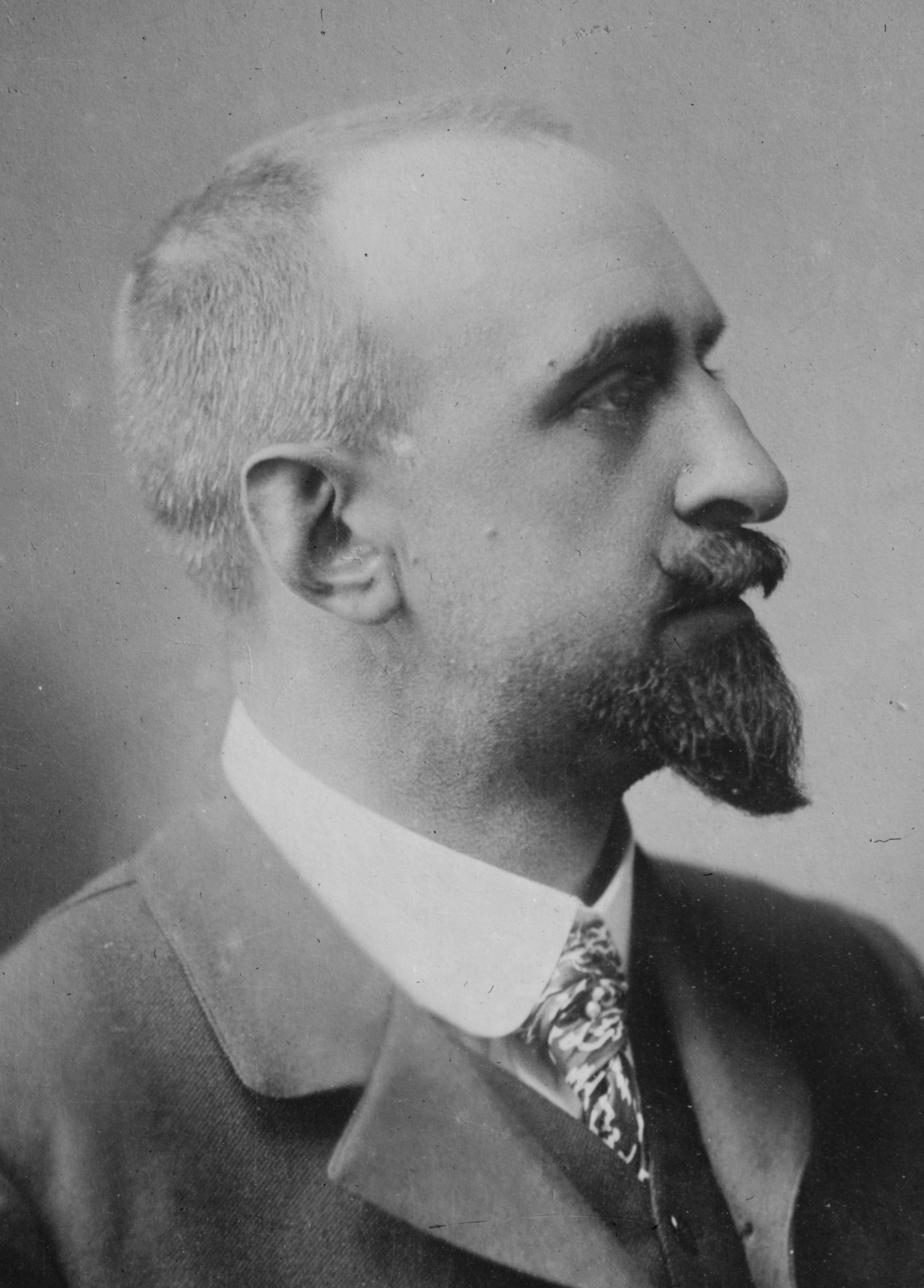
Jean-Baptiste Charcot

Several artists and personalities were born or lived in Aix-les-Bains:

- Victor Amadeus III of Sardinia (1726–1796) – built the baths of Aix in 1783.
- Victor Emmanuel I of Sardinia (1759–1824) – came in 1816 with his wife Maria Theresa of Austria-Este.
- Gaspard François Forestier (1767–1832) – French military, he was a general under the French Revolution and the first Empire. He was made Commander of the Legion of honour.
- François Louis Forestier (1776–1814) – died from wounds sustained in the Battle of Brienne, general in the armies of the Republic and the Empire.
- Alphonse de Lamartine (1790–1869) – he stayed at Aix from 1816 where he met Julie Charles with whom he walked in boat on the Lac du Bourget and where he wrote his poem Le Lac. (a free reconstruction of his room in Aix is in the Faure Museum).
- Urbano Rattazzi (1808–1873) – Prime Minister of Victor Emmanuel II in 1862 and in 1867.
- Major-General Vincent Eyre died here in 1881.
- Emperor Pedro II of Brazil (1825–1891)– came to Aix in 1888.
- Marie de Solms (1831–1902) – woman of letters, poet, Member of the Bonaparte family, lived from 1853 to 1863 in the chalet of Solms in avenue that bears her name.
- Charles Costa de Beauregard (1835–1909) – French politician and historian
- The King George I of Greece (1845–1913) – a regular visitor from 1889 to 1912 appointed honorary citizen of the city, a street bears his name.
- Alfred Boucher (1850–1934) – sculptor moved to Aix in 1889 and died there in 1934. He is the Monument to the dead of the city located in the square bearing his name.
- Jean-Claude Nicolas Forestier (1861–1830) – landscape architect.
- Jean-Baptiste Charcot (1867–1936) – doctor and French Explorer, died at sea, had purchased in Aix in 1896 a Swiss style entirely covered with scales of wood chalet. An Aix Street bears his name.
- Léon Brunschvicg (1869–1944) – French philosopher, his thought is attached to French idealism, he strongly marked and influenced academic thinking of his time.
- Jean de Sperati (1884–1957) – he was one of the greatest forgers of his time. He was considered one of the masters in the realization of fake stamps collection.
- Aimé Bachelard (1885–1975) – French magistrate.
- Charles Luguet (5 June 1896) – FAFL General born in Aix
- Daniel-Rops (1901–1965) – French writer. Born in Épinal, he lived near Aix and there died in 1965.
- Ernestas Galvanauskas (1882–1967) – Lithuanian engineer and diplomat went into exile and died here.
- Bishop Gabriel-Marie Garrone (1901–1994) – Bishop of Chambéry, then titular Archbishop of Turres in Numidia and cardinal by Pope Paul VI.
- Johannès Pallière (1920–) – Savoyard historian and founder of the Athlétique sport aixois.
- Georges Brun (1922–1995) – Rugby Union player.
- Christiane Legrand (1930–2011) – French singer, daughter of conductor Raymond Legrand and sister of composer Michel Legrand.
- Robert Bogey (1935–) – middle-distance runner, he was four times Champion of France on track on 5,000 and 10,000 metres and then once France's Cross-country Champion.
- Jean Mailland (1937–) – writer, lyricist, actor and Director for film and television. He is also Director for the theatre and screenwriter.
- Matthieu Ricard (1946–) – Buddhist monk, son of the philosopher and journalist Jean-François Revel.
- Gilles Bernheim (1952–) – Chief Rabbi of France.
- Alain Lorieux – Rugby Union International who was also manager of the campsite.
- Di Credico (1957–) – figurative painter practice Happening, it runs throughout the world, paintings of very large dimensions, in real-time, to an audience.
- Alain Soral (1958–) – journalist, essayist and French political activist, brother of actress Agnès Soral.
- Agnès Soral (1960–) – French actress who played alongside Coluche in the film Tchao Pantin, by Claude Berri, in 1983. She is also the sister of the journalist and essayist Alain Soral.
- Karl Zéro (1961–) – French television host who has worked in television, radio and print media. Author and satirical political filmmaker.
- Thierry Tulasne (1963–) – Player of tennis in the 1980s. 1980 junior world champion. He is now the coach of Gilles Simon.
- Laurence Ferrari (1966–) – French journalist, presenter of the television programme 20h on TF1, after working in television (Canal+, France 2), radio (Europe 1) and in the print media. Daughter of the former Mayor of Aix Gratien Ferrari.
- Philippe Cerboneschi (1967–) –better known under the pseudonym of Philippe Zdar, it is part of the musical duo Cassius, he is also producer of music (Phoenix, Housse de Racket, Beastie Boys, The Rapture, Cat Power, -M-, MC Solaar) – he won a Grammy Award in 2010 with Phoenix for the album Wolfgang Amadeus Phoenix.
- Hervé Renard (1968–) – retired professional French footballer currently head coach of the Saudi Arabia national football team.
- Jean Sulpice (1978–) – French chef
- Christophe Lemaitre (1990–) – French athlete trains at Aix, become 2010 European champion of the 100, 200 and relay 4 × 100 meters.

Many personalities have frequented Aix-les-Bains, including for spa treatment. Among the most famous is Queen Victoria who came in 1885, 1887 and 1890 with her daughter, Princess Béatrice, the Empress Sisi (1895), the Queen-Mother of Portugal Maria Pia of Savoy, the King Leopold II of Belgium, Albert I, Prince of Monaco, many Pashas of Saudi Arabia, King Faisal of Jordan, Aga Khan III (who married in Aix), Queens Emma and Wilhelmina of the Netherlands and the American financier J. P. Morgan. The film The Day the Titanic sank by director Pierre-Yves Bezat, starring Patrick Chesnais as J. P. Morgan, and entirely shot in Aix-les-Bains, focuses on the stay of the financier in the town during the sinking of the Titanic.

The family of Napoleon Bonaparte stayed at the Villa Chevaley, on the heights of Aix: Maria Letizia Ramolino, Pauline Bonaparte (in 1808 and 1812), Joséphine de Beauharnais (1810) and then Marie-Louise of Austria (in 1812 and 1814), Hortense de Beauharnais (came regularly with her son from 1811 to 1815 founded in a hospital in 1813 in memory of her friend Adèle de Broc) drowned in the gorges of the Sierroz), Napoleon III and Eugénie.

Also included are Madame de Staël (visited in 1810), Madame Récamier, Madame de Boigne, Benjamin Constant, Talma, Eugène Sue, François Ponsard, Victor Hugo (came to visit his friend Marie de Solms), Alexandre Dumas with his friend Honoré de Balzac, George Sand, Guy de Maupassant, Paul Verlaine who was arrested the day of his arrival by police Commissioner Jullien, Jean Richepin, Félix Faure, Sadi Carnot, Yves Guyot, Jules Roche, Pierre Puvis de Chavannes, Sarah Bernhardt, Camille Saint-Saëns, Sergei Rachmaninoff, Jean Moulin, Bergson, Edwige Feuillère, Paul Claudel, Yvonne Printemps, Pierre Fresnay, Mistinguett, Charles Trenet, Yves Montand, Line Renaud, Luis Mariano, Maurice Chevalier, Georges Brassens, Édith Piaf and Charles Aznavour. Not to mention, there are many other contemporary personalities.

=== Heraldry ===
Arms of Aix-les-Bains	The arms of Aix-les-Bains are blazoned: Gules to a star of gold at the chief point. Very little is known about this coat of arms. Amadeus IV, Count of Savoy, had for arms: gules to a star of sixteen silver rays. The proximity of the two coats of arms can constitute an early response in the study of the arms of the town considered, then, in the Middle Ages as a human community. We know, however, that these arms were drawn at the end of the 19th century by the designer Guido Gonin. The town never had charters of franchises before the Revolution, lacking its own coat of arms. On the other hand, the arms of the Seyssel family are present in the Château of Aix.

== See also ==
- Communes of the Savoie department
- List of spa towns in France

== Bibliography ==
- Lagrange, Joël (2007). Aix-les-Bains - l'Entre-deux-guerres [Aix-les-Bains - the Interwar period] (in French). Saint-Cyr-sur-Loire. ISBN 9782849107133.
- Collective (2006). La nouvelle rando: Savoie, Aix-les-Bains, autour du lac du Bourget [The new touring: Savoie, Aix-les-Bains, around Lake Bourget] (in French). Saint-Laurent-de-Neste, Hautes-Pyrénées. ISBN 9782915069174.
- Giraud, Geneviève (2005). Les thermes nationaux d'Aix-les-Bains : le fil de l'eau [National Baths of Aix-les-Bains : the water wire] (in French). Barberaz (140 Galerie de la Chartreuse, 73000). ISBN 9782952397506.
- Frieh-Giraud, Geneviève (2005). Aix-les-Bains : Ville d'eaux de la Belle Époque [Aix-les-Bains: Spa Town of the Belle Époque] (in French). Dauphiné Libéré. ISBN 978-2-911739-86-6.
- Connille, Jean-François (2003). Aix-les-Bains : Héritages et ouvertures [Aix-les-Bains: Inheritance and openings] (in French). Questio. ISBN 978-2-913732-15-5.
- Collective (2003). Chambéry, Aix-les-Bains, lac du Bourget. Comp'Act. ISBN 978-0-7549-3389-2.
- Barbier, V. (2001). Aix-les-Bains et ses environs [Aix-les-Bains and its environs] (in French). Bastion. ISBN 978-2-7455-0131-8.
- Jeudy, Jean-Marie (1998). Les sentiers autour de Chambéry-Aix : histoires et itinéraires [The trails around Chambéry-Aix: stories and routes] (in French). Claix. ISBN 9782703802389.
- Jeudy, Jean-Marie (1998). Chambéry et Aix-les-Bains autrefois [Chambéry and Aix-les-Bains past] (in French). Horvath. ISBN 978-2-7171-0920-7.
- Collet, Paul (1997). Notre cher Aix-les-Bains : poèmes [Our dear Aix-les-Bains: poems] (in French). Paris. ISBN 9782840143918.
- Lecoq, Geneviève (1993). 52 balades en famille autour de Chambéry, Aix-les-Bains [52 family walks around Chambéry, Aix-les-Bains] (in French). Grenoble. ISBN 9782703801115.
- Henry, Planche (1972). Aix-les-Bains (in French). Saep. ASIN B0000DMCJP.
- Pérouse, Gabriel (1967). La vie d'autrefois à Aix-les-Bains : la ville, les thermes, les baigneurs [The old life in Aix-les-Bains: The city, the baths, the bathers] (in French). Dardel. ASIN B0000DRAKF.
- Recherches sur l'action de la cure d'Aix-les-Bains [Research on the action of the cure of Aix-les-Bains] (in French). Pacomhy. 1954. ASIN B0000DL4VX.
- Les guides bleus illustrés : Aix-les-Bains, Chambéry [Blue illustrated guides: Aix-les-Bains, Chambéry] (in French). Hachette. 1934. ASIN B0000DRNTW.
