= Artists of Dionysus =

Association of actors

The Artists of Dionysus or Dionysiac Artists (Ancient Greek: οἱ περὶ τὸν Διόνυσον τεχνιταί, romanized: hoi peri ton Dionuson technitai) were an association of actors and other performers who coordinated the organisation of Greek theatrical and musical performances in the Hellenistic Period and under the Roman Empire. They are first attested in the 270s BC, when a number of regional associations are attested. They acted as independent political actors, engaging in collective bargaining with cities, kings, and the Roman Republic, in order to secure a wide range of privileges. They also quarreled with one another and with individual communities. In the late first century BC, following the establishment of the Roman empire, these regional associations mostly faded away.

Under the Julio-Claudian emperors, a single "universal" or "ecumenical" association of artists was established, which called itself the sacred thymelic synod of ecumenical artists of Dionysus, sacred victors, crown-wearers, and their fellow competitors (Ancient Greek: ἡ ἱερὰ θυμελικὴ σύνοδος τῶν ἀπὸ τῆς οἰκουμένης περὶ τὸν Διόνυσον τεχνειτῶν ἱερονεικῶν στεφανειτῶν καὶ τῶν τούτων συναγωνιστῶν), alongside a similar organisation for athletes. It is unclear whether the impetus for this came from the Roman emperors or the artists themselves. These artists flourished in the second and third centuries AD, when they had a headquarters in Rome and performed in festivals from southern Gaul to Egypt and Syria. They disappear from the record around 300 AD and had certainly died out by the 420s AD.

== Background ==
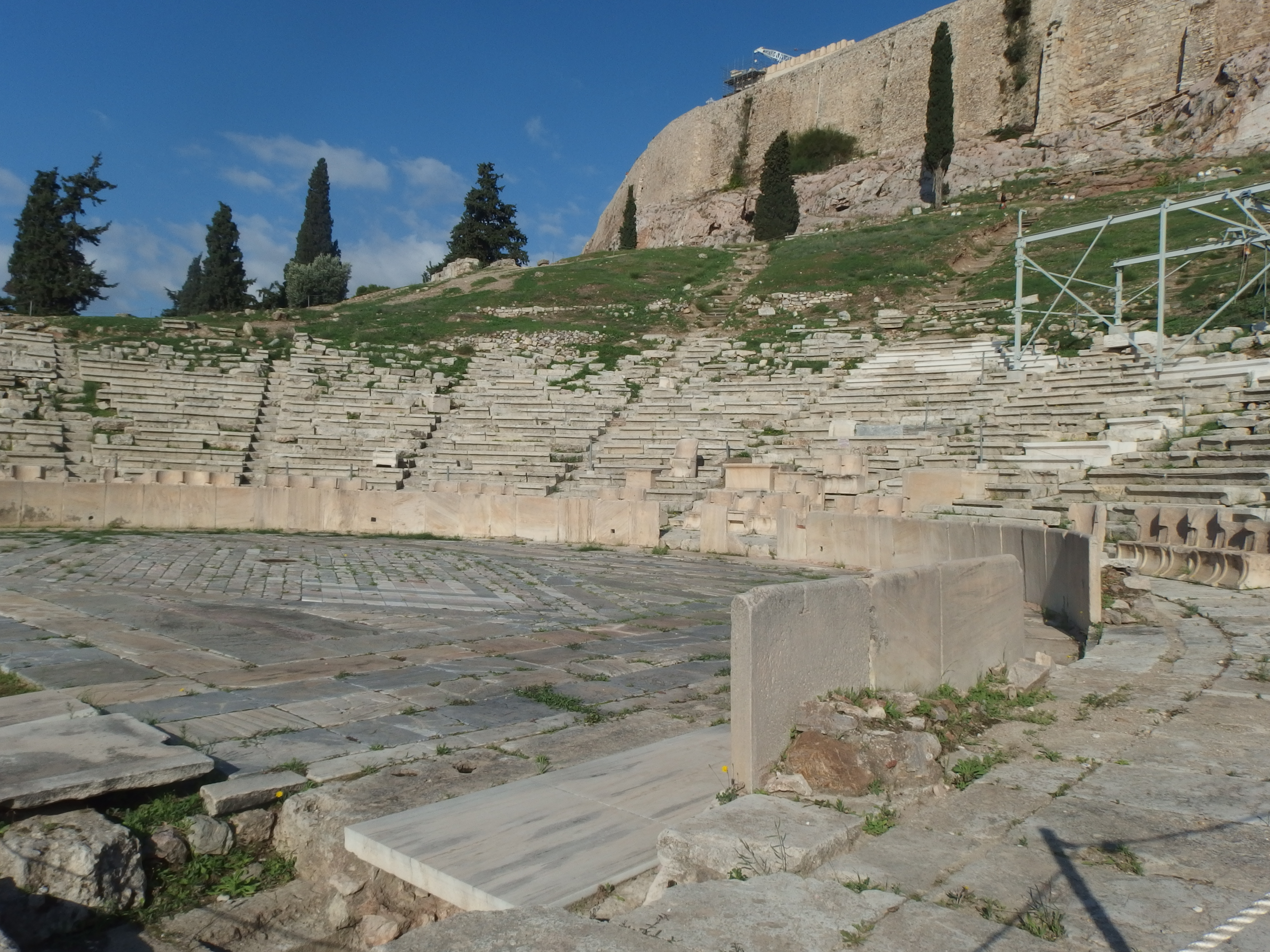
Theatre of Dionysus, Athens.

Ancient Greek theatre developed during the Classical Period, especially in the city of Athens, where competitive performances of tragedy and comedy took place in the Theatre of Dionysus at the Dionysia and Lenaia festivals. Initially, the performers were amateurs, drawn from the citizen body. Already in the fifth century BC, however, plays began to be performed abroad and actors (as opposed to chorus members) became increasingly professionalised. In the fourth century BC, these processes accelerated. Performances of "old tragedies" and "old comedies", as opposed to newly composed works, which are first attested in Athens in 386 BC, became an important part of the theatre scene. Theatrical and musical performances became part of the competition at many Panhellenic games festivals, notably the Pythian and Isthmian games, and mobile theatrical troupes would travel the circuit, performing at these festivals. After Alexander the Great's conquest of Egypt and the Near East, new Panhellenic festivals were established in the conquered territories, as well as in Greece and Asia Minor.

Another institution which developed in the fifth century BC and grew increasingly common over the fourth century was the association or club, a collective group, usually centred around worship of a deity and shared meals. These associations usually had officers and common meetings, modelled on the magistrates and assemblies of Greek cities. The members of these associations might share a common place of origin and/or a common activity (e.g. merchants, organising festivals for their patron deity). There were several terms for these associations, including koinon ("shared thing") and synodos ("synod" or "meeting").

== Hellenistic Period ==
The first attestations of the Dionysiac artists come in the 270s BC. The Dionysiac artists of Athens are mentioned in an inscribed decree passed by the Amphictyony of Delphi between 279 and 277 BC, which confirmed that they enjoyed "inviolability" (asylia), rights to safe travel, freedom from military obligations, and tax exemptions. The Egyptian artists are mentioned in Callixenus of Rhodes' description of the Grand Procession organised by Ptolemy II at one of the Ptolemaia festivals of the 270s BC. Both testimonies seem to refer to associations that already existed. Several associations are attested:

Name	Greek name	Area of operation	Notes
Association of the Artists of Dionysus in Athens	ἡ σύνοδος / τὸ κοινὸν τῶν περὶ τὸν Διόνυσον τεχνιτῶν τῶν ἐν Ἀθήναις	Athens, Delphi	The headquarters were in Athens.
Association of the Artists of Dionysus who travel/celebrate together at Isthmia and Nemea	τὸ κοινὸν τῶν περὶ τὸν Διόνυσον τεχνιτῶν τῶν εἰς Ἰσθμὸν καὶ Νεμέαν συμορευομένων / συντελούντων	Peloponnese, Boeotia, Delphi, Euboea, Macedon	There were headquarters in Argos, Thebes, and elsewhere.
Association of the Artists of Dionysus in Ionia and the Hellespont	τὸ κοινὸν τῶν περὶ τὸν Διόνυσον τεχνιτῶν τῶν ἐπ' Ἰωνίας καὶ Ἑλλησπόντου	Ionia, Hellespont, Boeotia, and Delphi	The headquarters was located in Teos. It merged with the following in the second century BC.
Association of the Artists of the Guide Dionysus	τὸ κοινὸν τῶν περὶ τὸν Καθηγεμόνα Διόνυσον τεχνιτῶν	Pergamon, Attalid kingdom	Merged with the preceding in the second century BC.
The Artists of Dionysus and the Sibling Gods	οἱ περὶ τὸν Διόνυσον καὶ θεοὺς Ἀδελφοὺς	Ptolemaic Egypt, Peloponnese, Delphi	The "sibling gods" were Ptolemy II and Arsinoe II
Association of the Artists of Dionysus in the secretariat for Cyprus	τὸ κοινὸν τῶν ἐν τῶι κατὰ Κύπρον γραμματείωι περὶ τὸν Διόνυσον τεχνιτῶν	Cyprus	A subordinate branch of the preceding, under Ptolemaic control.
Association of the Artists of Dionysus	τὸ κοινὸν τῶν περὶ τὸν Διόνυσον τεχνιτῶν	Syracuse	This organisation seems to have co-existed with the following in Syracuse.
Association of the Artists of Cheerful Aphrodite	ἡ σύνοδος τῶν περὶ τὴν ἱλαρὰν Ἀφροδίτην τεχνιτῶν	Syracuse	This organisation seems to have co-existed with the preceding in Syracuse. It may have specialised in the performance of phlyax plays, while the artists of Dionysus focussed on tragedy and comedy.
Artists of Dionysus?	?	Rhodes	Very poorly known

These associations differed from one another in internal structure and general situation. The Athenian association was dependent on the city of Athens and supported Athenian foreign policy goals. The Egyptian association was similarly tied to the Ptolemaic royal court. By contrast, the Isthmian and Nemean association was a "loose confederation," with bases in many cities but not dominated by any of them. The Ionian and Hellespontine association, which was based in the city of Teos, became so powerful that it clashed with the civic authorities.

Most theatrical performers were not members of the association. The artists were an elite group, who enjoyed special prestige. The different branches of the artists were not unified, as is best known from a long-running conflict between the artists of Athens and the artists of Isthmia and Nemea, mentioned in numerous inscriptions and eventually subject of an arbitration by the Roman Republic.

The development of the artists of Dionysus in the early Hellenistic period contrasts with competitors in athletic competitions at festivals, who did not develop an association until the early Imperial period, and competitors in equestrian events, who never developed an association. Remijsen suggests that theatrical performers formed an association early because of their greater level of professionalisation. Bram Fauconnier emphasises the fact that theatrical performers had to collaborate on a performance as part of a team, unlike athletes who always competed as individuals.

=== Festival activities ===
The artists were able to organise theatrical performances, providing the main actors, supporting actors, technical crew, props, and costumes. Kings, cities, and sanctuaries would contract them to provide these services for a given festival. This included major Panhellenic events, like the Pythian Games, at which multiple branches of the artists might perform, and smaller local events. However, membership of the artists was a prestigious status, enjoyed by only a minority of attested performers in the period. Festivals could always employ the leaders of independent theatrical troupes (ergolaboi). However, these troupes were less prestigious and festival organisers thus preferred to employ the artists of Dionysus if they could afford it.

Various procedures for contracting the artists are attested. A decree from Iasos, records that the city sent an embassy to the artists, who held an assembly at which they selected a group of performers, who then negotiated a contract with Iasian embassy. In other cases, the festival organisers may have requested specific performers.

Theatrical performances at festivals had religious significance and the artists emphasised their devotion to Dionysus and the other gods above all else. In one decree from Delphi, they call themselves "the most pious of the Greeks." In a decree of the Amphictyony, they are granted various privileges and freedoms, "so that the honours and sacrifices for which [they] are appointed can be carried out for the gods at the appropriate times, as they are free from all other activities and devoted to the services for the gods."

=== Organisation ===
Like other Hellenistic associations, the artists' internal organisation were modelled on contemporary Hellenistic city-states. They had laws (nomoi) and passed decrees (psephismata). Administration was carried out by priests managers (epimeletai), treasurers (tamiai), magistrates (archontes), and secretaries (grammateis). Decisions were made at assemblies (synodoi) of all members of the association. On one occasion in the second century BC, the Ionian-Hellespontine association minted its own coinage.

Each association of artists had one or more headquarters, which took the form of a "sanctuary" (temenos) dedicated to Dionysus. Their chief officials served as priests of Dionysus. Their meetings included a range of sacrifices and they hosted their own festivals and religious events in honour of Dionysus.

=== Diplomacy ===
The associations of artists were independent political entities. They sent their own envoys to cities, kings, and other states and received embassies from them in turn. They appointed citizens of other communities as their official representatives (proxenos). These interactions often focussed on securing safe passage and tax immunities for their members. In addition, they sent their own sacred ambassadors (theoroi), as their official representatives, to major festivals. They appointed sacred hosts (theorodokoi) to receive foreign sacred ambassadors at their festivals. All of these actions were typical for city-states in the Hellenistic period, but not of most other associations.

Communities seeking to secure the prestigious status of "crown games" for a new or existing festival, might make overtures to the artists, asking them to recognise that status. They also helped secure recognition from other cities and competitors. However, the diplomatic role of the artists went far beyond theatrical matters. In the second century BC, for example the Ionian-Hellespontine artists undertook a diplomatic mission to Crete, for example.

==== Hellenistic kings ====
The artists often maintained particularly close links with the Hellenistic kings, who often connected themselves closely with the god Dionysus and presented themselves in theatrical fashion. The Egyptian artists seem to have been founded and controlled by the Ptolemaic dynasty. It played a central role in Dionysiac procession at the dynasty's Ptolemaia festival in Alexandria and its official title included the "sibling gods", King Ptolemy II and Queen Arsinoe II, alongside Dionysus. The Ionian and Hellespontine artists maintained a ruler cult for the Attalid dynasty: the organiser of their Dionysia festival was ex officio priest of the Attalid kings. Paola Ceccarelli proposes that the Athenian branch was founded by King Demetrius Poliorcetes, who was venerated at Athens as the "New Dionysus" after 306 BC. They awarded divine honours to Ariarathes V of Cappadocia in the 130s BC and acclaimed Mithridates VI as the "new Dionysus" in 88 BC, in both cases acting in support of Athenian foreign policy goals. Jane Lightfoot argued that the artists helped "to inscribe royal power into the cycle of city life." By contrast, Bram Fauconnier presents them as conciliating royal power where it was strong, but operating independently of it elsewhere.

==== Inter-association conflicts ====
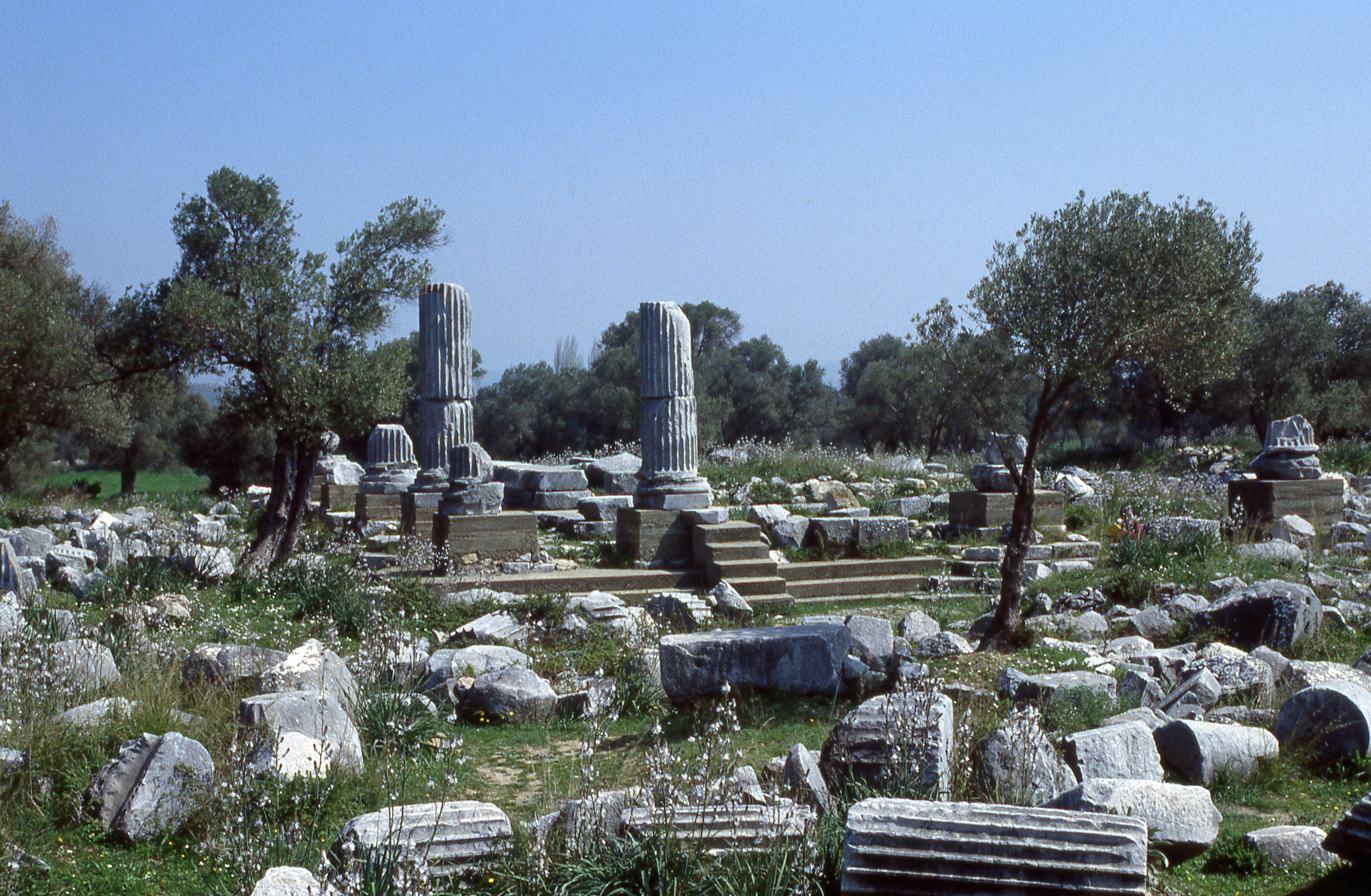
Temple of Dionysus in Teos, built in the second century BC.

In the second century BC, the Ionian and Hellespontine artists took to organising a Dionysia festival with theatrical performances in their home base of Teos. They insisted on collecting and keeping the tax revenues arising from the festival and the Teans objected, eventually appealing to the Attalid king, who ruled in their favour. Subsequently, they were expelled from Teos and fled to Ephesus. Attalus II resettled them at Myonessus, but the Teans appealed this decision to Rome, so they were transferred to Lebedus.

In the 130s BC, the Athenian association and the Isthmian-Nemean association came into conflict because their areas of operation overlapped so closely. The associations attempted to collaborate in Thebes and Argos and to establish a common treasury, but the Isthmian artists objected, shutting the Athenians out of their assembly and refusing to pay their money into the common treasury. The dispute was appealed to the Roman Senate, which ruled in favour of the Athenian association.

==== Roman Republic ====
As Rome expanded into the Eastern Mediterranean in the second century BC, the artists sought to build ties with them. This seems to have initially been successful or at least uneventful. in the first half of the first century BC, however, evidence for the associations becomes sparse and when they do appear, they are often found supporting Roman enemies.

In 87 BC, the Athenian association strongly supported Mithridates VI in his conflict with Rome. In the course of the Sulla's siege of Athens in 87 and 86 BC, the association's facilities at Eleusis were destroyed. Their manager, Philemon, had to repair the damage out of his personal funds.

The Isthmian-Nemean association and the Cypriot branch of the Egyptian Association are last attested in the early first century BC (it is not attested in Egypt after the third century BC). The Syracusan associations are last attested in 46-45 BC.

The Ionian-Hellespontine branch successfully secured immunity from the indemnities Sulla imposed on Asia Minor later in the war. In 69 BC, they were found at Artaxata, the capital of the Roman enemy Tigranes the Great. Strabo mentions them as still active at Lebedus in the early first century AD. Continued survival into the second century AD is shown by their appearance in three inscriptions from Tralleis, Ephesus, and Magnesia on the Maeander. These inscriptions refer to them as the "local association" (Ancient Greek: τοπικὴ σύνοδος) to distinguish them from the universal association that developed in the Imperial period.

== Imperial period ==
In the Imperial period, there was a single association of artists of Dionysus which covered the entire Roman empire. Its exact title varies. In a number of early second century AD inscriptions it calls itself: "the sacred thymelic association of ecumenical artists of Dionysus, sacred victors, crown-wearers, and their fellow competitors" (Ancient Greek: ἡ ἱερὰ Θυμελικὴ σύνοδος τῶν ἀπὸ τῆς οἰκουμένης περὶ τὸν Διόνυσον τεχνειτῶν ἱερονεικῶν στεφανειτῶν καὶ τῶν τούτων συναγωνιστῶν), often inserting the name of the reigning emperor alongside Dionysus as a "new Dionysus". A sister association represented competitors and organisers of the athletic events at festivals, which was known as the "sacred xystic association of athletes, sacred victors and crown-wearers of Heracles from the inhabited world." The adjective "thymelic," literally "smoky," referred to the smoke from the altar in the centre of the orchestra in a Greek theatre and thus came to mean "dramatic" or "theatrical," while "xystic," literally "sandy," referred to the sandy grounds used for athletic events. "Sacred victors" and "crown-wearers" were terms for victors in different grades of games festival, which were legally defined from the first century AD. It seems that the new titulature of the artists was modelled on that of the athletes.

=== Formation ===
The transition from a system of several independent regional associations to a single "ecumenical" or "universal" association covering the whole Roman Empire took place in the late first century BC and early first century AD. It is associated with the development of the various Panhellenic festivals into a set "circuit" (periodos), in which all competitors were expected to attend all the top-ranking events. This, in turn, was part of the development of the Mediterranean into a unified network under Roman authority in the first century BC.

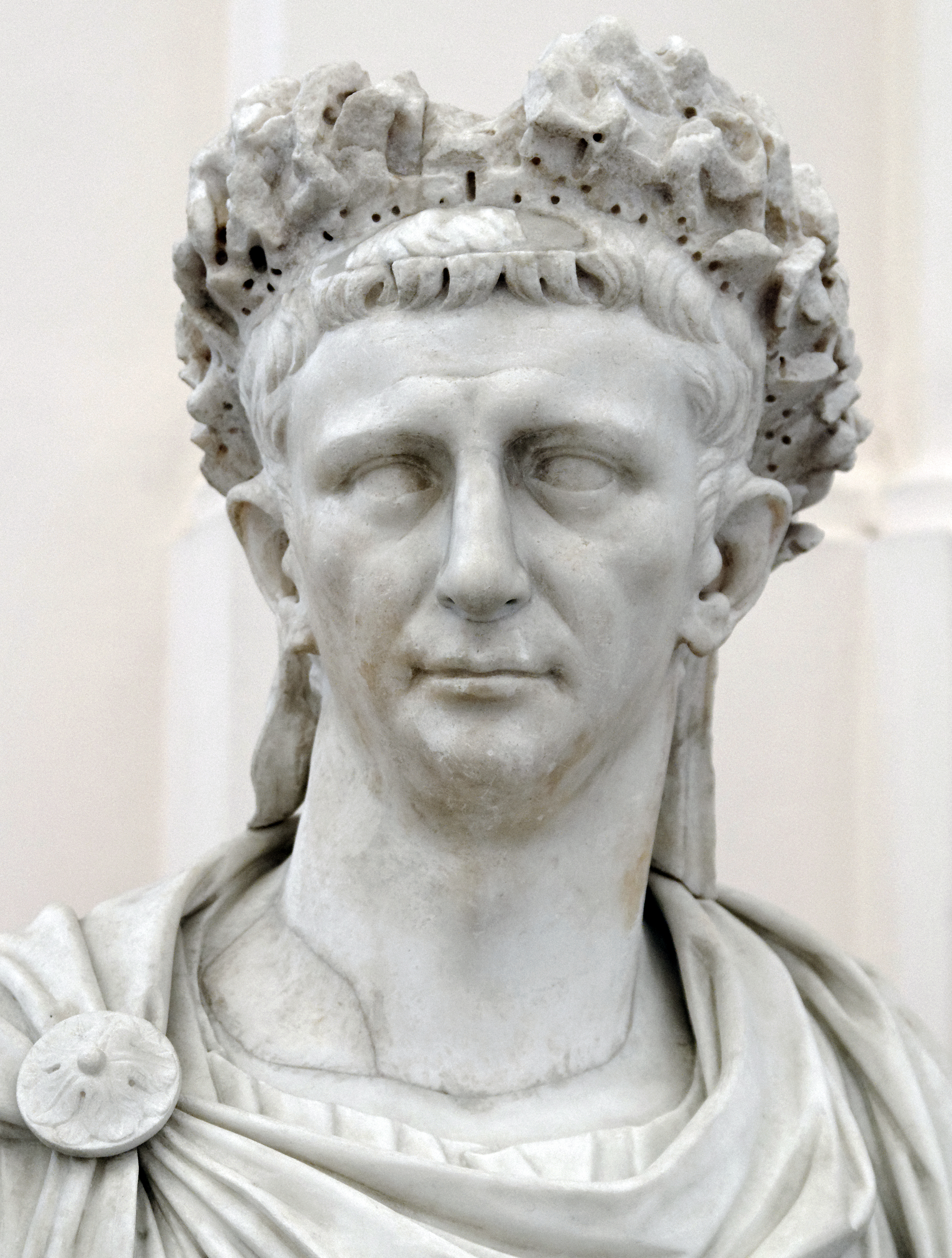
Bust of Claudius, Naples National Archaeological Museum

The athletic association first appears in a letter of Mark Antony from the 30s BC, confirming various privileges granted at an early date (perhaps by the Roman Senate or Julius Caesar). The first clear attestation of the universal association of the artists is a papyrus from 43 AD in which the Emperor Claudius (r. 41-54 AD) promises to retain various privileges that the artists had received from Augustus (r. 31 BC-14 AD). It seems that he hired them to perform at the celebrations of the conquest of Britannia in Rome in 44 AD. He reaffirmed their privileges in response to another appeal in 48 AD. The earliest surviving decree of the association is probably an inscription from Teos from the second half of the first century AD, which honours the organiser of a Dionysia Caesarea festival at which they had performed.

It is unclear how or when the universal association of the artists developed. Fauconnier proposes three possibilities: (1) the Hellenistic associations of artists merged together; (2) the Ionian-Hellespontine association claimed universal jurisdiction after the other Hellenistic associations died out; (3) the Imperial-period association was a totally new phenomenon. He prefers the last of these hypotheses, and suggests that the founding moment was in 31 BC, shortly before the Battle of Actium, when Mark Antony gathered the artists of Dionysus on Samos and then gave them a "dwelling place" in Priene. However, Le Guen interprets this as a late attestation of the Ionian-Hellespontine association.

The role of the emperors and Roman authorities in the establishment of the universal association is also disputed. Lavagne and Le Guen argue that the emperors created it, because performers were a potential source of opposition to their authority and a single universal association was easier for them to monitor. Fauconnier finds "no evidence that the imperial authorities ever took concerted action to create and develop an agonistic association." He sees the artists as the prime movers, with the emperors, particularly Claudius, playing a supportive role.

=== Organisation ===
Most evidence for the artists derives from the second and early third centuries AD, coinciding with the heyday of the Greek festival circuit. This circuit was organised by Hadrian in a set of letters to the artists, known from an inscription found at Alexandria Troas. The circuit comprised dozens of games held across Italy, Greece, and the province of Asia over the course of a four-year cycle, from one Olympic Games to the next. The artists are also attested at festivals outside the circuit in Asia, Bithynia et Pontus, Galatia, Lycia et Pamphylia, Syria, Arabia Petraea, the Aegean islands, Egypt, Thrace, Moesia Inferior, and Gallia Narbonensis.

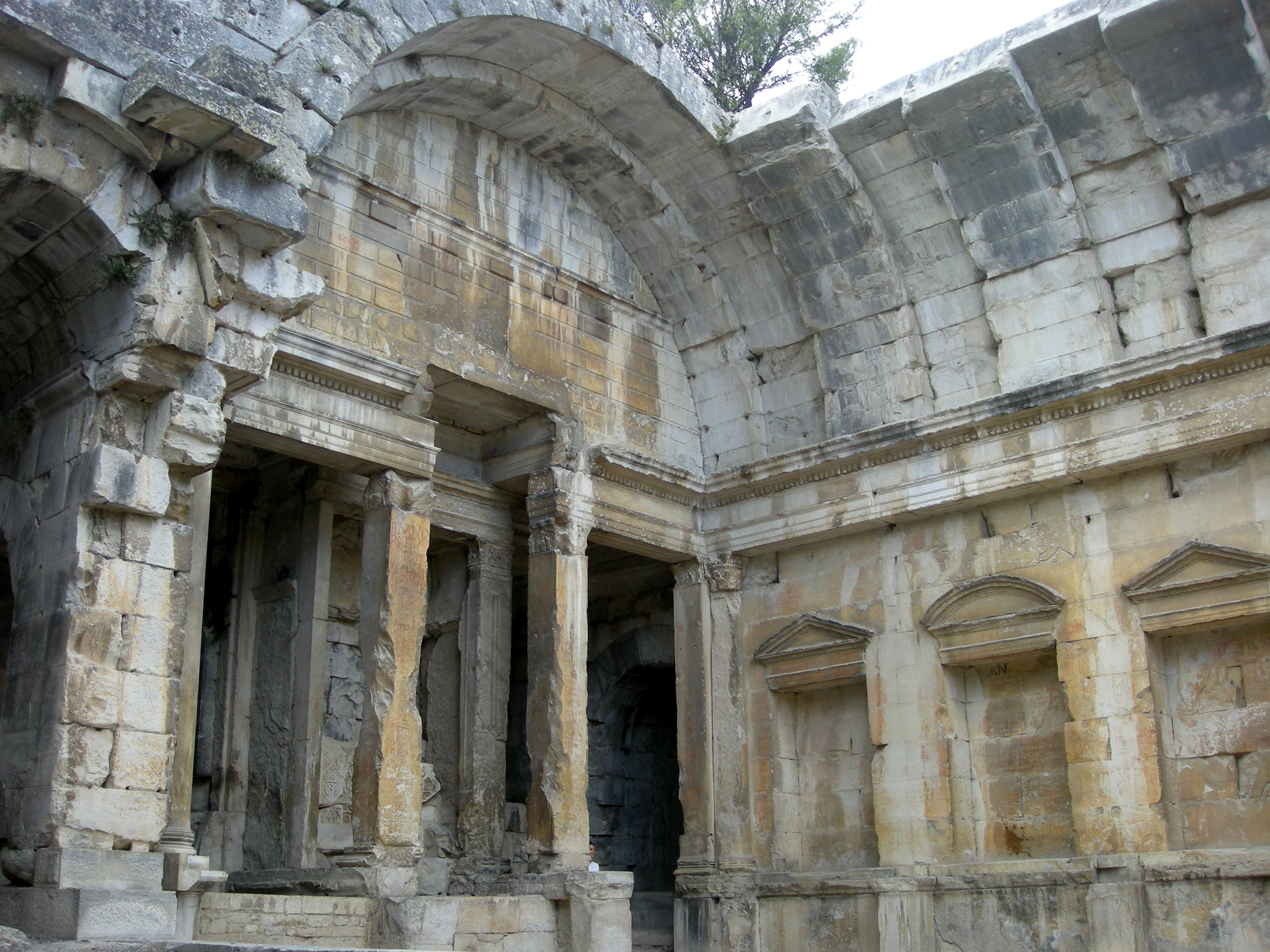
The so-called Temple of Diana in the Sanctuaire de la Fontaine in Nîmes, probably a precinct of the artists of Dionysus.

By 130 AD, the artists had a headquarters in Rome, where they had a "holy precinct" with neocorate status and a high priest. Archaeological finds suggest that this was in or near the Theatre of Pompey. The priests and officials in Rome had the greatest prestige of all the artists, controlled special funds, and dispatched decrees to the artists elsewhere. This headquarters may have been established immediately after Domitian established the Greek-style festival games, the Capitolia at Rome in 86 AD. Fauconnier thinks that the Capitolia was one reason for establishing the Roman headquarters, alongside a desire for easy access to the Imperial court, but thinks it only occurred in the reign of Hadrian. A branch office, with priests and a council chamber, certainly existed in Athens. An inscription probably indicates that the so-called Temple of Diana in the Sanctuaire de la Fontaine in Nîmes was a precinct of the artists. Another precinct is attested at Side and a "local association" is attested at Miletus, Magnesia on the Maeander, and Sardis. But there is no evidence for such branches in most of the locations where the artists performed.

The artists held assemblies, called synedria ("sitting together") or syllogoi ("speaking together"), at which they made decisions by show of hands. The resulting decrees were closely modelled on those passed by cities and leagues. These assemblies took place wherever they happened to meet on the festival circuit. Almost all surviving decrees name the festival at which they were passed. The Sebasta festival in Naples was especially important, since it was the usual venue at which the artists petitioned the emperor. Assemblies seem to have been presided over by three officials, who usually appear in the dating formulae of the decrees: the first archon (archon protos), the secretary archon (archon grammateus), and the law-displaying archon (archon nomodeiktes). These officials held office for a limited time and apparently for a limited geographic area. The latter two officials might have played a role in negotiating the artists' contracts for individual festivals. One of them was probably responsible for finances, since no separate treasurers of the association are attested. The artists had several high priests (archiereis) who operated the artists' Imperial cult. They held office for limited periods and paid a fee for the privilege. An official called the "manager" (dioiketes), who appears to have assisted in organising individual festivals at which the artists performed, is attested only in Egypt. On two occasions around AD 200, the emperors appointed curators (logistai) to take control of the artists' finances, probably to resolve specific cases of financial mismanagement.

=== Centralisation and interactions with the emperors ===
How centralised the artists were and what role was played by the regional branches is the topic of debate. Most scholars have understood it as a confederation of local branches, which reported to the headquarters in Rome. Aneziri argued that local branches played only a minor role in the Imperial-period association, contrasting this with the regional associations of artists in the Hellenistic period. Onno Van Nijf argued that the association was "a rather loose agglomeration of various overlapping groups of performers... who could all claim to be somehow connected to [the] imperially recognised, and centrally located association of Rome." By contrast, Fauconnier emphasises the uniformity of the artists' institutions, officials, and practices across the whole Roman empire and argues for "a fixed organisational structure", in which most of the association's membership, officials, and money were constantly mobile, following the festival circuit and conducting their business in whichever festival they happened to be at at the time. He argues that, while the artists had fixed local headquarters in some cities and some central decisions were taken at Rome, all artists were members of the single ecumenical association and any meeting of artists could make decisions on behalf of the whole organisation.

The artists had a close relationship with the emperors. They carried out sacrifices and other rituals for the Imperial cult. Emperors wrote to the artists regularly and often interfered in their affairs, setting their membership fees and sometimes appointing curators to oversee their finances. Hadrian rearranged the timings of festivals throughout the Roman Empire in response to appeals from the artists. Some scholars see the emperors as closely controlling the artists and their sister organisation of athletes, in order to use them as a tool in order to monitor and control festival games generally. Fauconnier argues that Imperial interference conforms to the general pattern of "petition-and-response" which characterised most Imperial interactions with their subjects, i.e. emperors usually intervened only in response to appeals from the artists themselves.

=== Membership ===
Members of the association paid a membership fee (entagion) on enrolment. The amount was the same everywhere in the Empire. In the second century AD, it may have been around 100 denarii. Papyri show that it was 250 denarii by the late third century AD (roughly equivalent to a year's rent for a good house).

Members of the association of the artists received a membership certificate. A number of these certificates survive on papyrus recovered from Egypt. They consisted of a dossier of letters from a series of emperors (Claudius, Hadrian, Septimius Severus, Caracalla, and Alexander Severus), confirming the privileges of the association; a letter to association at large announcing that the individual had been admitted and had paid the entrance fee; a dating formula by first archon, secretary archon, law-displaying archon, and the name of the festival at which the certificate was awarded; and a statement by the officials that the individual had been admitted. These certificates entitled their bearers to various privileges in their hometown.

=== Finances ===
The artists derived funding from various sources. Individual artists paid membership fees when they were enrolled and fines when they broke the association's rules. Officials and priests of the association paid a fee (like the summa honoraria) on appointment. Officials, members, and others also made donations to the artists. These often took the form of endowments of funds and real estate. They derived income from loaning the funds at interest and from rent on the real estate. For example, an inscription describes how Titus Aelius Alcibiades donated a set of stables in Rome to the artists, which they rented out to the profit of the artists in Rome and Anatolia. The artists may have charged a fee to festival organisers and/or collected a portion of the festival taxes.

The artists also had various expenses. Their sanctuaries and properties had to be maintained. They paid for honours (crowns, statues, and inscriptions) for the emperors, their benefactors, and members. Sending envoys to the emperors, to cities, and to their members throughout the empire was also expensive. They held various festivals and religious rites of their own, especially in connection with the Imperial cult. In some cases, they helped meet some of the costs of the festivals that they performed at. They may also have paid for funeral costs of their members.

The artists networks of contacts probably allowed them to organise monetary transfers (permutationes) to different parts of the empire. The banking system of the Roman Empire left it to individuals and groups to organise these transfers informally for themselves.

=== Decline ===
Epigraphic evidence for the artists falls away in the second half of the third century AD, but papyrus evidence from Egypt indicates that the association remained active throughout the century. Between 293 and 305 AD, Diocletian or one of his co-rulers issued a Latin rescript restricted the privileges of the artists to those who had won at least three victories, including at least one in Greece or Rome. This rescript refers to a single "association of athletes and musicians" (Latin: synodus xysticorum et thymelicorum) which might indicate that the artists had merged with the association for athletes or it could have been a copyist's error. It is unclear whether the restriction of privileges was requested by the artists in order to maintain their exclusivity or imposed upon them by the emperors.

The artists are not attested again after this rescript, but may have continued to exist (the association of athletes survived until around 400 AD). If so, the association would not have survived the collapse of the festival circuits over the course of the fourth century AD. Increasingly, audiences preferred to watch pantomime, rather than the tragedies and comedies that had been the mainstay of the artists. In the 380s, Libanius describes the active theatre scene in Antioch as being run by local troupes of mimes and makes no mention of the artists' association.

The term "ecumenical synod" (Ancient Greek: οἰκουμενικὴ σύνοδος), which had long been used by the artists and their sister association of athletes, was adopted by Christians to describe their own meetings in the 320s or 330s AD.

== Bibliography ==
- Aneziri, Sophia (2003). Die Vereine der dionysischen Techniten im Kontext der hellenistischen Gesellschaft: Untersuchungen zur Geschichte, Organisation und Wirkung der hellenistischen Technitenvereine. Stuttgart: F. Steiner. ISBN 978-3-515-08126-9.
- Aneziri, Sophia (2009). "World travellers: the associations of Artists of Dionysus". In Richard Hunter; Ian Rutherford (eds.). Wandering Poets in Ancient Greek Culture: Travel, Locality and Pan-Hellenism. Cambridge University Press. pp. 217–236. ISBN 9780521898782.
- Caldelli, Maria Letizia (1992). "Curia athletarum, iera xystike synodos e organizzazione delle terme a Roma". Zeitschrift für Papyrologie und Epigraphik. 93: 75–87. ISSN 0084-5388. JSTOR 20188738.
- Caldelli, Maria Letizia (1993). L'Agon Capitolinus. Storia e protagonisti dall'istituzione domizianea al IV secolo (in Italian). Istituto Italiano per la Storia Antica. ISBN 0003929388.
- Caldelli, Maria Letizia (1997). Gli agoni alla greca nelle regioni occidentali dell'Impero: la Gallia Narbonensis (in Italian). Accademia Nazionale dei Lincei.
- Ceccarelli, Paola (2004). "Autour de Dionysos: remarques sur la dénomination des artistes dionysiaques". In Hugoniot, Christophe; Hurlet, Frédéric; Milanezi, Silvia (eds.). Le statut de l'acteur dans l'Antiquité grecque et romaine (in French). Presses universitaires François-Rabelais. pp. 109–142. ISBN 978-2-86906-353-2.
- Csapo, Eric (2004). "Some Social and Economic Conditions behind the Rise of the Acting Profession in the Fifth and Fourth Centuries BC". In Hugoniot, Christophe; Hurlet, Frédéric; Milanezi, Silvia (eds.). Le statut de l'acteur dans l'Antiquité grecque et romaine. Presses universitaires François-Rabelais. pp. 53–76. ISBN 978-2-86906-353-2.
- Fauconnier, Bram (2023). Athletes and artists in the Roman Empire: the history and organisation of the ecumenical synods. Cambridge; New York, NY: Cambridge University Press. ISBN 9781009202855.
- Lavagne, Henri (1986). "Rome et les associations dionysiaques en Gaule (Vienne et Nîmes)". L'Association dionysiaque dans les sociétés anciennes. Actes de la table ronde organisée par l'École française de Rome (Rome 24-25 mai 1984). Rome: École Française de Rome. pp. 129–148. ISBN 2-7283-0122-0.
- Le Guen, Brigitte (2001). Les associations de Technites dionysiaques à l'époque hellénistique. 1: Corpus documentaire. 2: Synthese. Nancy: A.D.R.A. ISBN 9782913667037.
- Le Guen, Brigitte (2010). "Hadrien, l'empereur philhellène, et la vie agonistique de son temps. À propos d'un livre récent". Nikephoros. 23: 205–39.
- Le Guen, Brigitte (2004). "Le statut professionnel des acteurs grecs à l'époque hellénistique". In Hugoniot, Christophe; Hurlet, Frédéric; Milanezi, Silvia (eds.). Le statut de l'acteur dans l'Antiquité grecque et romaine. Presses universitaires François-Rabelais. pp. 77–108. ISBN 978-2-86906-353-2.
- Lightfoot, Jane (2002). "Nothing to Do with the Technitai of Dionysus?". In Easterling, P. E.; Hall, Edith (eds.). Greek and Roman actors: aspects of an ancient profession. Cambridge, U.K.; New York: Cambridge University Press. pp. 209–224. ISBN 0521651409.
- Remijsen, Sofie (2014). "The International Synods in the Tetrarchic Period: On the Limitation of Agonistic Privileges and the Costs of Exclusivity". Nikephoros. 27: 239–263.
- Remijsen, Sofie (2015). The End of Greek Athletics in Late Antiquity. Cambridge University Press. ISBN 9781107050785.
- Slater, W. J. (2016). "The "explosion" and "implosion" of agones". Journal of Roman Archaeology. 29: 941–949. doi:10.1017/S1047759400073049. ISSN 1047-7594.
- Van Nijf, Onno M. (2006). "Global Players. Athletes and Performers in the Hellenistic and Roman World". In I. Nielsen (ed.). Between Cult and Society. The Cosmopolitan Centres of the Ancient Mediterranean as Setting for Activities of Religious Associations and Religious Communities. Hamburg: Special issue of Hephaistos, Kritische Zeitschrift zu Theorie und Praxis der Archäologie und angrenzender Gebiete. pp. 225–235.
