= Maurice-Mollard Plaza =

Touristic town square in Aix-les-Bains, France

Maurice-Mollard Plaza Place Maurice-Mollard
- Town Square
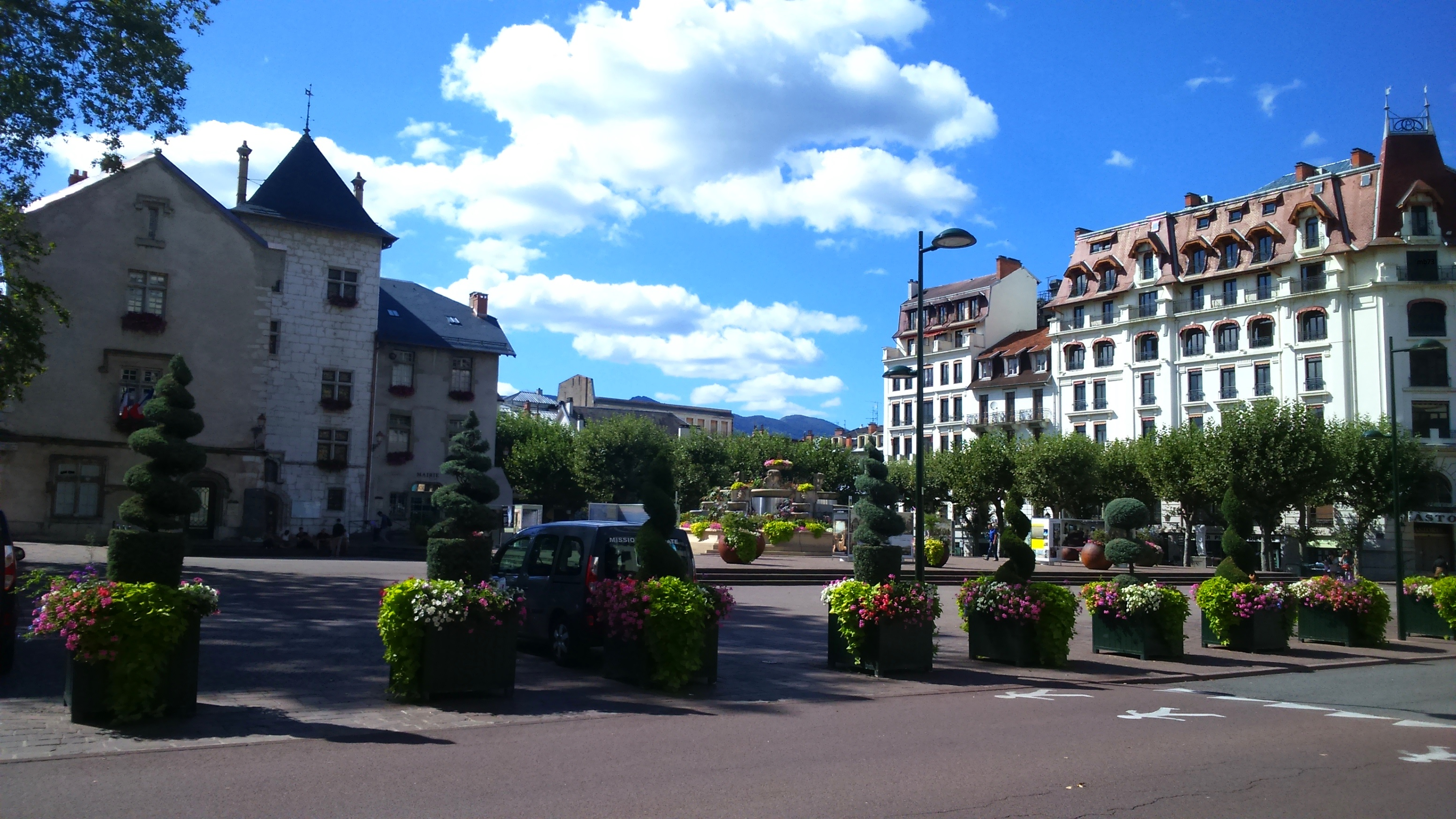
- Maurice-Mollard Plaza and the Aix-les-Bains town hall on the left.

- Flag Seal
- Nicknames: Petite place; Place de l'hôtel de ville; Place du Maréchal Pétain.
- Location within France
- Coordinates: 45°41′19″N 5°54′53″E
- Country: France
- Region: Savoy
- City: Aix-les-Bains
- District: Centre-Ville
- Monuments: Hôtel de ville d'Aix-les-Bains Temple de Diane Arch of Campanus Thermes nationaux d'Aix-les-Bains
- Adjacent to: Place Carnot, Rue Davat and Avenue Lord Revelstoke
- Creation: 1867 - 1902 - 1911 - 1922 - 1934 - 1962 - 1989

Area
  - Total: 0.006 km^{2} (0.0023 sq mi)

Maurice-Mollard Plaza, named after a former mayor of the town, is a public square in the historical center of Aix-les-Bains, in western Savoy. Rich in history, the square has undergone many changes over the centuries. It is home to a number of architectural monuments, some of which are listed as historical monuments: the Arch of Campanus and the Temple of Diana date back to Roman times; the 18th-century National Thermal Baths were partially built on the foundations of former Roman thermal baths; and the Town Hall which was originally a feudal castle. The latter is also home to an archaeological museum housing the Roman remains of Aquae, the ancient name of Aix-les-Bains.

The square provides access to a number of public services, including the registry office and the municipal council, as well as the tourist office housed in the national thermal baths. Numerous events are organized in the square, such as the "corrida des lumières" (light bullfight), and the departure point of the town's tourist train circuit.

== Location ==
The square is located in the historic center of the renowned spa town Aix-les-Bains (classified as a French Town of Art and History on 3 February 2014). It is about 450 m (1,480 ft) east of the Aix-les-Bains-Le Revard train station, and a few steps from the convention center, Notre-Dame church, and a public park.

It is extended to the north by Les Thermes Plaza and to the south by the adjacent Parc Floral des Thermes.

The square is accessible via the D913 departmental road. The connexion between Rue Davat (to the north) and Lord Revelstoke Avenue (to the south) forms the main road leading to the square.

Pedestrian routes from the town center also lead to the square, via Carnot Plaza, to the north-west and the square of Temple de Diane, to the south-west.

== Toponymy ==
The square has had several successive names. It was first called Petite Place or Place de Campanus, and Place du Marché in the 19th century. It even became known as Place de l'Hôtel de Ville when the Marquis d'Aix's château was converted into the town hall. Under the Vichy regime, the square was named Place du Maréchal Pétain.

On March 20, 1950, the municipal council decided to name the square in memory of Maurice Mollard, mayor of Aix-les-Bains from 1932 to 1937, and later a town councillor, who died in 1947. Maurice Mollard, engineer, was responsible for two major infrastructures in the Aix-les-Bains region, the Chat tunnel and the Mont Revard road.

== History ==
While many of the square's monumental features have long been known, it was only during the excavation carried out in 1988 and 1989 for the construction of the Hôtel de Ville underground parking lot, that archaeological remains or traces of human occupation were discovered, enabling us to reconstruct the possible chronology of the site, testifying to the long history of Aix-les-Bains.

=== Protohistory and Antiquity ===
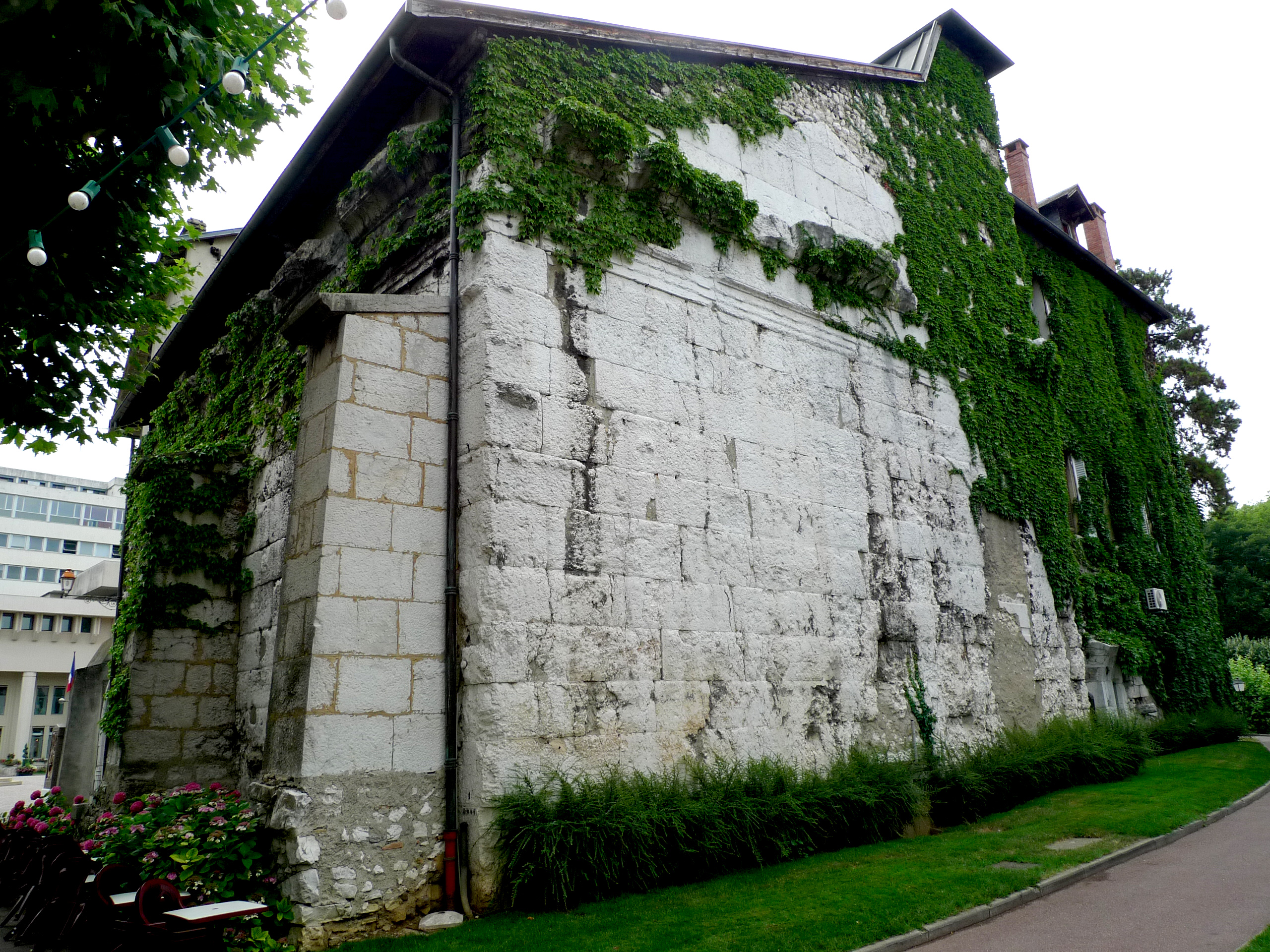
The rear of the Temple de Diane in Aix-les-Bains.

Occupation levels dating from the late La Tène culture to the early Middle Ages have been identified. In the course of their excavations, archaeologists uncovered a major thermal complex in the immediate vicinity of the square's thermal springs during Ancient history. The town's square is also home to the Arch of Campanus, probably built in the 1st century, but long integrated into a modest agricultural building. It was excavated in 1822.

=== Middle Ages ===
Little is known about the site during this period. However, during the High Middle Ages, it is assumed that the temple was reused as a place of Christian worship, along with a necropolis built around it. (Note: However, its actual dedication is unknown.)

=== Modern times ===
Up until the Age of Enlightenment, this square was home to a communal cemetery, the entrance to the Château d'Aix-les-Bains (now the Mairie d'Aix-les-Bains), and various other buildings. The château was surrounded by an enclosure, within which the temple of Diana was preserved for cultural performances.

The town square, located just a few hundred meters from the parish church (today's Eglise Notre-Dame), was thus occupied by numerous buildings and public places, but a small, restricted area, known as the Petite Place, was set aside around the church.

=== 19th century ===
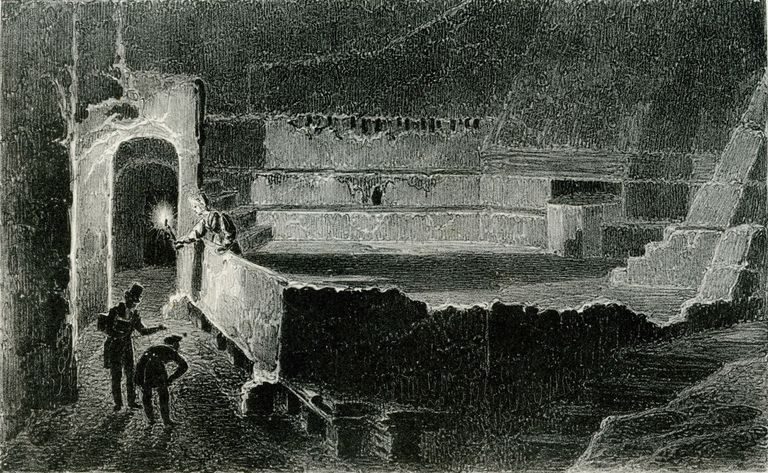
Image of the Roman thermal baths at Aix-les-Bains.

In 1867, after numerous alterations to the site, the buildings between the château and the church were expropriated. The aim was to widen another adjacent square, the Place des Bains, currently known as the Les Thermes Plaza. One particular decision was taken at the end of the 19th century: a project to demolish the old church and some of the surrounding buildings was proposed as a method of redesigning the square, but was subsequently abandoned, giving rise to the idea of holding a competition for the urban redevelopment of the square as a form of consultation.

It was during this period that the square was named Place de l'Hôtel de Ville. Rules were then laid down for the competition: sites were to be set aside for a monumental fountain and a statue of the poet Alphonse de Lamartine.

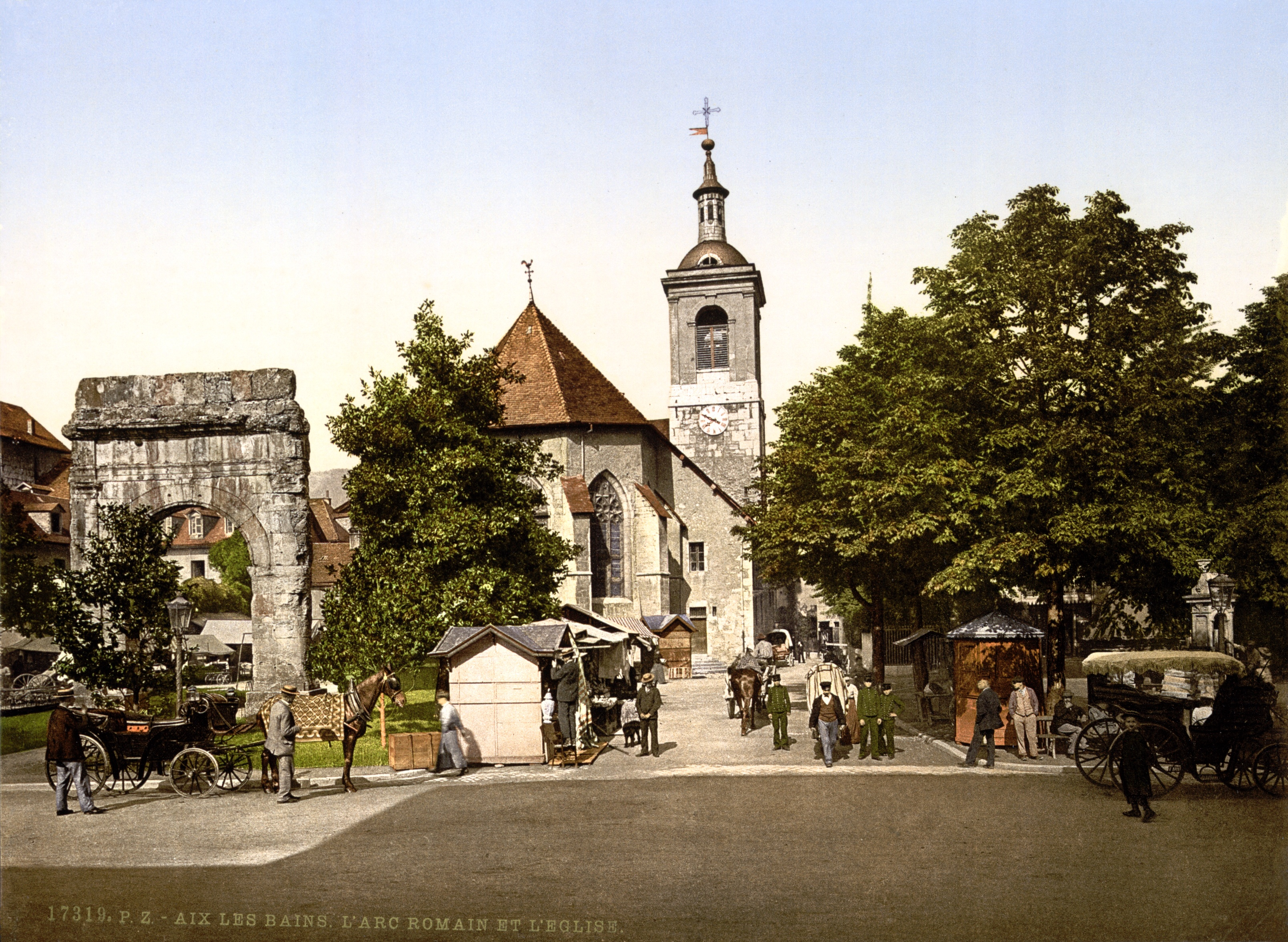
Back in the day, Aix-les-Bains with the Arch of Campanus and church.

Eight projects were selected by the town council, but in the end, it turned out to be an unplanned, unorganized development that gradually took shape, accompanied by various demolitions and modifications to the square.

=== From the 20th century to today ===
The Municipality of Aix-les-Bains carried out numerous works to embellish the square during this contemporary period. To cater to the large influx of tourists and spa-goers, the town also expanded its accommodation capacity by creating a number of luxury hotels, including a palace called Astoria, on the edge of the square in 1904.

At the beginning of the 20th century, Aix-en-Provence's municipal authorities created a number of new facilities. Firstly, in 1902, trees were planted to delineate two alleys. Space was also created for six kiosks, and a former St. Joseph religious school was demolished. By this time, a flower market had been held on the square for several years. In 1911 and 1922, kiosks were built for florists, followed by a flower pergola which was dismantled in 1933.

After World War I, a new beautification project for the square was submitted to the town council by Victor Luya, a town's engineer. He proposed a new pavement, floral arrangements, and a new traffic plan. A final phase of work was carried out in 1927.

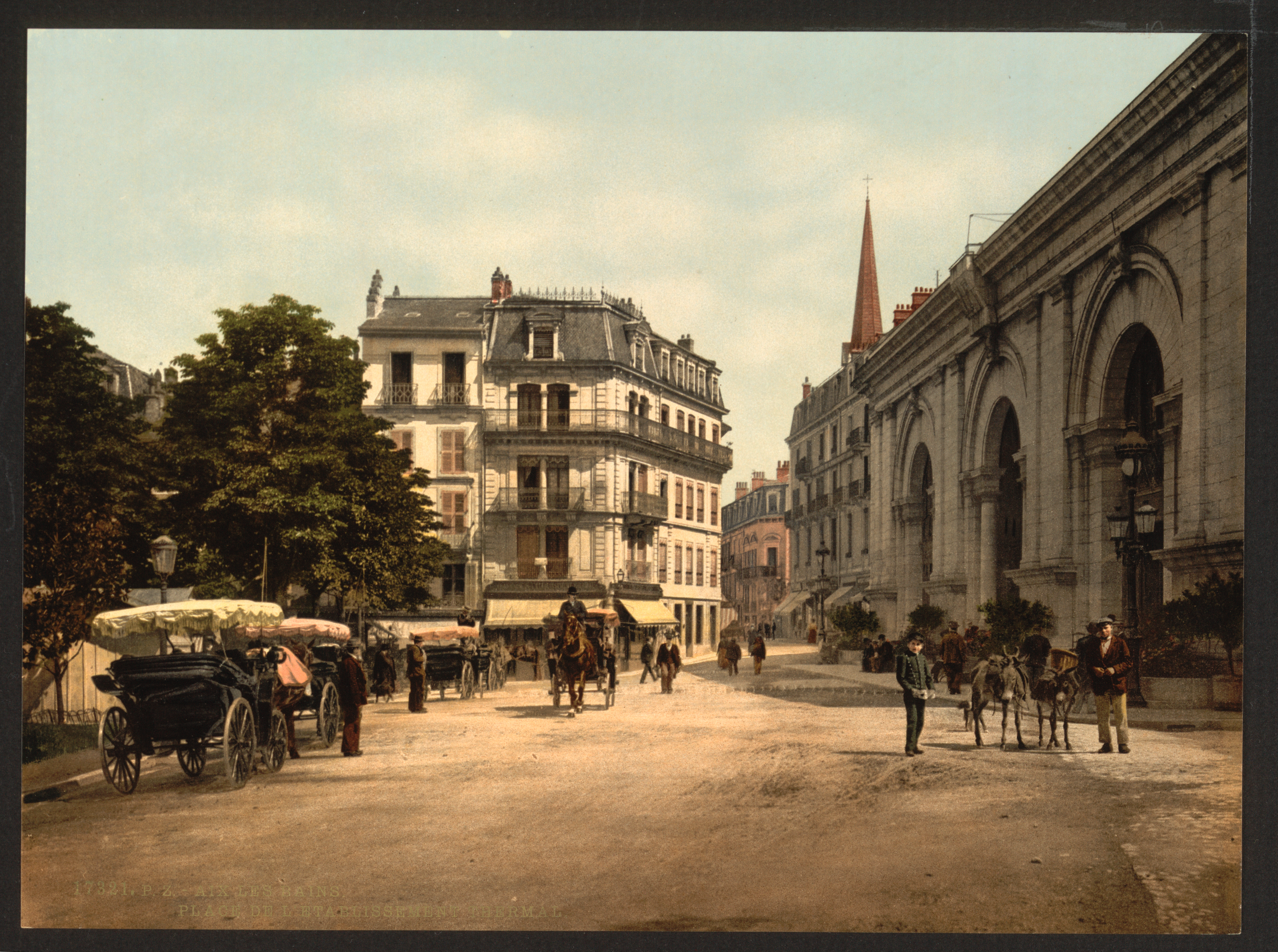
A section of the town square in the direction of the new church after the 20th-century changes.

Then, between the interwar period, in 1934, a new project was undertaken on the square. Francis Crochon, the town's architect, decided to revisit the previous work by completely redesigning the monument and road infrastructures.

Schematic plan of the town square in 2015.

On June 1, 1940, German aircraft bombed the town and surrounding area, including the square. Among other things, the war caused numerous health problems, particularly in the town center due to the massive concentration of prisoners. Diseases could proliferate more rapidly. The resort of Aix suffered badly during this period, particularly in the vicinity of its national thermal baths. In 1945, there were as many as 6,219 prisoners in the heart of the town.

The post-World War II boom in transport (Trente Glorieuses) brought further changes to the area. Traffic modifications, aimed at smoothing and redesigning existing roads, were carried out in 1955.

Further embellishments and modifications followed, including the total destruction of the remains of St. Joseph's School.

All the square's trees were cut down to create the underground parking lot for the town hall, just before a fountain was installed in the center of the square in 1989, which is now used entirely as a floral monument.

== Economy and services ==
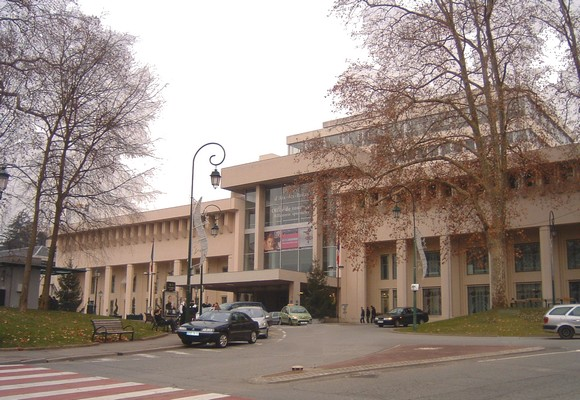
The national thermal baths at Aix-les-Bains. The entrance is located at the center of the picture.

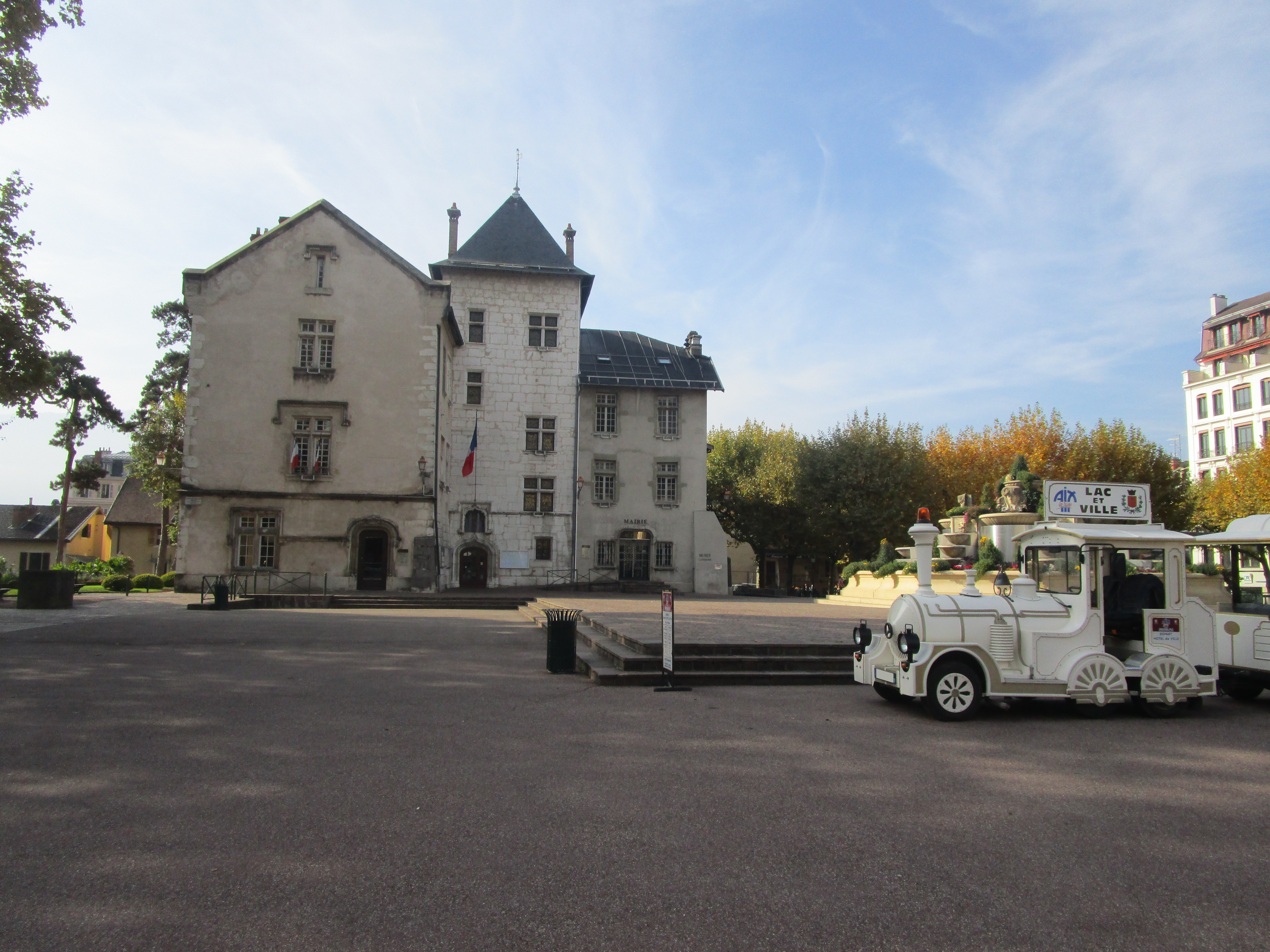
The trackless train parked in front of City Hall in autumn 2015.

There are no shops on the square, only various municipal services and tourist attractions.

Aix-les-Bains town hall is located directly on the square. It houses all the main municipal services. It also houses a museum in the north-western part of the building, on the same site as the Temple of Diana. The theme of the museum, whose collections are mainly composed of archaeological objects, is to describe the ancient history of Aquae (A. Allobrogum). Sightseeing tours are organized in summer.

In addition, the trackless train, designed for guided tours of the town during the summer season, parks on the square in front of the fountain, where the tour begins and ends. In the afternoon, the train visits the shores of Lac du Bourget.

The tourist office, which has been awarded the Qualité Tourisme label, is located at the entrance to the Aix-les-Bains national thermal baths. It is accessible from the departmental road 913, which separates the square from the spa building. There is also a beauty school in this listed building.

== Architecture and monuments ==
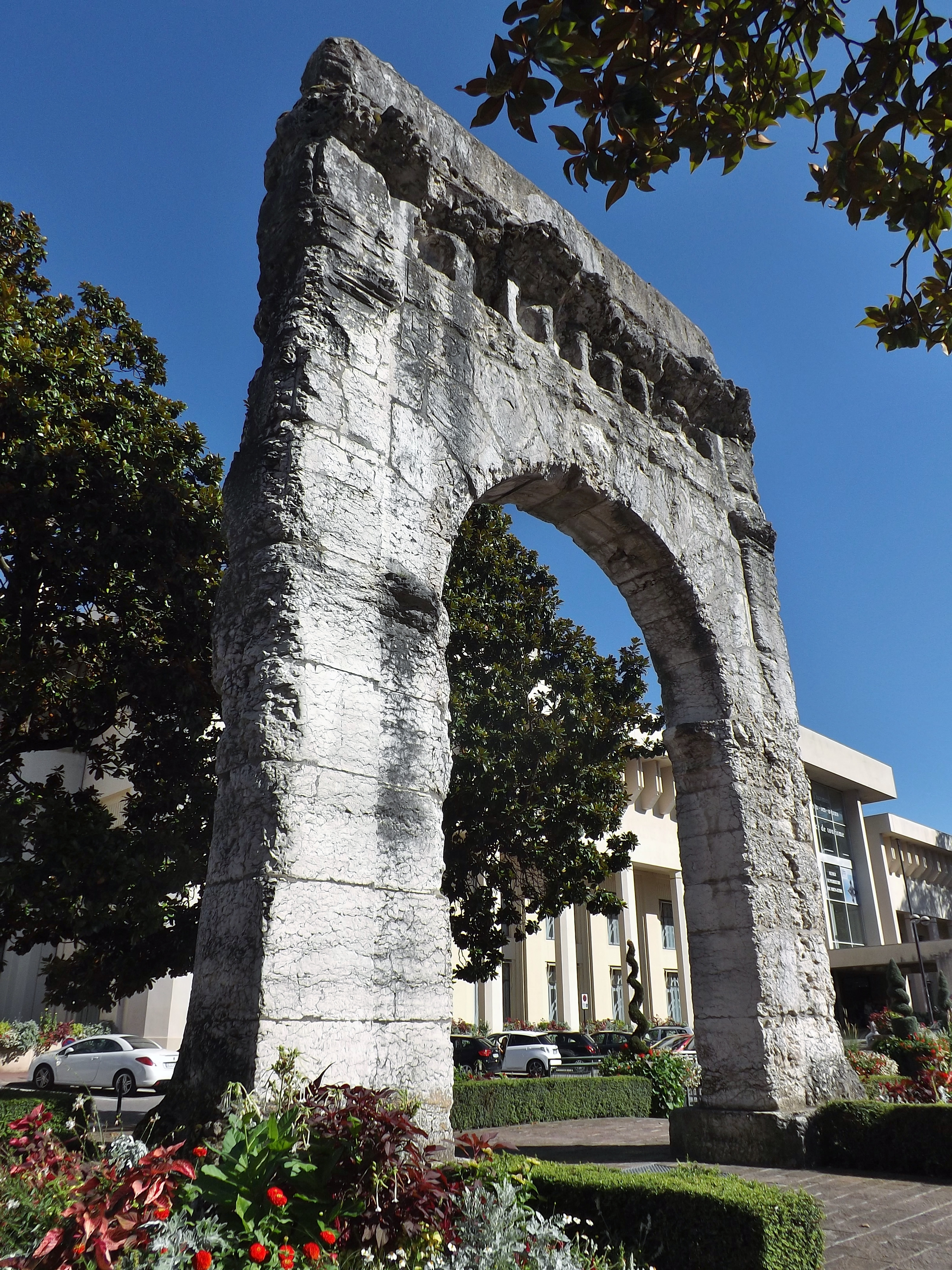
The Campanus arch.

Maurice-Mollard Plaza features a monumental, flower-filled fountain at its center, raised on porphyry paving stones. The northern part of the square is embellished with tree-lined avenues, bordering Les Thermes Plaza and the Square du Temple de Diane d'Aix-les-Bains.

A grassy area planted with trees and flowers occupies the southern part of the square, in the middle of which stands a staircase giving access to Lord-Revelstoke Avenue (D913). Here, you'll find the Hôtel de Ville square, located above the entrance to the underground parking lot. Several historic monuments are located on and near the square:

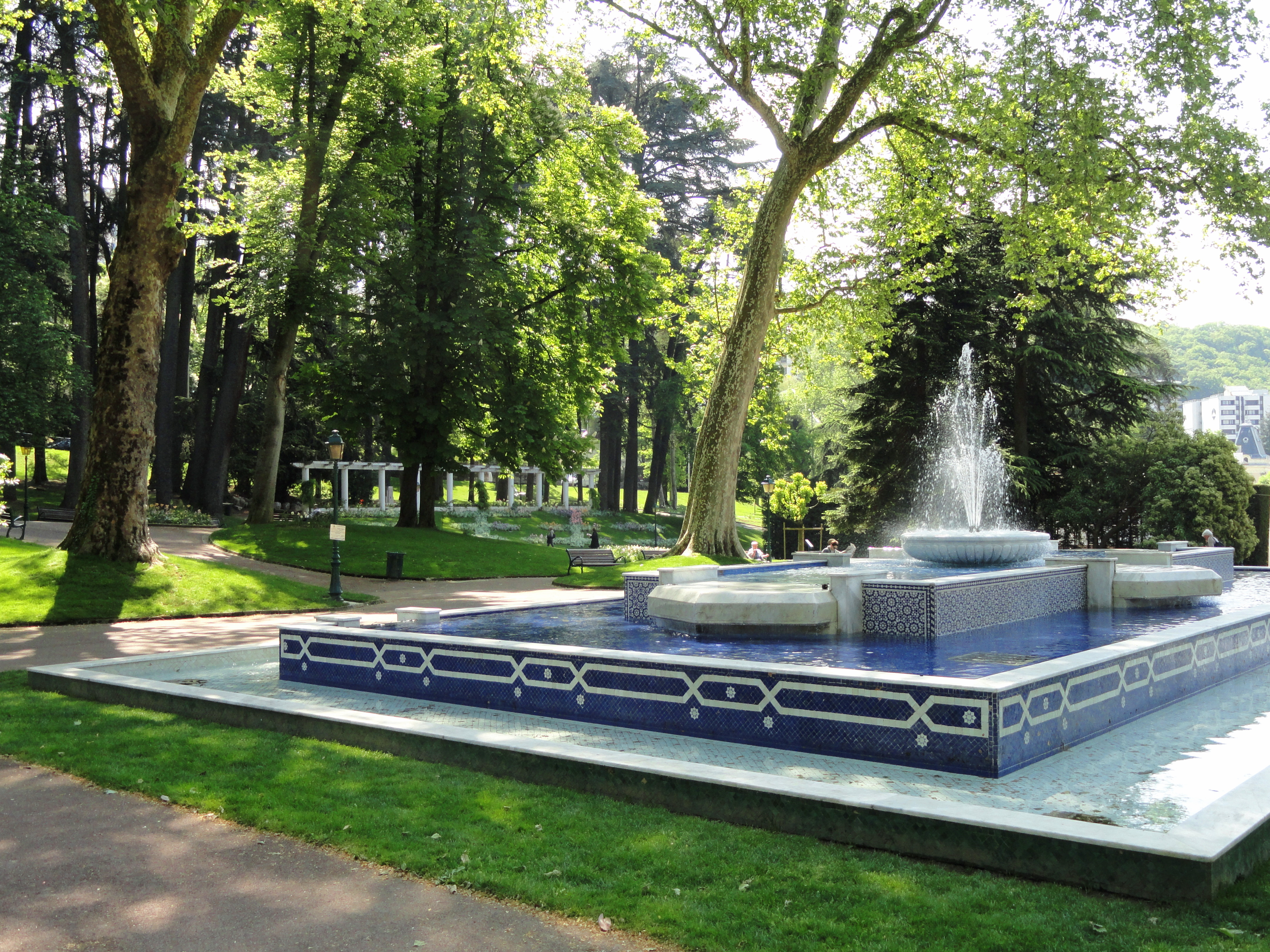
Parc des Thermes with its central Moroccan fountain, built to mark the fiftieth anniversary of the Moroccan independence negotiations held in Aix in 1955.

- The Aix-les-Bains town hall, resulting from the redevelopment of a 16th-century château, has been listed as a historic monument since August 7, 1890 for its staircase, and since December 11, 1982 for the entire building apart from the north wing.
- The Temple of Diane in Aix-les-Bains, adjoining the town hall to the northwest, is one of only three classical-style Roman temples to have been completely preserved in France, alongside the Maison Carrée in Nîmes and the Temple of Augustus and Livia in Vienne, and has been listed as a historic monument since 1875.
- The former national thermal baths of Aix-les-Bains have an entrance on the Maurice-Mollard Plaza side leading to the 913 departmental road. The building has been listed as a historic monument since April 24, 1986.
- The Arch of Campanus, a Roman monument dating from the 1st century B.C., has been listed since August 7, 1890.
- To the south of the square lies the Thermes floral park, once considered the city's most beautiful promenade. It was listed on April 23, 2008.

== Appendix ==
=== Related articles ===
- fr:Histoire d'Aix-les-Bains
- fr:Liste des monuments historiques de la Savoie

=== External links ===
- Joël Lagrange, Marie-Reine Jazé-Charvolin, "Petite Place, puis place du Marché, puis place de l'Hôtel de ville, puis Maréchal Pétain, actuellement place Maurice Mollard" archive, at www.patrimoine-aixlesbains.fr archive, Inventaire général du patrimoine culturel and Ville d'Aix-les-Bains, 2005 (accessed on February 27, 2017).
- "Mollard Maurice: Ancien sénateur de la Savoie" archive, on www.senat.fr archive, Sénat, February 27, 2017 (last updated) (accessed on February 27, 2017).

=== Bibliography ===
- Antoine Troncy et Laurence Troncy, La Savoie 1900-1920, Editions de Borée, 2000, 179 p. (ISBN 978-2-84494-040-7)
- Amédée Achard et Eugene Ginain, Une saison à Aix-les-Bains par Amédée Achard: illustrée par Eugène Ginain, Ernest Bourdin, 1850, 358 p.
- Ghislain Garlatti, Histoire des Marches: à l'ombre du Granier, chronique d'un village de Savoie, La Fontaine de Siloé, 2007 (réimpr. 2007), 157 p. (ISBN 978-2-84206-343-6, read online archive)
- F. Vidal, Aix-les-Bains en 1867, 1867, 62 p. (read online archive)
- Page Léon, Promenons-nous dans les rues d'Aix, Aix-les-Bains, 1978, 284 p.
- Canal Alain, Rapport de prospections archéologiques, Aix-les-Bains, 1987, 40 p.
