= Sanctuaire de la Fontaine =

Sanctuary located in Gard, in France

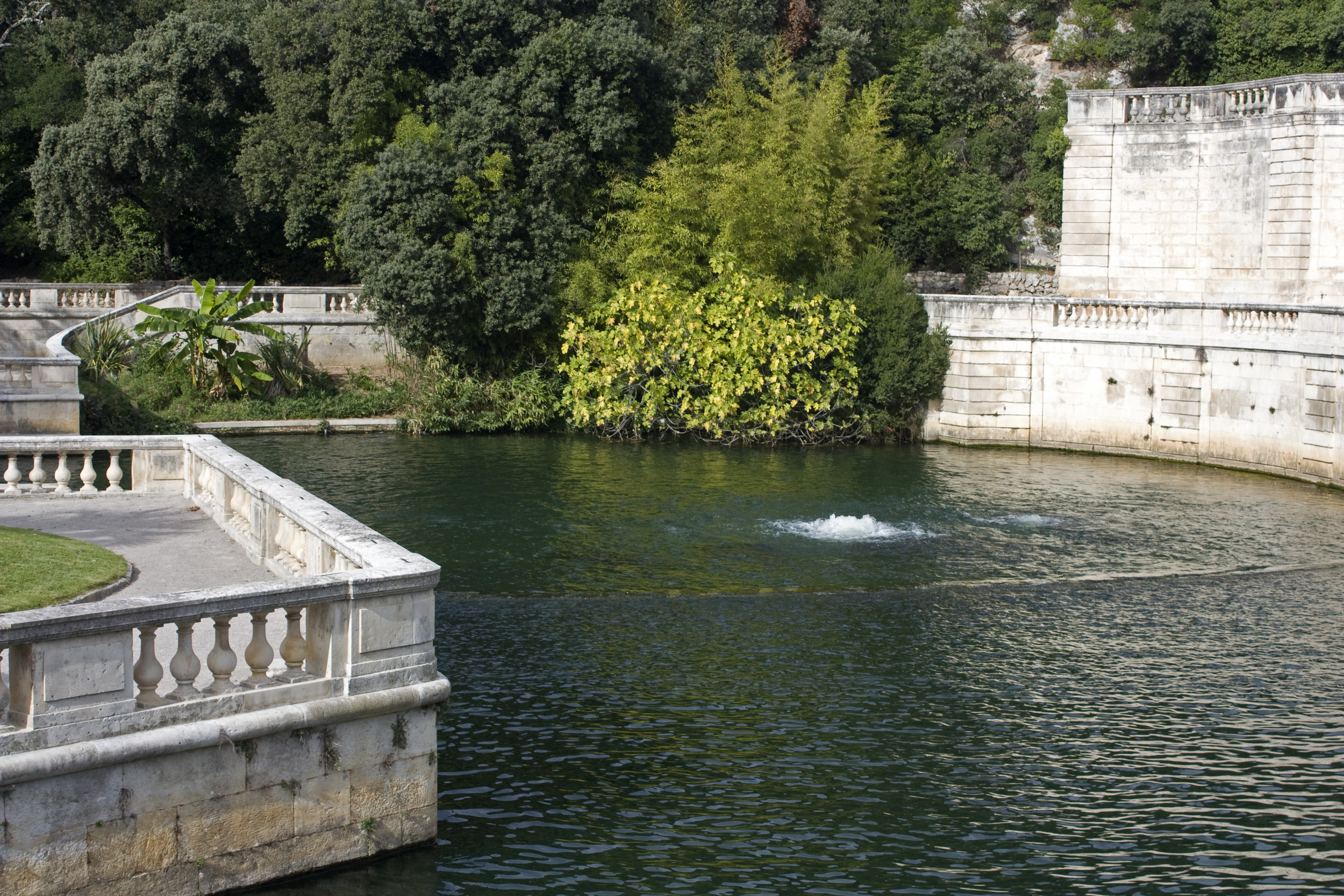

- Location within France
- 43°50′25″N 4°20′56″E
- Type: Ancient Temple
- Location: Nîmes, Gard, Occitanie, France
- Part of: Jardin de la Fontaine

History
- Built: 1st century

Site notes
- Public access: Open to the public

The Sanctuaire de la Fontaine (English: Sanctuary of the Fountain) is an ancient site in the city of Nîmes, France. A probable place of worship of the first human settlement around the source, this site is located today in the heart of the Jardins de la Fontaine.

== Description ==
At the site of the original spring on which the city was founded, the fountain had a central role, as a site of worship for the god Nemausus. Shortly before the beginning of our era, an altar was set dedicated to the worship of Augustus. As time went by, a veritable sanctuary dedicated to the imperial cult was set up around the fountain.

In this "Augusteum" in addition to this emperor's altar arranged in the center of a nymphaeum, a theater, and a curious vaulted building called the “Temple of Diana”. It is not known whether this really is a temple, as there are indications that it is a library. Many hypotheses have been made about this building, but none have been proven true.

This type of sanctuary is quite rare, especially since contrary to what one might imagine, it was not ordered by Augustus, but was probably built by the local populations in a show of gratitude for the favors granted to the city. The fact of installing this temple in an already religiously important place is of strong symbolic value.

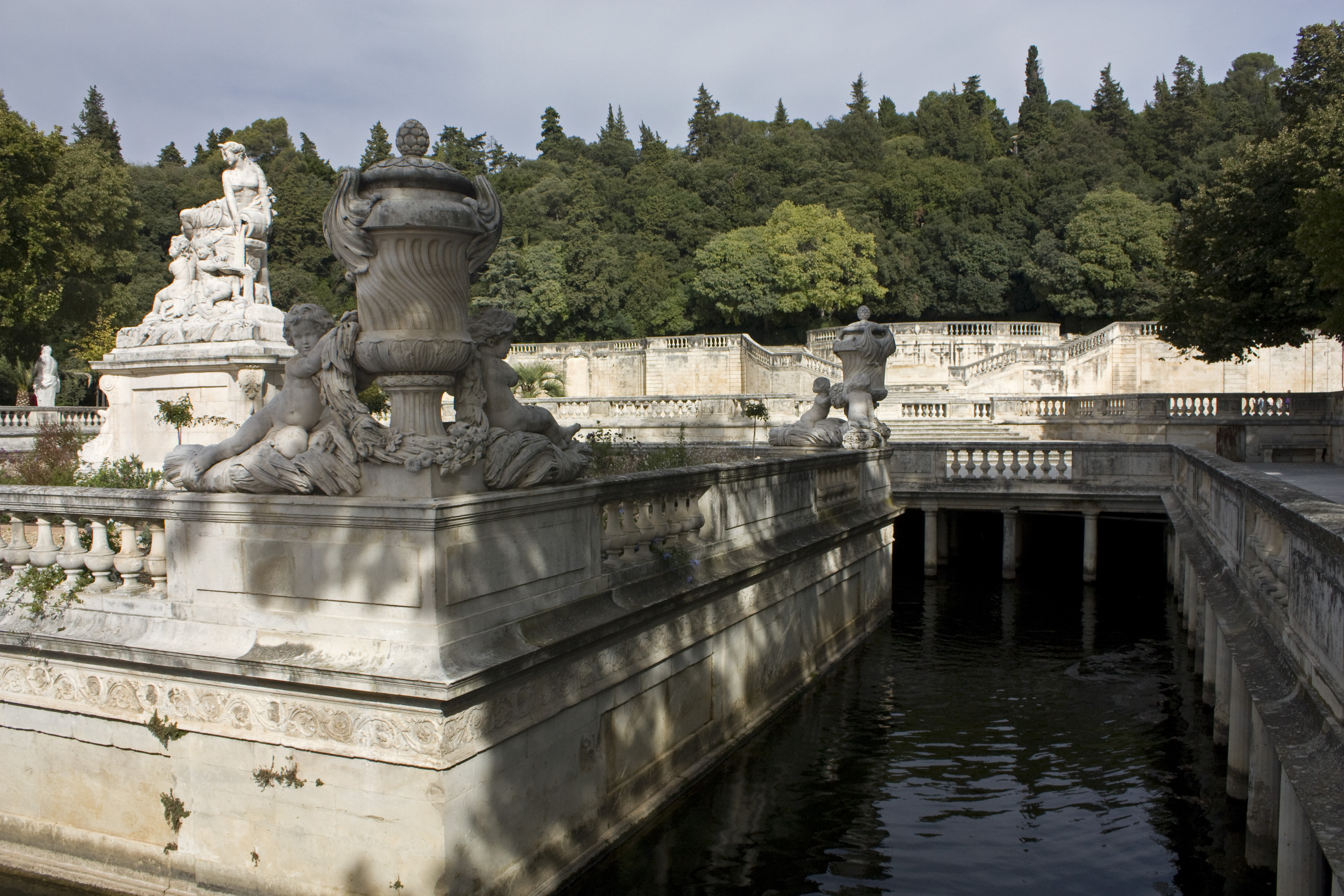
Main Nyphaeum

The functioning of the imperial cult is initially different from a true religious cult, since emperors are not deified until their death, and not in all cases. In a way, the emperor is placed between gods and men. But above all, the goals of establishing imperial worship are more political than religious. This cult is part of the process of romanization of a colony like Nîmes. Although it is mandatory, it is still an opportunity for the colonies to show their attachment to Rome.

This system largely contributed to a natural Romanization of the city, of which the imperial cult was the essential cog. Its obligation, along with all the other cities conquered by Rome simultaneously made it possible to unify the Empire by imbuing the populations with a common mentality. Despite everything, the imperial cult still takes different forms according to the times and regions. Thus in Narbonne it is much stronger than elsewhere, since the region was conquered very early on. It also took different forms depending on the emperor in power. We know, for example, that Augustus had a very close relationship with Nîmes where he was much loved.

For each province, the imperial cult had an official altar planted in the capital on which a high-ranking priest performed a sacrifice. Still, this did not prevent colonies like Nîmes from paying homage to the Emperor on their own, as the Augusteum attests. The ceremonies that were organized there were led by a municipal flamine and servers who were kinds of priests whose role is not fully understood. We only know that these were very prestigious roles. .

== See also ==
- Temple of Diana
