= Arch of Campanus =

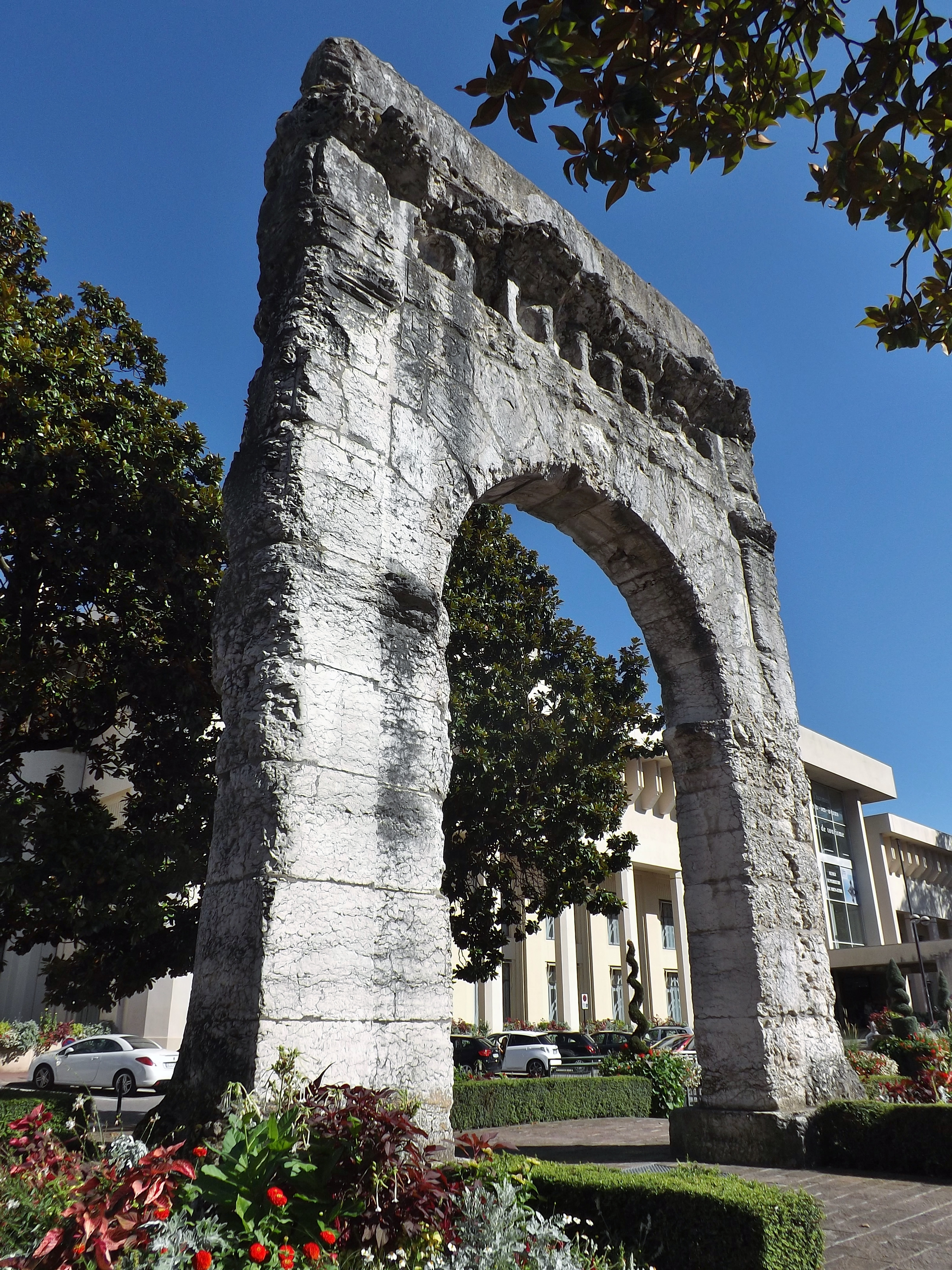
- The Roman Arch of Campanus
- Interactive map of Arch of Campanus
- Location: Aix-les-Bains, Savoie, Rhône-Alpes, France
- Coordinates: 45°41′21″N 5°54′56″E
- Completion date: 1st century

The Arch of Campanus is an ancient Roman funerary monument located in the commune of Aix-les-Bains, Savoie, Rhône-Alpes, France. Erected in the 1st century AD, it has been classified as a French monument historique since 7 August 1890.

== History ==
The original Roman settlers at Aix-les-Bains (Roman: Aquae) seem to have arrived in the 1st century, on account of the presence of hot springs (see Thermae). Linked administratively to the city of Vienne, the city was a vicus with a council of decemlecti (municipal council of ten members).

The city possessed important thermae in the very centre of the city, beside which, on a lower terrace to the west, the funerary Arch of Campanus was built and below a second terrace on which a temple of Diana was constructed in the second century.

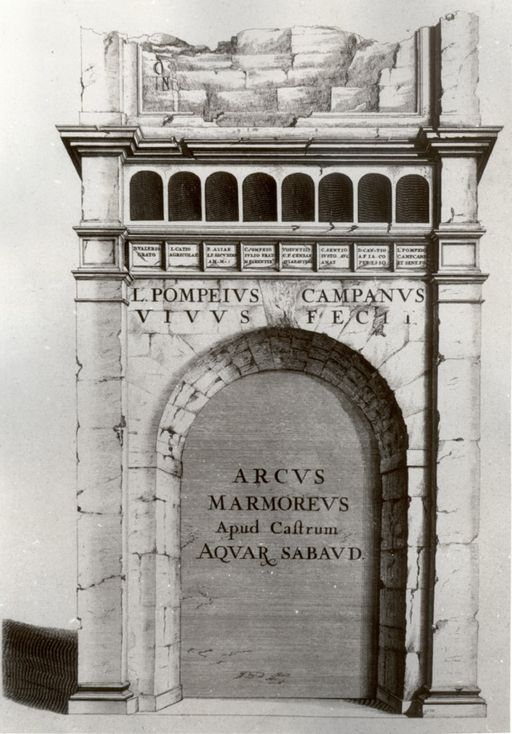
The Arch of Campanus in an etching by Borgonio in 1674

The arch was erected at the end of the 1st century by Lucius Pompeius Campanus, a patrician of Gallia Narbonensis, a rich notable Allobroge from the city of Vienne (to which Aquae was subordinate).

Although the arch bears inscriptions in honour of the Campanus family (the monumental glorification of elites and their families was an innovation of this era), the function of the monument remains uncertain.

It is thought to be a funerary arch, but is however a long way from the Roman cemetery and Roman religious custom would not permit interments within the city.

On the other hand, the arch is placed in such a way as to offer a view in the direction of the thermae, and a walkway passed under it, so the idea that the arch is a city gate is more probable. Further support for this derives from the fact that the thermae, the temple, and the arch are contemporary.

Forgotten, the arch became the entrance to the courthouse in the 16th century and was later integrated into the wall of a stable, gradually buried, and finally rescued in 1821. It remained standing after the destruction in 1867 of a hotel that stood in the middle of the modern Place Maurice Mollard.

=== Construction ===
The arch is 9.15 metres high and 7.1 metres wide, but only 75 centimetres deep. Its limestone blocks are placed without mortar. Its single vault is a semicircular arch of 6 by 3.5 metres, under which there was a paved walkway.

Above the two pylons is an entablature with an architrave and a frieze of eight niches which probably contained busts. On the west facade, the names of Lucius Pompeius Campanus' ancestors are engraved.

== See also ==
- List of Roman triumphal arches
- Ancient Roman architecture
- Maurice-Mollard Plaza
