= Summa honoraria =

The summa honoraria (or summa legitima) was a sum that civic magistrates and priests paid upon entering their office in the cities of the Roman Empire.

In some places, like the Caesarian colony at Urso, duoviri and aediles were required to contribute 2000 sesterces towards the cost of the public games. Inscriptions from other cities record sums that typically range from 3000 to 35,000 sesterces. At Calama in Roman Numidia, a newly elected pontifex is recorded as having paid 600,000 sesterces as their initiation fee.

The summa honoraria was largely a phenomenon of the Latin West. In the Greek East, the function was played by the liturgy, by which some cost was imposed on the wealthy whether holding an office or not.
