= Temple of Diana (Nîmes) =

Ancient Roman building in Nîmes, France

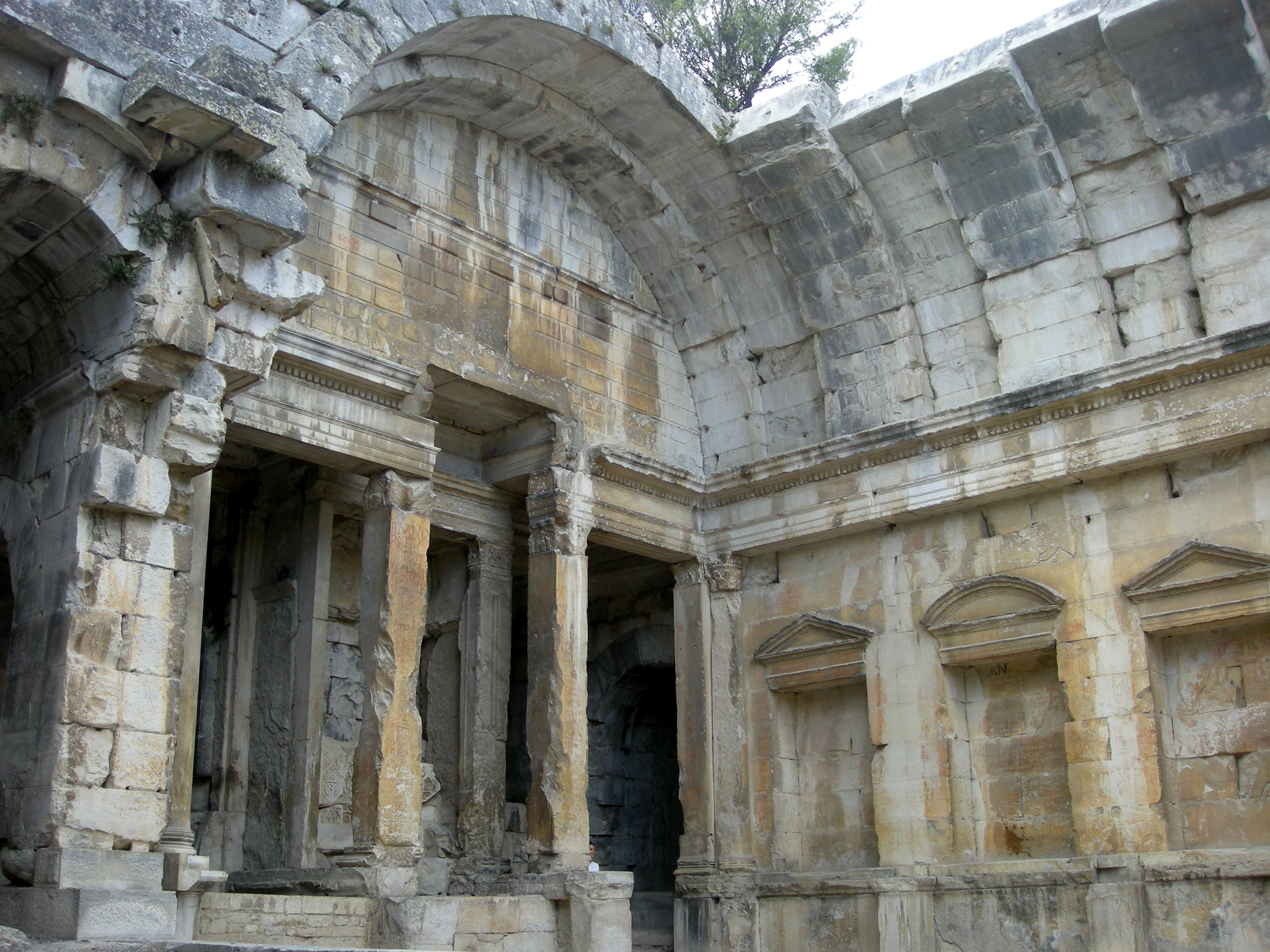
Temple of Diana

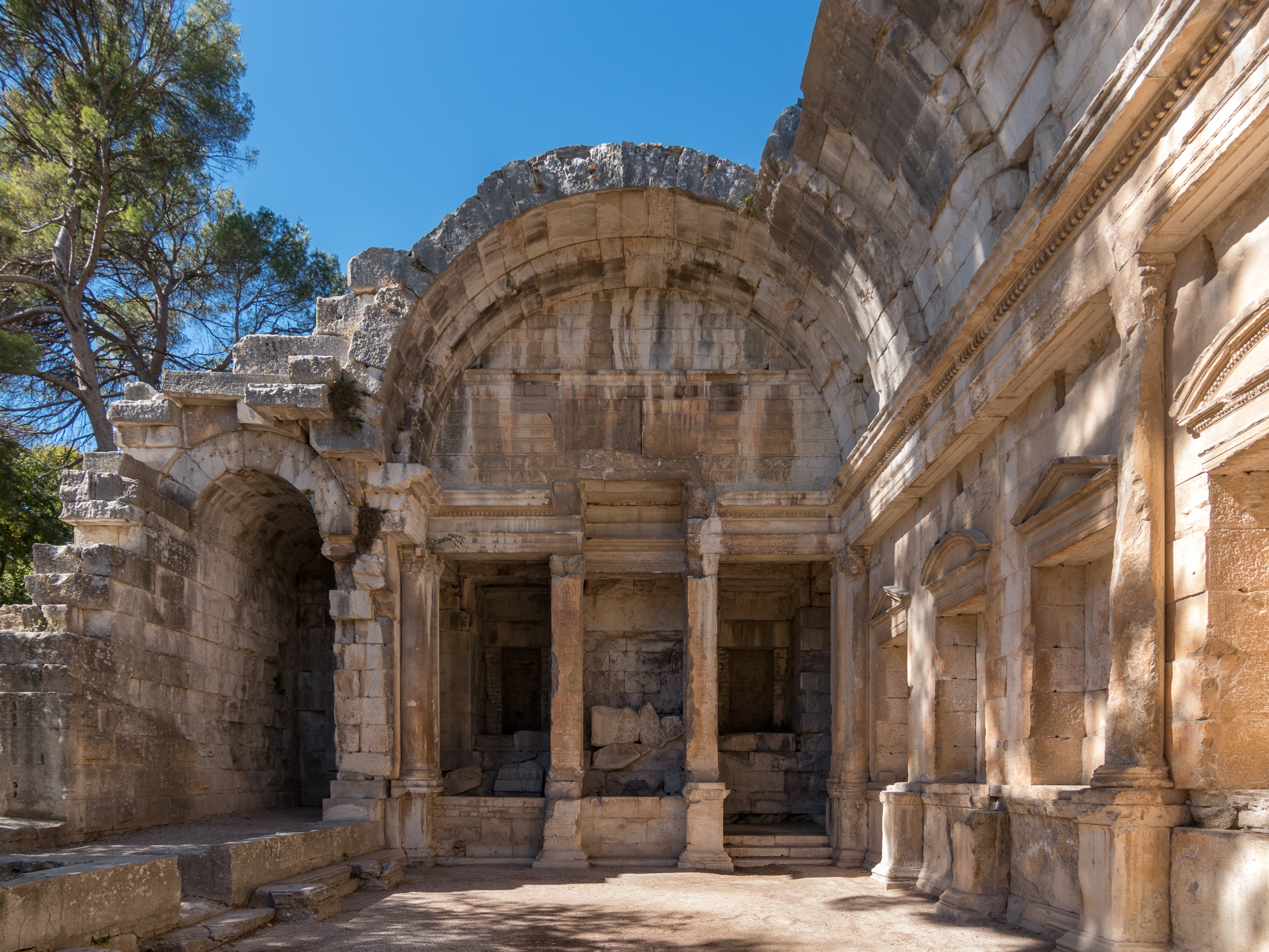
Interior

The so-called Temple of Diana is a 1st-century ancient Roman building in Nîmes, Gard, France, built under Augustus. It is located near the gushing spring of "La Fontaine", around which was an Augusteum, a sanctuary devoted to the cult of the emperor and his family, centred on a nymphaeum. Its basilica-like floor plan argues against it being a temple and there is no archaeological or literary evidence for its dedication to Diana.

The building may instead have been a library. Its facade was rebuilt during the 2nd century and in the mediaeval era it housed a monastery, ensuring its survival.

It was excavated in 1745 during work to create the garden of La Fontaine.

It was painted by Hubert Robert and other 18th century painters and was made a monument historique in 1840. It is now accessible from the Jardins de la Fontaine.

== Structure ==
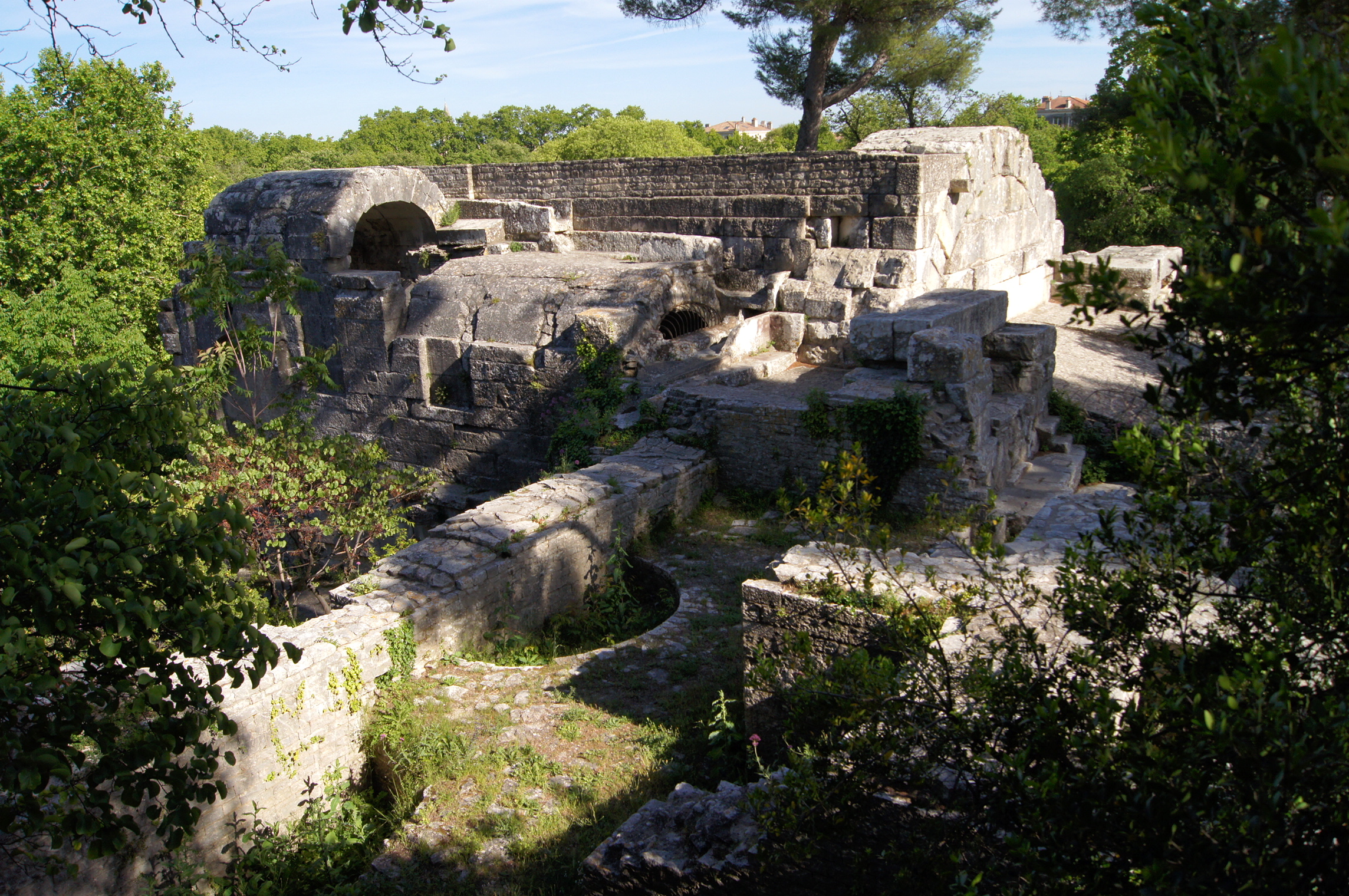
Building from above showing vaults

Its roof construction is unusual in that it consists of several elaborate thick barrel-vaulted rooms using carefully cut ashlars supporting an upper floor.

Partly dug into the side of Mount Cavalier, the building was originally flanked by annexes. The main facade is pierced by three large arches.

The remains consist mainly of a vaulted hall of 14.5 x 9.5 m, flanked by two staircases to missing semi-detached buildings. The north side wall has a series of five rectangular niches surmounted by alternate triangular and semi-circular pediments. Between each niche was a column of composite order. Three other rooms have ceilings decorated with carved coffered ceilings.

The ancient opus sectile floor made of precious marble shapes of various colours backed by mortar was discovered during the excavations of 1745.

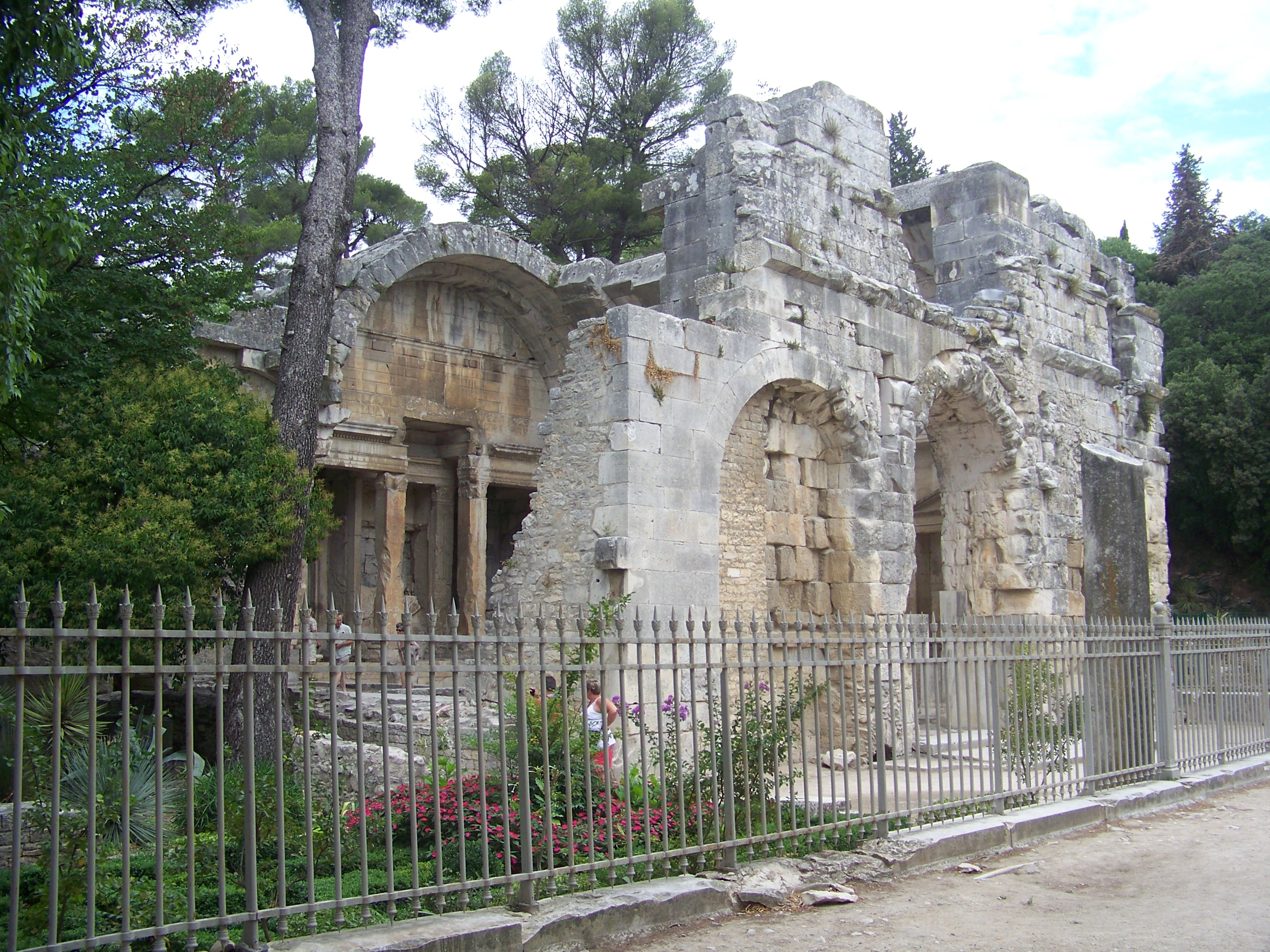

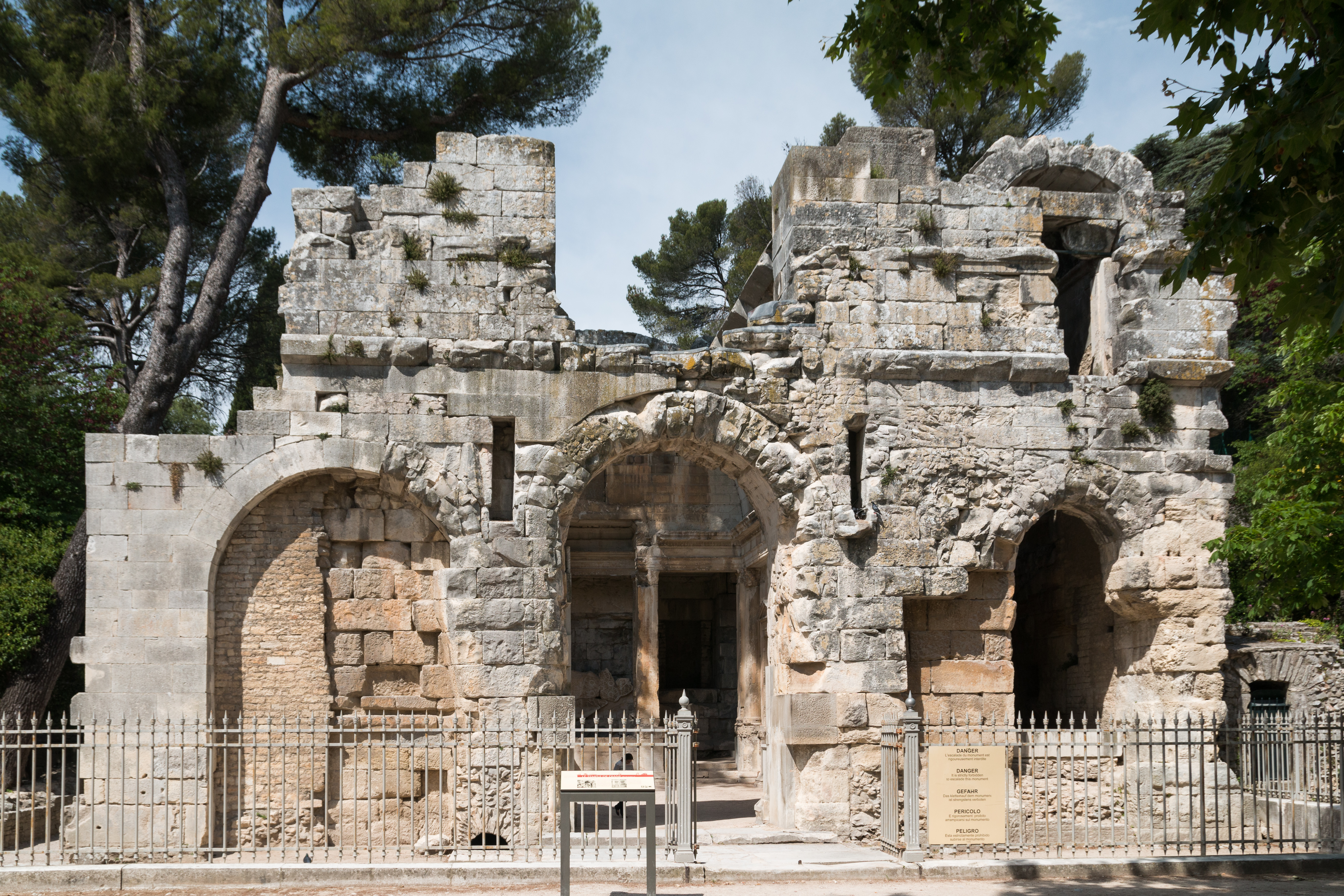
Arched bays of the main façade

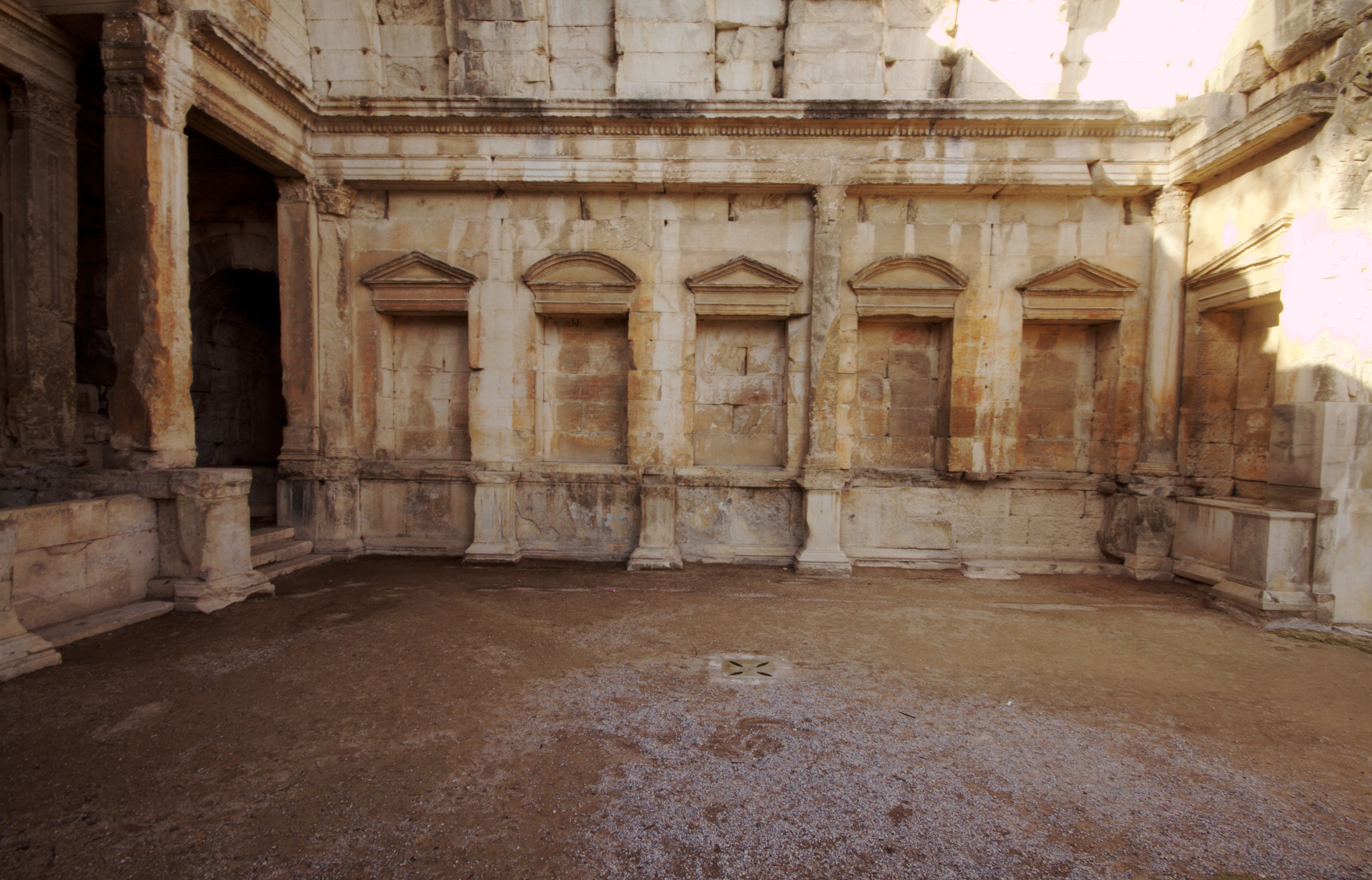
North wall with rectangular niches

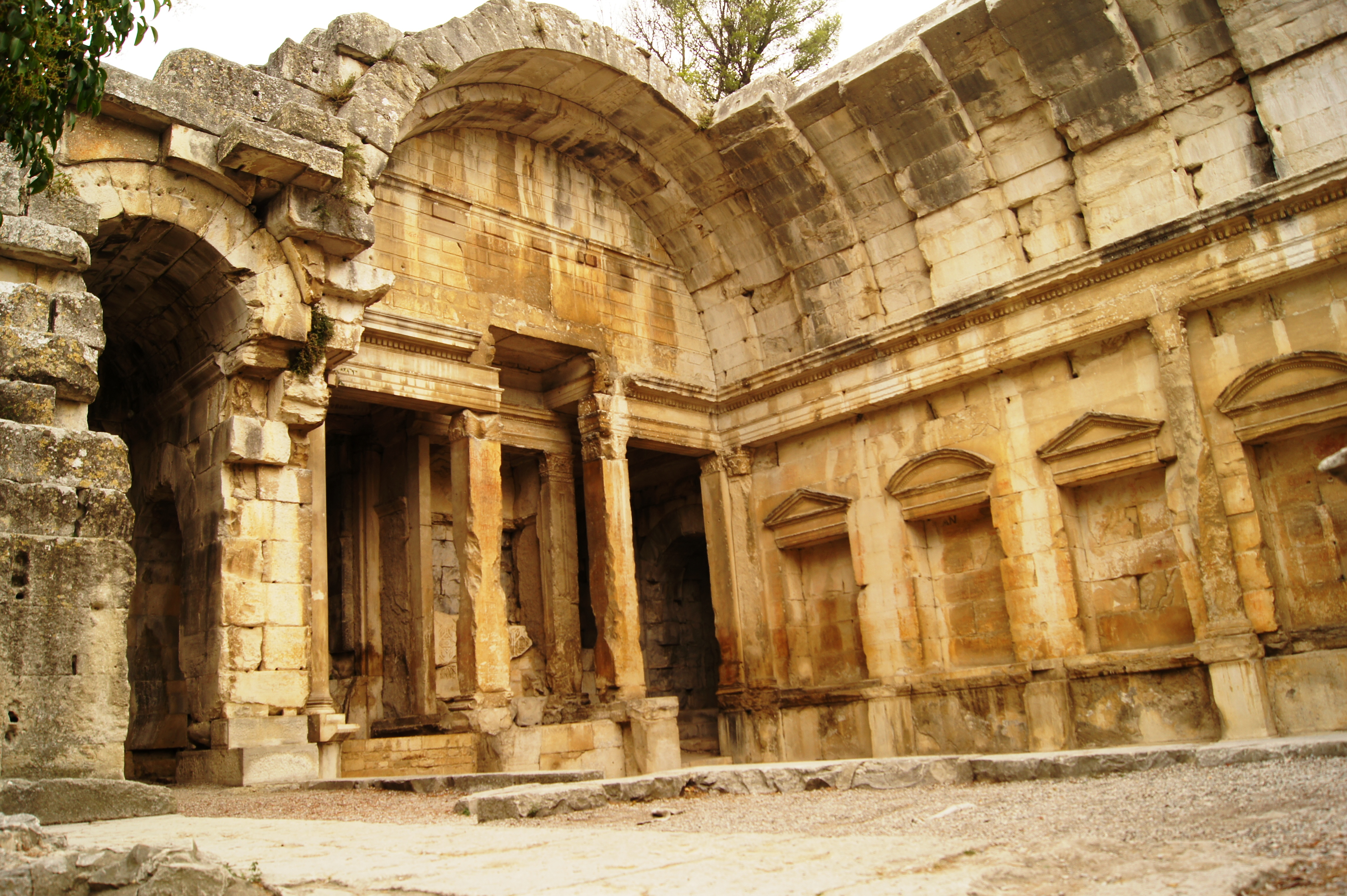
Vault

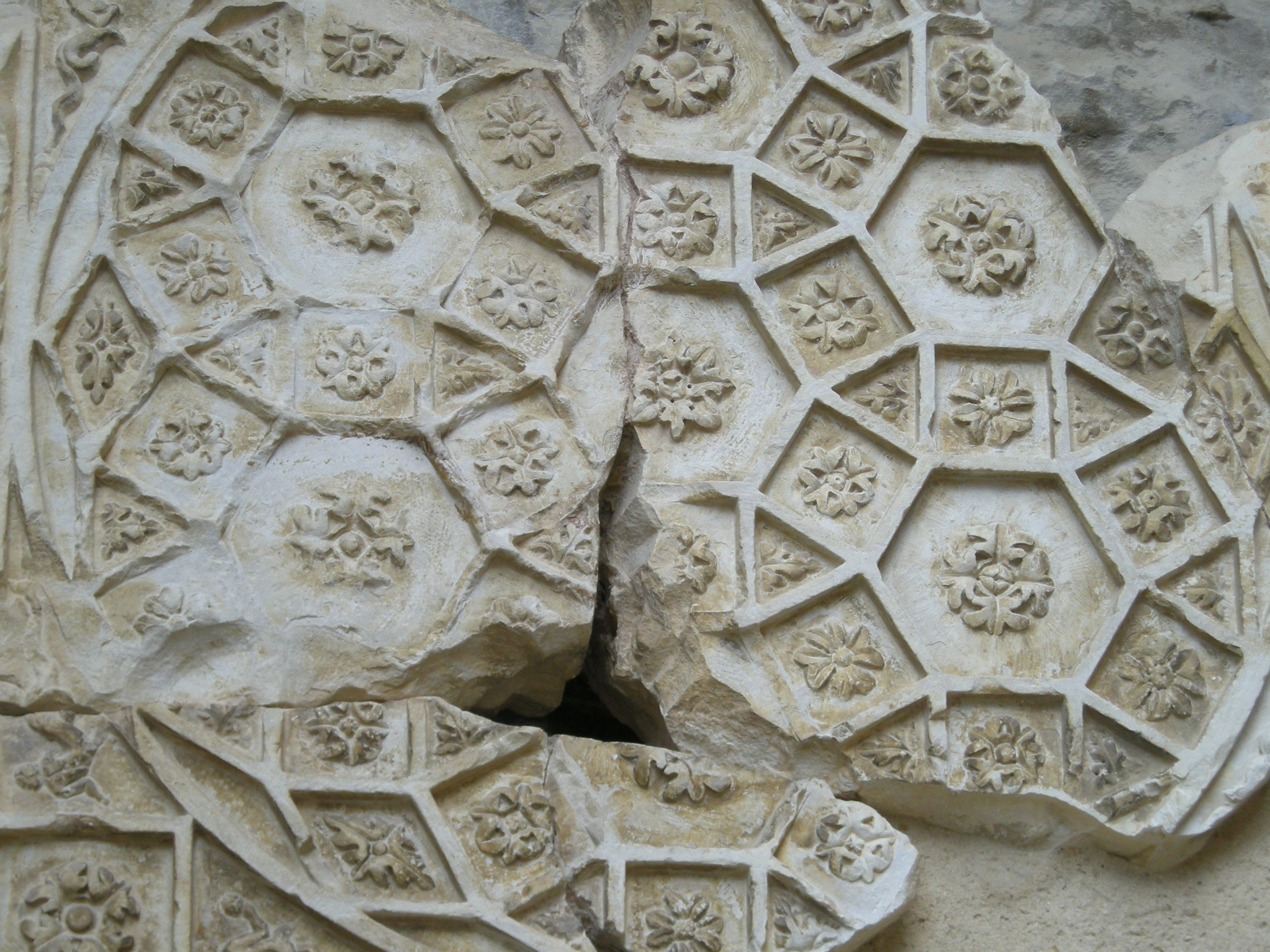
Coffered vaulted ceiling

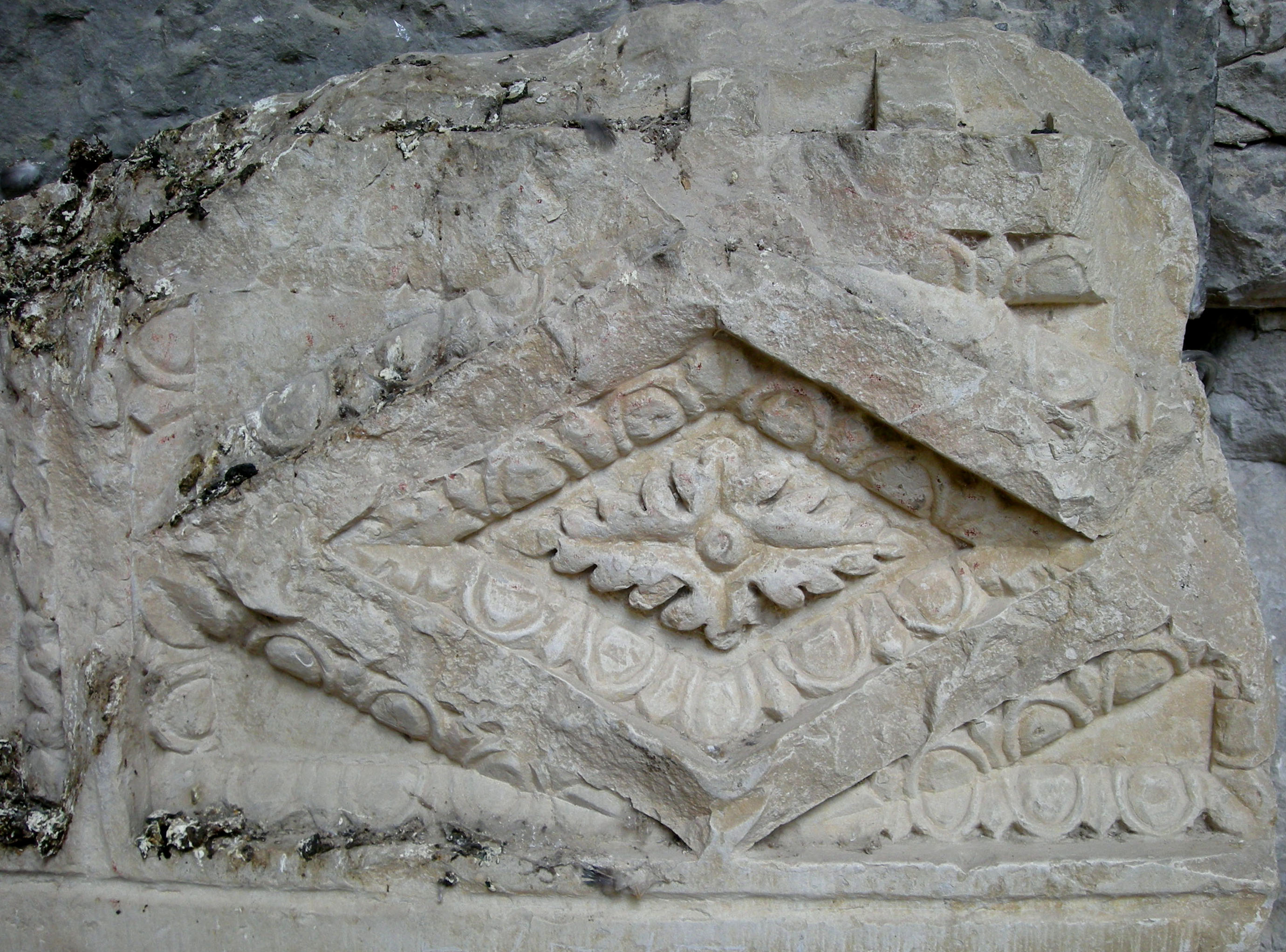
Coffered vaulted ceiling

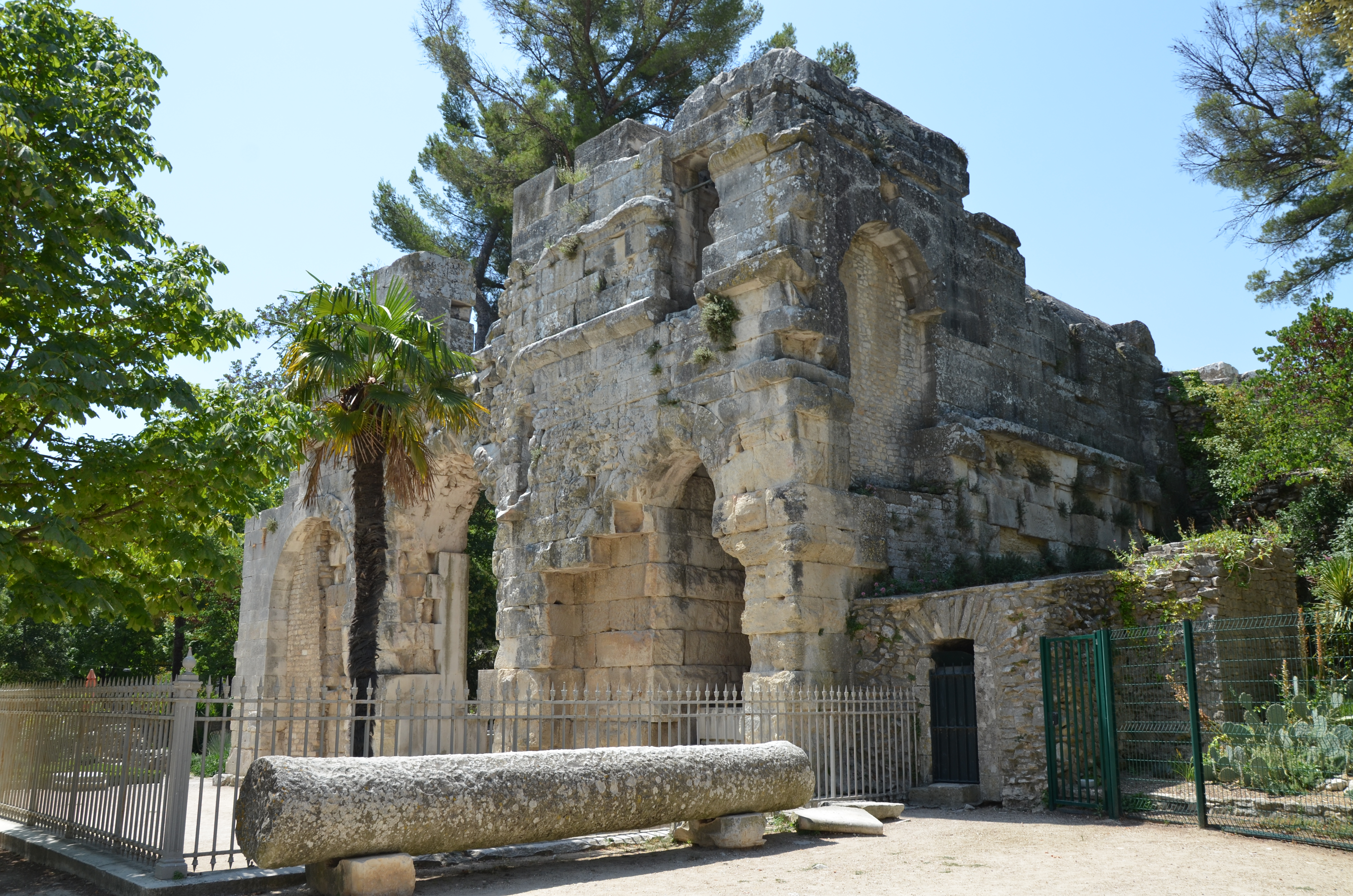

== Related articles ==
- Maurice-Mollard Plaza

== Bibliography (in French) ==
- René Barjavel, « Au festival de Nîmes, Les Mouches se posent sur le temple de Diane », dans Paris-Presse-l'Intransigeant, 9-10 juillet 1950
- Jules Canonge, Térentia, ou Le temple de Diane et les bains romains de Nîmes sous les empereurs, Giraud, 1843, 36 p.
- Dominique Darde, Nîmes antique, Paris, Monum, Éditions du patrimoine, coll. « Guides archéologiques de la France », 1er mars 2005 (réimpr. 2006), 128 p., broché avec rabats (ISBN 2-85822-797-7)
- François Durand, Les monuments antiques de Nîmes, Jo Fabre, 1925, p. 151
- M. Ménard, Histoire des Antiquités de la ville de Nismes et de ses environs, Nismes, 1838 (7e éd.), p. 72-81
- Jules Teissier-Rolland, Des bains et thermes chez les anciens, des bains romains de Nîmes et du Temple-de-Diane, Ballivet et Fabre, 1850, 262 p.
