= Seyssel family =

Ancient French family

de Seyssel
- Country: Duchy of Savoy: France; Italy
- Founded: 1235
- Titles: Marquis d'Aix, and others
- Motto: Franc et Léal (Frank and loyal)
- Estates: Aix, Beyrin, Bourdeau, Buisson, Chambuet, Châtelard, Châtillon, Choisel, Le Clos, Fistillieu, La Martinière, Malet, les Plantées, Saint-Bois, Saint-Cassin, Sainte-Hélène-des-Millières, Villaret.
- Dissolution: 1660

Seyssel is an ancient French family which is first mentioned in Savoy in the thirteenth century and probably dates back some time earlier. The name derives from city of Seyssel, and the family's various branches held the titles of viscounts, earls, barons and marquises over the course of time. Its members were positioned in the first rank at the court of the Counts of Savoy and the bishops of Geneva. Today there are branches of the Seyssel in Italy, Bavaria, Austria and France.

== History ==
=== Origins ===
In a history of the Seyssel family, Count Marc de Seyssel-Cressieu (1861–1922) considers it quite possible that the family is related to an early lord of Aix-les-Bains Gauthier d'Aix (Galterius de Aquis) who in 1097 was a witness to a donation made by Humbert II, Count of Savoy to the priory of Bourget. However other Savoy historians question this link maintaining that the Aix title was in the gift of the crown, a view supported by the authors of Histoire des communes savoyardes.

Some writers suggest that it may have been a cadet branch of the House of Savoy.

The (probable) origin of this family goes back to Humbert (II) of Seyssel, a knight mentioned in 1246 as Lord of Aix and Bourdeau, Count of Novalaise, who paid homage, in 1263, for the domain of Bourdeau. He is a witness to numerous deeds published between 1236 and 1274, notably when the contract of marriage of Amadeus IV was signed in 1244. His brother Gautier is linked in certain documents). It becomes more rigorous with another Humbert de Seyssel, lord of Aix, mentioned in 1330.

=== A powerful regional family ===
The title Count of Novalaise indicates an inferior rank to the Humbertians (the future House of Savoy) and the great regional lords. They held rights over the region of Yenne and probably part of the Savoyard lowlands from the Rhone to Lac d'Aiguebelette in Savoie-Propre, the base of the future County of Savoy. Originally from Seyssel, whose name they bear, they appear to have exchanged it with Aix, an ancient city where the kings of Burgundy owned a residence. This move is considered by historians to have been between 1070 and 1200. The historian Bernard Demotz has promoted the thought that the family may have been related to the early Humbertians, given their location both in Savoie-Propre and neighbouring Bugey.

Their control the region was through the construction of castles or buildings to control access to the city of Chambéry, including their strongholds of Aix (at the edge of Lake Bourget), la Bâtie (parish of Barby near Chambéry), Saint-Cassin (also near Chambéry), Aiguebelette (Avant-Pays Savoyard) or Bourdeau (on the banks of Lake Bourget).

Their local strength allowed them to join the entourage of the Counts of Savoy and to join the count's council.

In 1454 the last member of the House of La Chambre died and their titles and possessions passed to Amédée (or Aymon), son of Marguerite de La Chambre and Jean de Seyssel, Marshal of Savoy, and who joined the Seyssel name with La Chambre. Louis, Duke of Savoy elevated the rank of Seyssel-La Chambre to an earldom on August 1456, and the earldom became a marquisate in 1564.

The senior branch of Seyssel, lords of Aix, disappeared in 1509 and their titles and possessions also passed to the Seyssel-La Chambre branch. Françoise de Seyssel-La Chambre was the heiress of her husband Gabriel de Seyssel, her son having died. She appointed as her sole heir her godson Charles de Seyssel-La Chambre, "on the express condition that he relinquishes the name and arms of La Chambre and take the name and arms of Seyssel, and that neither he nor his heirs would separate the four baronies of Aix, La Bâtie, Châtillon and Maillonnaz".

In the next century, following the extinction of this second branch in 1660 and additionally a lawsuit, the marquisate of Aix passed to the junior branch holders of the marquisate of Serraz (1687). It also obtained the marquisate of Sommariva del Bosco during the same period.

== Titles and Offices ==
The house of Seyssel possessed domains located mainly in the Savoyard state, including the provinces of Savoy Propre, Genevois, Maurienne, Bresse, Bugey and Piedmont, but also the Dauphiné.

Non-exhaustive list of the titles borne by the Seyssel family at various times:

- Vicounts of Maurienne (inherited from La Chambre), of Novalaise (mentioned in an act of 1209), and of Choisel;
- Marquis of Aix (1575), of La Chambre (1564), of Châtillon, of Meximieux, of La Serraz (1654), of Sommariva;
- Counts of Seyssel-La Balme (1744), of Cevins, of Dammartin, of Hueille, of La Chambre (1456), of Montfort, of Montreal, of Seyssel, of the Holy Empire, of the French Empire;
- Barons of Aix (after 1509), Bourdeau, Bâtie-Seyssel, Bourg-Saint-Christophe, Châtellard-en-Bauge, Châtillon-en-Chautagne, Cueille, Cuines, Hurtières, Meximieux (by marriage, around 1530–17), Pontamafrey, Ruffey, Saint Helena des Millières, Saint-Rémy, Sermoye, Serra, Theys (in Dauphiné), and of Villars;
- Lords of Aiguebelette, Aix (1235) with all judicial authority, the fish in Lake Bourget, Albigny, Ambilly, Artemare, Barjact, Beauretour, Bessinge, Beyrin, Blonay, Bourdeau, Buisson, Chambuet, Chamoux, Charniaz, Chateau-Neuf, Chatelard, Chatelard-en-Semine, Chatillon, Chemin, Chignin, Choisel, Cloz or Clos (Yenne), Compois, Contrevoz, Cressieu, Dragonnière, Fistillieu, Genost, Granges, Jambol, La Balme, La Martinière, Malet, Marcellaz, Meyrieux, Montbressieu, Munet, Mussel, Novalaise, Pas, Plantées, Puygauthier, La Rochette, Saint-Cassin, la Sauce (fortified house), Tresserve, Vacheresse, Virieu (Virieu-le-Grand) (1438–1440), Saint-Germain-les-Paroisses, Saint-Helene-des-Millières, Saint-Hippolyte-sur-Aix, Saint-Sigismond (now attached to Aix), Sothonod, Tour de Arbigno, Tour de Chavornay, Tivolière, Tour-de-Lugrin, Traize, Villard, Villaret (Meyrieux-Trouet* ), Villeneuve and Truchères;
- Joint lords of Buffavent, and of Thorens.
