= History of Aix-les-Bains =

Historical aspects of Aix-les-Bains

The coat of arms of Aix-les-Bains is described as gules, a golden star in chief (red field with a gold star positioned at the top). It was designed by Guido Gonin in the late 19th century. Prior to the French Revolution, the town had not been granted a charter of franchises and thus lacked an official coat of arms. The Château d’Aix, however, bears the coat of arms of the de Seyssel family, reflecting their historical association with the area. Since 1992, Aix-les-Bains has also used a municipal logo, which appears in promotional materials from economic partners, including Aix water and the tourist office.

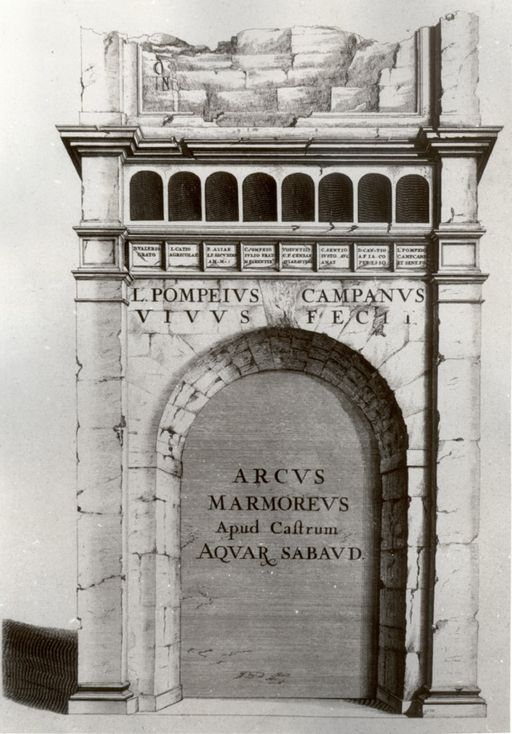
The Arch of Campanus, Borgonio, 1674.

The history of Aix-les-Bains, closely tied to Lac du Bourget and its thermal springs, reflects its emergence as a prominent spa destination, a trajectory best understood within the broader context of Savoy’s cultural and historical evolution.

== Chronological history ==
=== The origins ===
During the Neolithic period (approximately 5000 to 2500 BC), sedentary communities established settlements along the shores of Lac du Bourget. Underwater archaeological excavations have identified evidence of lake-dwelling sites, often referred to as "lake cities". At least two of these lie near the Aix-les-Bains shoreline, specifically in the areas of Grand Port and Baie de Mémars. These remains, recognized for their historical significance, earned a place on the UNESCO World Heritage Site in 2011.

Following these early settlements, the region’s importance endured, as traces of Celtic life emerged near the thermal springs in the town center, notably an inscription honoring the spring deity Borvo.

=== Aquae: Roman Aix ===
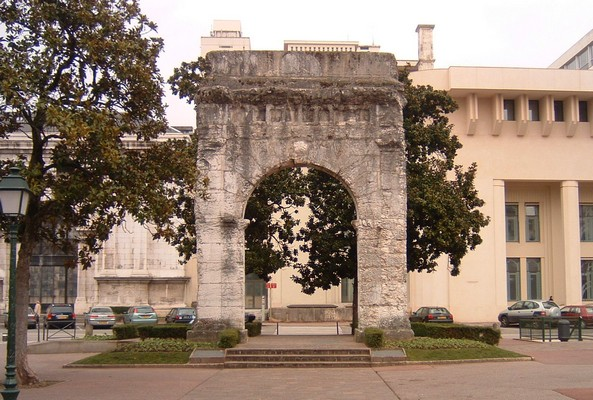
Arch of Campanus

Historians widely attribute the origins of Aix-les-Bains (hereafter Aix) to its thermal springs, which spurred Roman development atop an earlier Celtic settlement. Archaeologist Alain Canal dates the site’s initial occupation to the 1st century BC. However, no evidence confirms that these early traces represent a permanent settlement. The surviving archaeological remains, consisting mainly of public structures, make reconstructing the layout of ancient Aquae challenging. Epigraphic records from the 1st century AD indicate that Aix functioned as a vicus, administered by a council of ten members known as decemlecti, and was part of the territory governed by the city of Vienne.

Excavations have revealed a significant spa complex adjacent to the thermal springs. On a lower western terrace, the funerary arch of Campanus, likely constructed in the 1st century AD, has been identified. Further downstream, a second terrace supports the Temple of Diana, which replaced an earlier circular structure in the 2nd century AD, possibly contemporaneous with the arch. To the north of the temple, remains of necropolises have been uncovered. The Parc des Thermes and other scattered locations in the city contain various artifacts, including pottery and additional necropolis fragments. Despite these findings, no single discovery has prompted extensive further excavation. Consequently, details about the Gallo-Roman vicus of Aquae—such as its extent, urban layout, and daily activities—remain limited. The locations of Roman residences, agricultural estates, and associated settlements, as well as the vicus’s specific functions, are not well-documented. Current understanding relies heavily on the archaeological map compiled by the Regional Directorate of Cultural Affairs (DRAC).

In summary, Aquae’s history began with a 1st-century BC occupation, expanding through the 1st and 2nd centuries AD as the spa complex and terraced monuments took shape. The thermal springs drove this growth, though its strategic location likely played a role too.

=== From the Middle Ages to the Renaissance ===
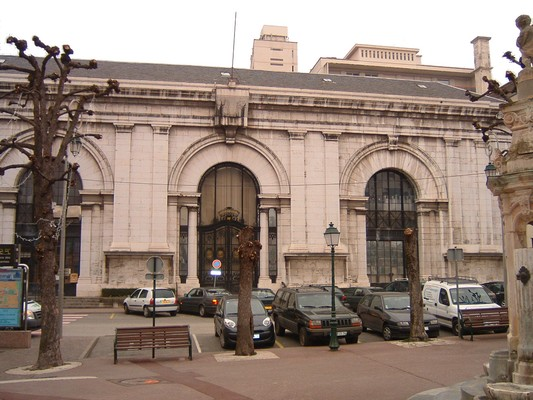
Roman baths.

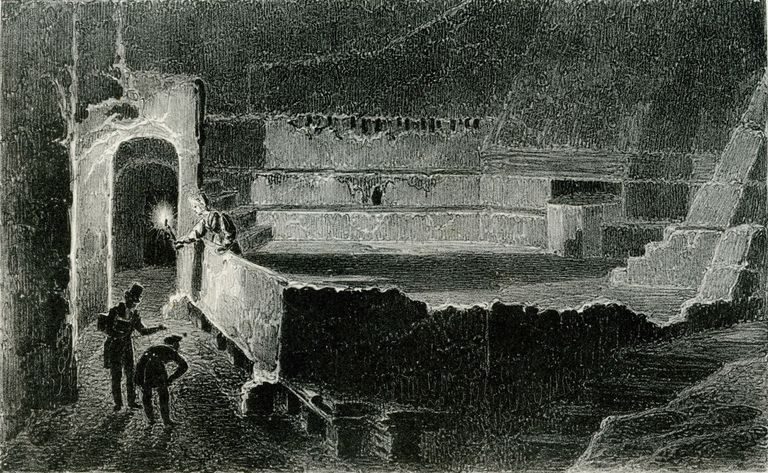
Discovery of Roman baths under the Perrier pension, early 19th century.

Knowledge of Aix-les-Bains’ history, primarily focused on the Roman period, becomes increasingly uncertain due to the lack of sources from the late Roman Empire and early Middle Ages. Evidence of destruction from barbarian invasions, including fire traces on Gallo-Roman villas near Arbin, provides some basis for understanding this period, though details remain speculative. The Roman thermal baths in Aix-les-Bains fell into disrepair from the 5th century onward, and evidence of urban structures largely disappeared.

Aix reappears in written records in the 9th century, with mentions in charters from 867 and 1011. In the latter, King Rudolf III of Burgundy granted the villa of Aix—described as a royal residence with settlers and slaves—to his wife Ermengarde, who subsequently transferred it to the bishopric of Grenoble. This charter indicates that Aix was a settlement with a church and agricultural lands. In the early 12th century, Bishop Hugh of Grenoble donated the land to the Saint-Martin de Miséréré monastery, which established the church as a priory under Sainte-Marie’s patronage. By the late 12th century, the cartulary of Saint Hugh records two additional parishes: Saint-Simond, with its own parish church, and Saint-Hippolyte (now a Mouxy suburb), home to a small priory. During this period, Aix’s urban form took shape, enclosed within ramparts of unknown construction date. The priory, rising near the former Roman temple’s site, likely anchored the town and may have served as an administrative hub, a role that expanded under the de Seyssel family's seigneurie from the 13th century. They maintained a castle, its precise location uncertain but possibly the site of the current structure. Two hamlets are documented: Saint-Hippolyte, situated just outside the town’s ramparts, and Saint-Simond (also known as Saint-Sigismond). The nearby Hautecombe Abbey held a significant estate in the upper Saint-Simond area.

The Roman Empire at its peak.

Textual evidence suggests the existence of additional villages, although no confirmed records appear until 1561, when a population count was taken for the salt tax. At that time, Aix had 1,095 inhabitants, with 46% residing in the town itself. Saint-Simond had 125 residents, Puer 91, Choudy 87, Lafin 86, and the remaining population was distributed among approximately ten smaller hamlets, with Marlioz absent from the records. This settlement pattern appears to have persisted largely unchanged until the late 19th century.

In the early 16th century, the church of Sainte-Marie was destroyed by fire. Reconstruction efforts were supported by Claude de Seyssel, a member of the local noble family, who served as Bishop of Albi and a key advisor to King Louis XII of France, in addition to authoring several legal treatises. His family oversaw a collegiate church with twelve canons under a count-appointed dean. Built on a square beside the cemetery, it featured a flamboyant Gothic choir for the chapter and a simpler nave for parishioners. The nave’s vault collapsed in 1644 due to structural flaws, while a side chapel housed de Seyssel burials. After the French Revolution, the collegiate church became a parish church and was demolished in 1909 following the construction of a new church. It housed a relic of the True Cross, attracting pilgrims from a wide region. Also at the end of the Middle Ages, the seigneurial castle of Aix was reconstructed. The ceiling of the main hall on the ground floor is dated to 1400, and the grand staircase was added around 1590.

=== The 18th century, the Victor Amédée III thermal baths, the Revolution ===
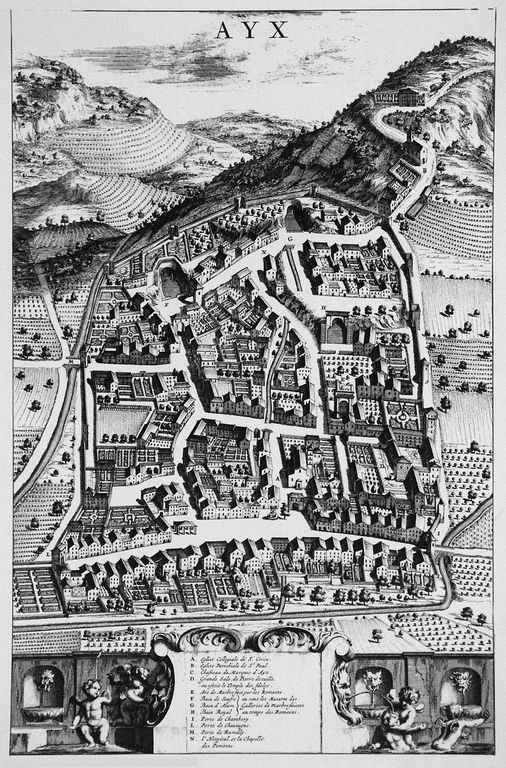
Aix in 1674, after Borgonio, Theatrum Sabaudiæ.

On April 9, 1739, a fire broke out in the town center of Aix-les-Bains, destroying 80 houses—approximately half of the settlement. To facilitate rebuilding, the town requested subsidies from the king, who approved funding contingent on an alignment plan designed by engineer Garella. This plan extended beyond mere reconstruction, introducing a structured street layout and urban regulations, including requirements for two-story houses with a ground floor and a ban on thatched roofs. Its application was confined to the affected area—primarily rue Albert Ier, Place Carnot, and rue des Bains—and remained in effect until 1808. Implementation was inconsistent, however, as local authorities lacked funds to purchase properties for demolition, and owners were restricted from renovations until full rebuilding became necessary.

Awareness of the thermal springs in Aix-les-Bains grew in the early 17th century, following the writings of Dauphiné physician Jean Baptiste Cabias and later works by other medical professionals. These springs had been used since antiquity, continuing through the Middle Ages and into the late 18th century. Residents bathed either in the last remaining Roman open-air pool or in private homes, where thermal water was delivered by porters. Cabias also mentioned that King Henri IV of France took a bath associated with Aix, although the location is often cited as Aix-en-Provence instead of Aix-les-Bains. In 1737, the Intendance Générale initiated a significant project to protect the thermal waters from contamination by a stream crossing the town. This required digging a new channel for the Ruisseau des Moulins outside the ramparts and altering the central urban layout. The four mills owned by the Marquis d’Aix, previously situated in the town center, were relocated along this new canal, now known as Montée des Moulins.

Aix’s revival accelerated under the Duke of Chablais, son of King Victor-Amédée III. Finding the springs beneficial but lodging lacking, he proposed a spa facility. On June 11, 1776, Victor-Amédée III decreed its construction, designed by Comte de Robilant and built from 1779 to 1783 under engineer Capellini. This project coincided with the initial demolition of parts of the old town center, as surrounding areas were cleared to create a public square.

The spa establishment contributed significantly to the town’s growth. From its completion until the French Revolution, Aix-les-Bains hosted approximately 600 spa visitors annually, a stable figure, with most originating from France. The population subsequently increased, reaching 1,700 by 1793. In 1783, the Commune Council commissioned a landscaped public promenade, known as the Gigot (now Square Alfred-Boucher), to enhance the experience of spa-goers. Designed by architect Louis Lampro and lined with chestnut trees, it marked the town’s first public urban green space initiative, aside from private gardens. This development spurred expansion along the Route de Genève, beyond the ramparts.

In 1792, French revolutionary troops under the command of Montesquiou entered Savoy. Spa activities declined during this period, and the thermes were requisitioned by the Republic to house convalescing soldiers, inadvertently raising the town’s profile among a broader audience. Adopting the name Aix-les-Bains, the town shed noble privileges, erasing a debt to the Marquis d’Aix for seigneurial rights due to its lack of a franchise charter. Free trade post-conflict revived the thermal economy, fostering guesthouses, hotels, and cabarets, though the collegiate church suffered abandonment and partial destruction.

Near the lake, the small harbor mole at Puer, constructed in 1720 under the Ancien Régime, evolved into a functional port. Initially utilized by boats supplying the Armée des Alpes, complete with a military storehouse, it was later adapted for exporting goods, including glassware produced in lakeside workshops. Renamed the Port de Puer, its development prompted improvements to the Avenue du Lac, encouraging the construction of aligned buildings along this route outside the town center and existing villages. The revolutionary period may have influenced village development through the division of former noble estates and the loss of church properties, though detailed studies on land ownership changes remain limited. Around village peripheries, new pre-industrial activities emerged, including mills, sawmills, and hydraulic forges.

=== The French Revolution ===
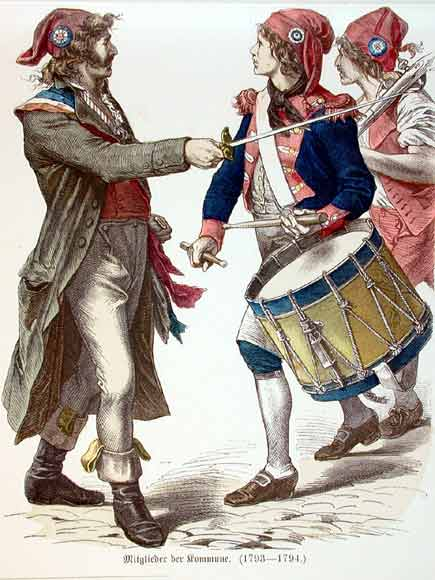
Sans-culottes

By the late 18th century, revolutionary ideas had circulated among segments of the bourgeoisie, artisans, and working classes in Aix-les-Bains, influenced by Savoyards residing in Paris and the writings of Genevan philosophers Voltaire and Jean-Jacques Rousseau. On the night of September 21–22, 1792, French troops under General Montesquiou crossed the border, launching a surprise invasion of the Duchy of Savoy. This action prompted the Savoyard army, King Victor-Amédée III, and numerous civil servants and clergy to seek refuge in Piedmont. In late October, the Allobroges Assembly convened in Chambéry Cathedral, proclaiming the end of absolutist rule, the abolition of corvées and the gabelle (salt tax), the dissolution of the militia, and the establishment of the Mont-Blanc department, encompassing the six Savoyard provinces. As a result, the residents of Aix-les-Bains became French citizens for the next 23 years.

The initial response to the French troops in Aix-les-Bains was generally positive, following the Duke of Savoy's departure. However, subsequent measures—including widespread conscription, the exodus of nobility and clergy to Piedmont, and the Revolution’s anticlerical policies—led to growing discontent among the Savoyard population, culminating in local uprisings. Aix-les-Bains remained under French control until the collapse of the Napoleonic Empire in 1815, after which the House of Savoy regained possession of the region. During this period, Anne-Marie Claudine Bédat, Baroness Brunet de Saint-Jean-d’Arves through her marriage to Noël Brunet, owned the Château d’Aix-les-Bains, now the Hôtel de Ville (town hall). She sold the property to the Marquis de Seyssel in 1821.

=== The Second Empire ===
Aix-les-Bains became permanently French on April 22, 1860, following the Treaty of Turin, which formalized the annexation of Savoy to France. A local plebiscite recorded 1,090 votes in favor and 13 against the union. This transition was marked by an official visit from Napoleon III on August 29, 1860, during which he inspected the Aix spa amid public celebrations, including decorations and crowds.

=== The Belle Époque (1890–1914) ===
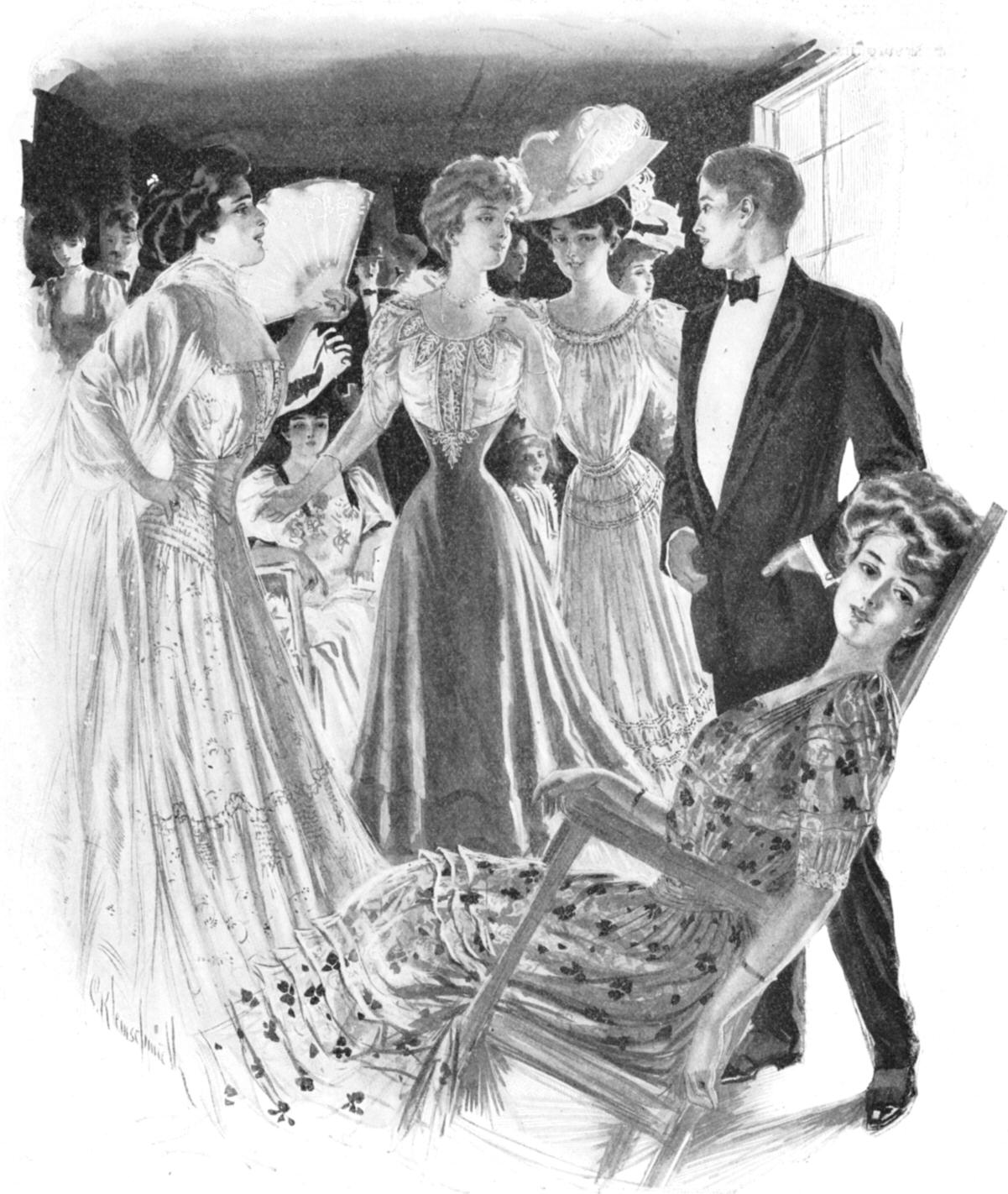

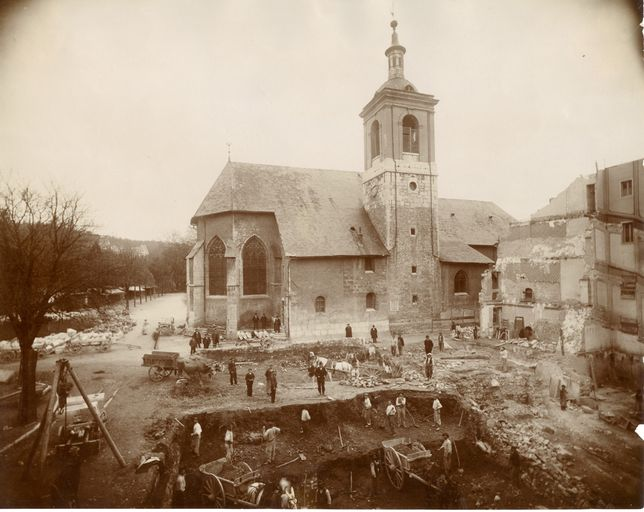
Founding of the Hôtel-palace Astoria in Aix-les-Bains.

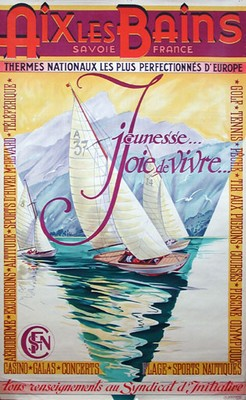

Aix-les-Bains emerged as a prominent destination during the Belle Époque, attracting princely families and affluent visitors through the 1960s. This period is reflected in the numerous palaces that overlook the town, many of which have since been converted into condominiums. Notable figures such as Queen Victoria—who frequented establishments like the Café des Bains and the Grand Cercle—King Albert I of Belgium, and the Aga Khan were regular visitors, drawn not only by the thermal waters but also by the town’s entertainment offerings. Their presence contributed to the establishment of a golf course, a tennis club, and a racecourse. The town also served as a setting for several works by Sacha Guitry, including Confessions of a Cheat (Les Mémoires d’un tricheur).

Queen Victoria visited Aix-les-Bains frequently, traveling discreetly under the title Countess of Balmoral due to her status and diplomatic considerations. She appreciated the town’s waters, climate, and surroundings, leading her to plan a residence on the Tresserve hill in 1888. Despite approval, the project was not realized. During this era, Aix-les-Bains offered a vibrant social environment that appealed to both influential figures and artists, providing a distinctive setting for creative inspiration.

Among those inspired was Alphonse de Lamartine, who arrived in Aix-les-Bains on October 1, 1816. In his writings, he referred to the town as “Aix-en-Savoie" and described staying at a hillside boarding house. A prominent figure in the Romantic movement, Lamartine recounted rescuing Julie Charles, a fellow resident suffering from tuberculosis, from drowning during a crossing of the lake to Hautecombe. This event led to a brief romantic relationship.

Aix-les-Bains experienced notable seasonal variation, with quiet winters giving way to vibrant summers filled with events and gatherings. Throughout the 19th and early 20th centuries, the town attracted European aristocrats and socialites during the summer months. Guy de Maupassant encountered the historian-philosopher Hippolyte Taine in Aix-les-Bains, an interaction noted in his writings. Prince Nicholas of Greece, connected to various European royal families, spent summers in Aix-les-Bains and Denmark, where he was known as “Greek Nicky” to distinguish him from his cousin, the future Tsar Nicholas II of Russia.

=== The First World War ===
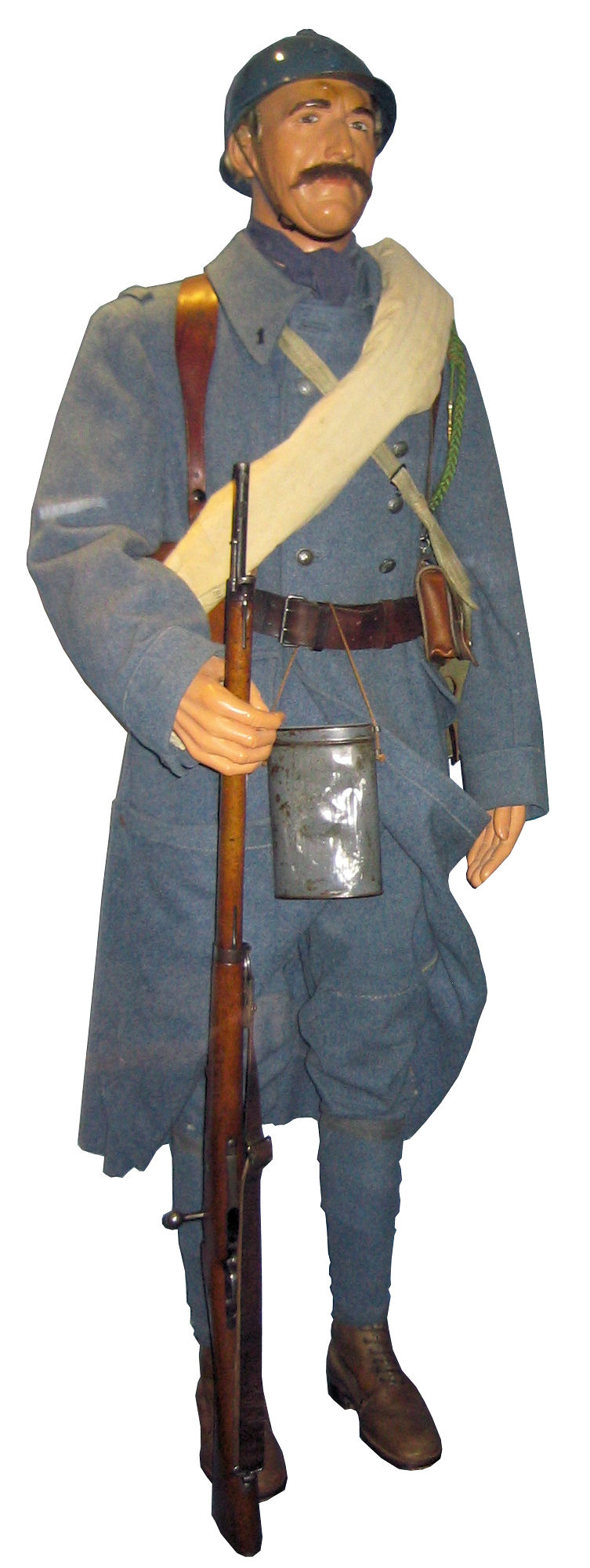
French soldier in the 1914-1918 war.

Although the First World War officially began in 1914, preparations had been underway for years prior. In 1901, 45 beds were reserved at the Hospice Thermal (Reine Hortense) in Aix-les-Bains, designated for military use upon the declaration of war. In coordination with the Aix-les-Bains municipality, the Ministry of War planned to establish two auxiliary hospitals in the town following the outbreak of hostilities. The first was set up in 1911 at the Bernascon High School on Boulevard des Anglais, and the second followed in 1913 at the Girls’ High School at 2 Rue Lamartine.

On August 5, 1914, the president of the Union des Femmes announced that her hospital, located in the Upper Elementary School, was prepared to receive wounded soldiers. On August 8, the Société de Secours aux Blessés Militaires publicly confirmed the opening of the auxiliary hospital at Bernascon High School, effective August 10. On August 14, the prefecture instructed the Aix-les-Bains municipality to transfer any wounded individuals who could be treated elsewhere, thereby freeing space for military casualties. On August 28, the casino administration provided the Grand Cercle and Villa des Fleurs to the municipal coordination committee.

On August 28, the Savoie prefecture received a message from the military governor of the 14th Region requesting a delay in organizing hospital facilities for wounded soldiers in the neutralized Savoie zone due to diplomatic considerations. Three days later, on August 31, a subsequent dispatch indicated that admitting wounded soldiers, including Germans, to Aix-les-Bains—part of the neutralized zone—required ministerial approval and could not proceed without it. These directives prohibited the admission of wounded soldiers in Haute-Savoie and the portion of Savoie designated as a neutralized zone under the 1815 Treaty of Paris, which included Aix-les-Bains.

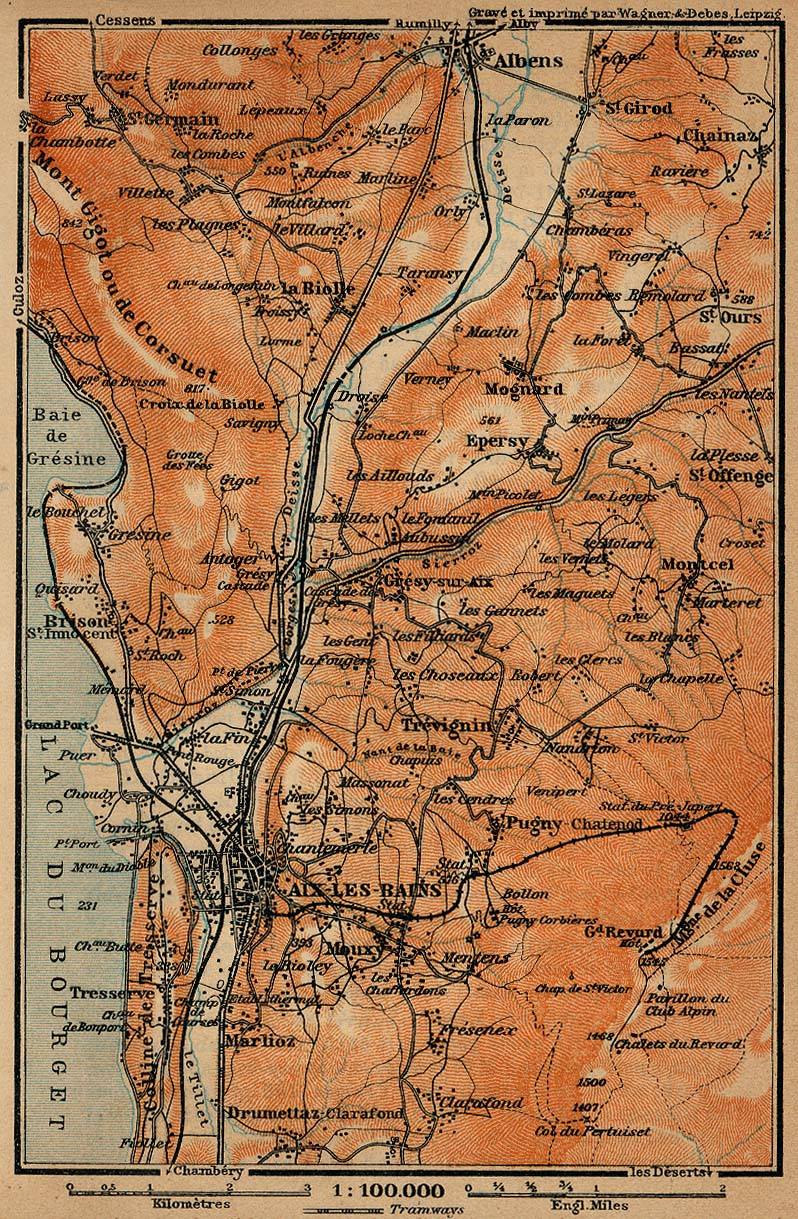
Map of the town in 1914.

On September 2, 1914, the Savoie prefecture recorded a telephone conversation with the Ministry of Foreign Affairs, which stated: “The Minister of Foreign Affairs declares that French wounded capable of returning to military service must not be placed in Aix-les-Bains. However, there appears to be no objection to placing French or German wounded who are severely injured, whose lives are at risk, or who are not expected to recover before the end of hostilities in a neutral zone". On September 4, the ministry sent a telegram to the prefecture, asserting: “Based on the French interpretation of treaties, Aix-les-Bains is considered outside the neutral zone; therefore, there is no impediment to hospitalizing wounded individuals there".

This reclassification excluded Aix-les-Bains from the neutral zone established under the 1815 Treaty of Paris, a status tied to Savoy’s historical annexation to France, Haute-Savoie remained within it. Consequently, Red Cross committees from Haute-Savoie—including those in Annecy, Annemasse, and Evian—relocated their operations to Aix-les-Bains in the neighboring Savoie département. By September 1914, the health service in Aix-les-Bains had access to 1,135 beds for medical use.

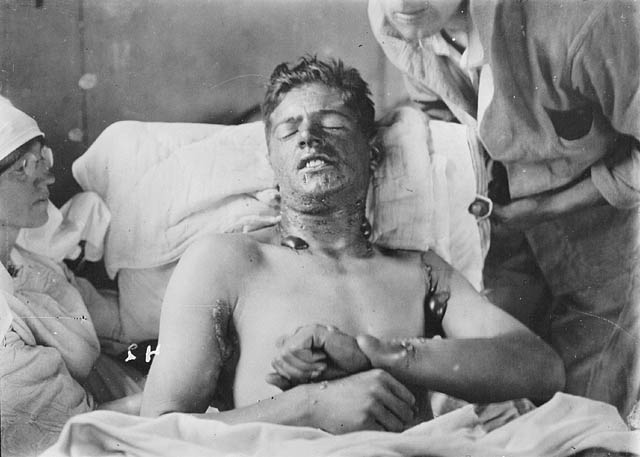
A wounded man with mustard gas.

On September 10, 1914, a train transported 330 wounded soldiers to Aix-les-Bains. On the night of September 12–13, an additional 85 wounded arrived. On September 13, the Grand Cercle ambulance established 200 extra beds in the games room and the café and theater halls. Two operating theaters were set up in a small room adjacent to the bridge room and the northwest gallery. By October 1, 1914, the town had received 1,180 wounded soldiers, distributed across 14 care units. During September, six new hospital units were established in major palace hotels: the Beau-Site, Régina-Bernascon, Grand-Hôtel d’Aix, Continental du Nord, and Mercédès.

At the Aix-les-Bains town council meeting on October 5, 1914, three requests were submitted: first, to recall mobilized local doctors; second, to request that the health service send only lightly wounded soldiers, as surgical staff were limited and operating theaters—beyond the one at the Hôpital Municipal—were inadequately equipped for serious cases; and third, to explore alternatives to transporting wounded in cattle cars.

By spring 1915, despite the ongoing war, civilian life in Aix-les-Bains began to stabilize. In late May, the mayor formally requested the authorities to release the Grand Cercle, which had been functioning as a convalescent hospital since the war’s outset. The mayor stated: “As Savoie reopens, it is necessary to provide visitors and bathers with adequate facilities.” Following review, the evacuation of the Grand Cercle began on November 12, 1915, and concluded on January 15, 1916. In 1917, several hotels were also vacated, enabling the town to accommodate spa guests once more.

=== Between the wars ===
Between the wars, Aix-les-Bains played a subtle yet varied role, from supplying materials to hosting high-profile unions. Construction of Lyon’s Sacré-Cœur church began in 1922 with its foundation stone laid. To cut costs, planners swapped ashlar masonry for white reconstituted stone from Aix’s Boschetto Company. On December 7, 1929, Aga Khan III married Andrée Joséphine Carron (1898–1976) in a civil ceremony in Aix-les-Bains, followed by a religious ceremony on December 13, 1929, in Bombay (India). Carron, the daughter of an artisan butcher, had worked as a candy store saleswoman and later co-owned a hat shop. Following the marriage, she became known as Princess Andrée Aga Khan. Their son, Prince Sadruddin Aga Khan, was born in 1933.

=== The Second World War ===
On January 31, 1942, Laure Mutschler married Eugène Diebold in Lyon, where they had relocated. In July 1942, the couple, both resistance members, were arrested but released due to insufficient evidence. They subsequently moved to Aix-les-Bains, where Laure Diebold adopted the codename “Mona” and went into hiding. She joined the Free French Forces, serving as Jean Moulin's secretary until her arrest and deportation.

== Thematic history ==
=== Toponymy ===
Aix-les-Bains, established as a settlement in the 1st century AD, appears infrequently in ancient epigraphic records and is absent from the works of prominent Roman authors. Two inscriptions, housed in the local archaeological museum, mention Aquae (“the Waters”) and Aquensis (“inhabitants of the place of the Waters”), offering evidence of this vicus, which was administratively linked to the city of Vienne. Nineteenth-century historians associated these terms with the modern name Aix-les-Bains.

The inscriptions include variations such as Aquae Allobrogium, Aquae Gratianae (noted on the pediment of the Thermes Nationaux from 1934 to 1968), and Allobrogum Aquae Gratianae. In 1011, a charter from King Rudolph III of Burgundy granting the royal estate of Aix (de Aquis) to his wife Ermengarde uses the name Aquae. Medieval texts also record Aquae Grationapolis, reflecting the settlement’s connection to the Diocese of Grenoble. The earliest known use of “Aix-les-Bains” appears in a September 1792 letter by a French soldier convalescing at the thermal springs, with the name later appearing in official records, including town council minutes. In the early 19th century, some literary works referred to the town as “Aix-en-Savoie,” though this form was not adopted administratively. Since 1954, following a town council request, the local train station has been designated “Aix-les-Bains – Le Revard".

Thermal baths

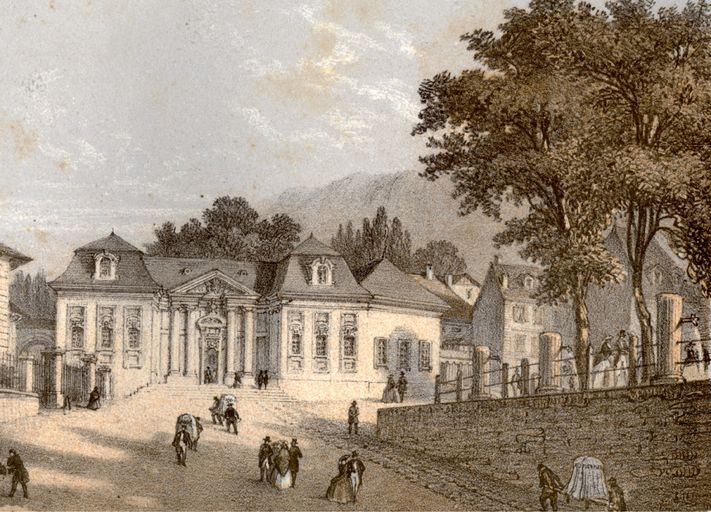
The Victor Amédée III thermal baths in Aix-les-Bains.

By 1806, the number of visitors to Aix-les-Bains had reached 800 annually, matching levels seen prior to the French Revolution. This figure increased to 1,200 by 1809 and approached 1,800 three years later, in 1812. Following the Restoration in 1815, visitor numbers continued to grow. By 1848, Aix-les-Bains recorded 4,800 visitors per year, a figure six times higher than that of Évian and Saint-Gervais, and sixteen times higher than La Caille and Brides.

Architect Pierre Izac contributed to the construction of a thermal bath facility in Aix-les-Bains during this period. 1933, ceramists Gentil & Bourdet completed several works at the Thermes Nationaux d’Aix-les-Bains (Pétriaux), among their notable projects.

=== Negotiations for Moroccan independence ===
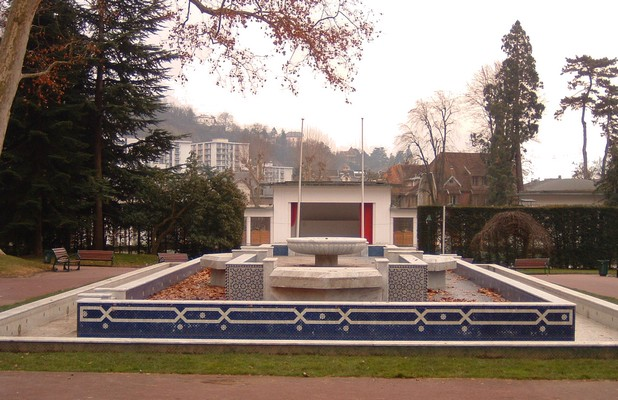
Tribute fountain, commemorating negotiations for Moroccan independence, in the Aix-les-Bains park.

In September 1955, negotiations for Morocco's independence took place in Aix-les-Bains. During the Aix-les-Bains conference, French Prime Minister Edgar Faure outlined a compromise proposal for Morocco, encapsulated in the phrase “independence in interdependence". At that time, Morocco was a French protectorate, with Mohammed Ben Youssef in exile as sultan. The conference included representatives from both French and Moroccan delegations. The Moroccan side featured members of the Democratic Independence Party (PDI) and the Istiqlal Party, including Mehdi Ben Barka, Omar Benabdejlil, Abderrahim Bouabid, and M'hamed Boucetta. The French delegation included Edgar Faure, Pierre July, Robert Schuman, and other members of the government. Additional participants included representatives from various sectors, invited to provide perspectives on Morocco’s status and its path to independence, as well as traditional Moroccan leaders and figures associated with the protectorate, who were also involved in the discussions. Members of the Istiqlal Party noted that these latter groups were given priority during the talks.

The Aix-les-Bains negotiations marked a significant step toward Moroccan independence. Prior to the conference, France had developed plans for a gradual transition, reflecting its recognition of the need to grant sovereignty to the North African territory while addressing economic ties and relationships with local leaders, such as pashas and caïds. The negotiations concluded with an agreement to establish Morocco as an independent state. Subsequently, Sultan Ben Arafa abdicated, and Mohammed Ben Youssef returned from exile to assume leadership. Morocco’s independence was formally recognized in the Declaration of La Celle-Saint-Cloud on November 6, 1955.

In 2005, the fiftieth anniversary of these negotiations was commemorated. As part of the celebration, a fountain featuring a Moroccan zellige basin was installed in the Parc de Verdure in Aix-les-Bains. The project involved mâalem craftsmen from Fès, Morocco’s spiritual capital, and was supported by the Regional Tourism Council of Fès (CRT-Fès) and the Aix-les-Bains Tourist Office.

=== Transport and communications ===
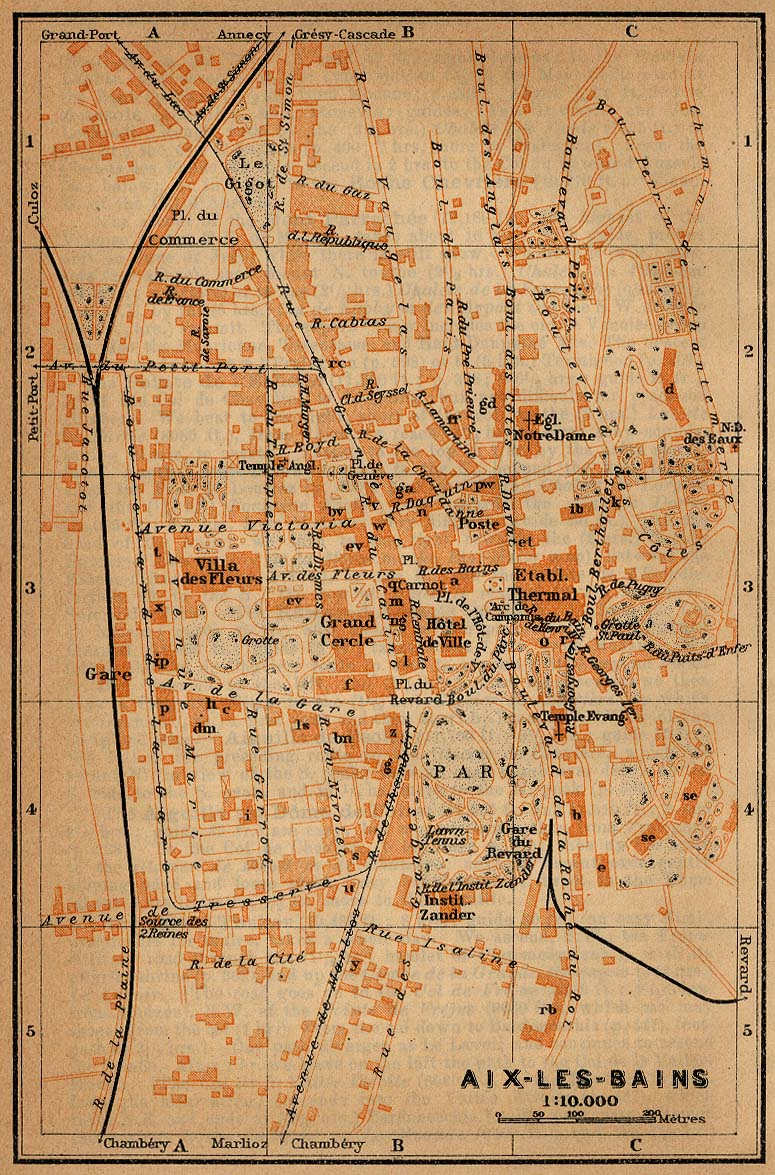
Map of the town in 1914.

The Maurienne line, part of the French rail network, includes two segments connected to Aix-les-Bains: the Aix-les-Bains to Saint-Jean-de-Maurienne line, opened on August 1, 1857, and the Saint-Innocent to Aix-les-Bains line, opened on August 31, 1857. In 1867, the Paris-Lyon-Méditerranée (PLM) company assumed control of the line, except for the Aix-les-Bains to Chambéry section. From 1896, Aix-les-Bains operated the Mékarski compressed-air tramway system.

Between 1950 and 1953, the Ligne de Savoie, running from Aix-les-Bains to La Roche-sur-Foron, utilized electric traction at 20,000 volts and 50 Hz frequency. The Z 9055, a prototype electric railcar developed by SNCF, operated on this line using standard 50 Hz alternating current supplied by EDF, as part of the Étoile de Savoie network, with the initial section being Aix-les-Bains to Annecy.

On July 1, 1950, trials of electric traction using 20 kV at 80 Hz single-phase current began between Aix-les-Bains and La Roche-sur-Foron, marking an early experiment in France. The centenary of the Mont-Revard railroad’s installation was commemorated on August 15, 1992.

=== Sports ===
Aix-les-Bains has hosted multiple stages of the Tour de France, including those in 2001, 1998, 1996, 1991, 1989, 1960, and 1958. The Classique des Alpes, a cycling race established in 1991 and discontinued in 2004 with the introduction of the Pro-Tour, passed through the Chartreuse and Bauges mountain ranges. In 1960, Fernando Manzaneque won the 215 km 18th stage, which ran from Aix-les-Bains to Thonon-les-Bains.

Guy Husson, a French hammer thrower, was a member of AS Aix-les-Bains from 1965 to 1983. He achieved remarkable success, winning the French hammer championship 15 consecutive times from 1954 to 1968. Paul Arpin, a long-distance runner, was affiliated with AS Aix-les-Bains until 1990 and again from 1993 to 1995, securing multiple French championships and a European title in his discipline.

On August 18, 1965, Pancho Gonzales lost the final of the Aix-les-Bains Pro Championships tennis tournament to Alex Olmedo. The final score was 2-6 11-9 6-3. Rodney George "Rod" Laver is a former Australian tennis player. He is the only player to have achieved the Grand Slam twice: in 1962 as an amateur and in 1969 as a professional.

The World 3-Cushion Billiards Championship took place in Aix-les-Bains in 1983, with Raymond Ceulemans (Belgium) winning, followed by Richard Bitalis (France) and Nobuaki Kobayashi (Japan). In 1990, Richard Chelimo won the Junior World Championship title at the World Cross-Country Championships held in Aix-les-Bains.

The same year, Paul Kipkoech won the team gold medal at the World Cross-Country Championships in Aix-les-Bains. On June 22, 2002, Grégory Gabella, a French high jumper and member of AS Aix-les-Bains, won the European Athletics Nations' Cup with a personal best of 2.30m.

In soccer, during the 2006-2007 season, on July 26, the Ligue 1 club Paris Saint-Germain played a friendly match against the Spanish team Celta Vigo to a 1-1 draw.

The French Chess Championship has been held in Aix-les-Bains on several occasions. In 2003, chess player Étienne Bacrot won the championship ahead of Joël Lautier and Andreï Sokolov. In 2007, chess player Maxime Vachier-Lagrave won the championship ahead of Vladislav Tkachiev and Andreï Sokolov.

=== Personalities ===
==== Aix personalities ====
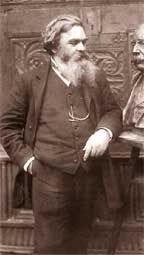
Alfred Boucher.

List of personalities who were born or lived in the town of Aix-les-Bains.

- Gaspard François Forestier (1767–1832) - A French general during the French Revolution and First Empire. He was appointed Commander of the Legion of Honor.
- François Louis Forestier (1776–1814) - A French brigadier general during the French Revolution and First Empire. He was named Baron of the Empire and an Officer of the Legion of Honor.
- Jean Claude Nicolas Forestier (1861–1930) - A landscape architect and urban planner who worked on urban development projects in Paris.
- Jean de Sperati (1884–1957) - A forger recognized for creating counterfeit collector’s stamps. Born in Pisa, Italy, he lived and worked in Aix-les-Bains later in life.
- Aimé Bachelard (1885–1975) - A French magistrate, writer, and poet who used the pseudonym Aimé Sierroz. He concluded his career at the Grenoble Court of Appeal.
- Gabriel-Marie Garrone (1901–1994) - A Catholic Church official who served as Bishop of Chambéry (1955–1966), later becoming Titular Archbishop of Turres in Numidia, and was made a cardinal by Pope Paul VI in 1967.
- Georges Brun (1922–1995) - A rugby union player who represented France as a fullback and played for CS Vienne.
- Robert Bogey (1935–present) - A middle-distance runner who won the French championship in the 5,000 meters and 10,000 meters four times and the national cross-country title once.
- Jean Mailland (1937–2017) - A writer, lyricist, actor, director, and theater producer.
- Guy Bertin (1954–present) - A motorcycle racer who won the Bol d'Or, the 24 Hours of Le Mans, and the Grand Prix de France. He was runner-up in the 1980 125 cc Motorcycle World Championship.
- Di Credico (1957–present) - A figurative painter known for producing large-scale works in real-time before audiences, often categorized as performance art.
- Agnès Soral (1960–present) - A French actress known for her role in Claude Berri’s 1983 film Tchao Pantin with Coluche. Sister of writer Alain Soral.
- Karl Zéro (1961–present) - A French television presenter, radio host, journalist, and filmmaker known for satirical political films.
- Thierry Tulasne (1963–present) - A former tennis player who won the junior world championship title in 1980.
- Laurence Ferrari (1966–present) - A French journalist who has worked in television (Canal+), radio, and print media. Daughter of former Aix-les-Bains mayor Gratien Ferrari.
- Philippe Cerboneschi (1967–2019) - Known as Philippe Zdar, he was a member of the electronic music duo Cassius and a music producer.
- Hervé Renard (1968–present) - A former professional footballer who later became a coach. His last role was with Saudi Arabia women’s team, 2022–2023.
- Philippe Cavoret (1968–present) - A former bobsleigh and skeleton athlete who competed for France in World Championships and the Olympic Games.
- Soheil Ayari (1970–present) - A car driver specializing in endurance and Grand Touring races, he won the French Formula 3 Championship in 1996 and the Macau Grand Prix in 1997.

==== Other personalities ====
List of non-Aixois personalities with ties to the city.

- Alphonse de Lamartine (1790–1869) - A French poet who stayed in Aix-les-Bains (then Aix-en-Savoie) in 1816, where he wrote the poem Le Lac. A recreation of his room is exhibited at the Musée Faure. Born in Mâcon, France.
- Henri Rochefort (1831–1913) - A French journalist and politician, born Victor Henri de Rochefort-Luçay, who spent his later years in Aix-les-Bains and died there. Born in Paris, France.
- Alfred Boucher (1850–1934) - A French sculptor who settled in Aix-les-Bains in 1889 and died there in 1934. He designed the town’s war memorial, located in Place Alfred-Boucher. Born in Nogent-sur-Seine, France.
- Jean-Baptiste Charcot: (1867–1936) - A French physician and polar explorer who lived with his family in the Chalet Charcot near the thermal baths in Aix-les-Bains. Born in Neuilly-sur-Seine, France.
- Léon Brunschvicg (1869–1944) - A French philosopher associated with idealism. He spent time in Aix-les-Bains, though specific residency duration is unclear. Born in Paris, France.
- Henri Ménabréa (1882–1968) - A French lawyer, historian of Savoy, and librarian who lived in Aix-les-Bains. He was president of the Académie de Savoie. Born in Chambéry, France.
- Marie de Solms (1831–1902) - A French poet and writer who lived in Aix-les-Bains at various points. Born in Paris, France.
- Jean Longuet (1876–1938) - A French politician and member of the SFIO (French Socialist Party) who died in Aix-les-Bains. Born in London, United Kingdom.
- Jean Bretagne Charles de La Trémoille (1737–1792) - A French noble, son of Charles Armand René de La Trémoille and Marie Hortense de La Tour d’Auvergne. He died in Aix-les-Bains. Born in Paris, France.
- Daniel-Rops (Henri Petiot) (1901–1965) - A French writer and historian who resided in Aix-les-Bains during his later years and died there. Born in Épinal, France.
- Alfred Charles Ernest Franquet de Franqueville (1809–1876) - A French engineer who served as Director General of Ponts et Chaussées and Railways from 1853 until his death in Aix-les-Bains. Born in Paris, France.
- Guy Husson (1935–present) - A French hammer thrower who won the French hammer throw championship 15 times consecutively from 1954 to 1968. Affiliated with AS Aix-les-Bains from 1965 to 1983. Born in Vitry-sur-Seine, France.
- Paul Arpin (1965–present) - A long-distance runner affiliated with AS Aix-les-Bains until 1990 and from 1993 to 1995. He won multiple French championships and a European title in his discipline. Born in an unspecified location outside Aix-les-Bains.
- Ernest Munier-Chalmas (d. 1903) - A French geologist known for work on the Cretaceous period and a member of the Académie des Sciences. He died in Aix-les-Bains. Born in Metz, France.
- Georges Lorand (d. 1918) - A Belgian politician, lawyer, journalist, and Walloon activist who died in Aix-les-Bains. Born in Liège, Belgium.

Numerous personalities have visited Aix-les-Bains for spa treatments, one of the most famous being Queen Victoria. Others include Madame de Staël, Madame Récamier, Alexandre Dumas Père, Honoré de Balzac, George Sand, Marie de Solms, Guy de Maupassant, Paul Verlaine, Puvis de Chavannes, Sarah Bernhardt, Saint-Saëns, Rachmaninov, Jean Moulin, Bergson, Edwige Feuillère, Claudel, Yvonne Printemps, and Pierre Fresnay.

== See also ==
- Aix-les-Bains
- History of Savoy
- Seyssel family

=== Bibliography ===
- Lagrange, Joel (2007). Aix-les-Bains Tome 2 - l'Entre-Deux-Guerres. Alan Sutton. ISBN 978-2-84910-713-3.
- Frieh-Giraud, Geneviève (2005). Aix-les-Bains : Ville d'eaux de la Belle Époque. Dauphiné Libéré. ISBN 2-91173-986-8.
- Connille, Jean-François (2003). Aix-les-Bains. : Héritages & ouvertures. Questio. ISBN 2-91373-215-1.
- Fouger, François (2013). Le chemin de fer à Crémaillère Aix-les-Bains / Le Revard (2nd, revised. ed.). Oriade. ISBN 978-2-9519632-8-3.
- Jeudy, Jean-Marie (1998). Chambéry et Aix-les-bains autrefois. Horvath. ISBN 2-71710-920-X.
- Pallière, Johannès (1992). Aix les Bains à la belle époque, Histoire du capitalisme aixois : Ruptures, contrastes et résistances. La Fontaine de Siloé. p. 198. ISBN 978-2-908697-44-5.
- Pérouse, Gabriel (1967). La vie d'autrefois à Aix-les-bains la ville, les thermes, les baigneurs. Dardel. ASIN B0000DRAKF.
- Weigel, Anne; Ferrari, Gratien; Pallière, Johannès (1988). Ville des eaux, ville des rois : Histoire d'Aix-les-Bains, La Ville.
