= René Carron =

French banking executive

René Carron (born 1942) is a former president and Chairman of the Board of the French banking group Crédit Agricole.

== Biography ==
René Carron was born in Yenne, Savoie on 13 June 1942 where he first worked as a farmer in his hometown.

He started working for Crédit Agricole in 1981, as Chairman of the Yenne Local Bank. From 1983 to 1992, he was President of the Savoy Chamber of Agriculture. He was Savoy District Councillor from 1992 to 1998 and Vice-President of the Savoy District Council from 1995 to 1998. He was also the Mayor of Yenne in the 1990s.

He is a member of the Board of Directors of GDF Suez and Fiat SpA, and the Supervisory Board of Lagardère SCA. He chairs FARM (the Fondation pour l’Agriculture et la Ruralité dans le Monde-Foundation for World Agriculture and Rural Life). He is also a member of the Economic and Social Council.

In 2002, he became Chairman of Crédit Agricole. He was also President of CICA (Confédération Internationale du Crédit Agricole).

He was decorated Chevalier de la Légion d’honneur, Officier de l’ordre national du Mérite, Commandeur du Mérite Agricole and Chevalier des Arts et des Lettres.
