= Arbignieu =

Part of Arboys en Bugey in Auvergne-Rhône-Alpes, France

- Part of Arboys en Bugey
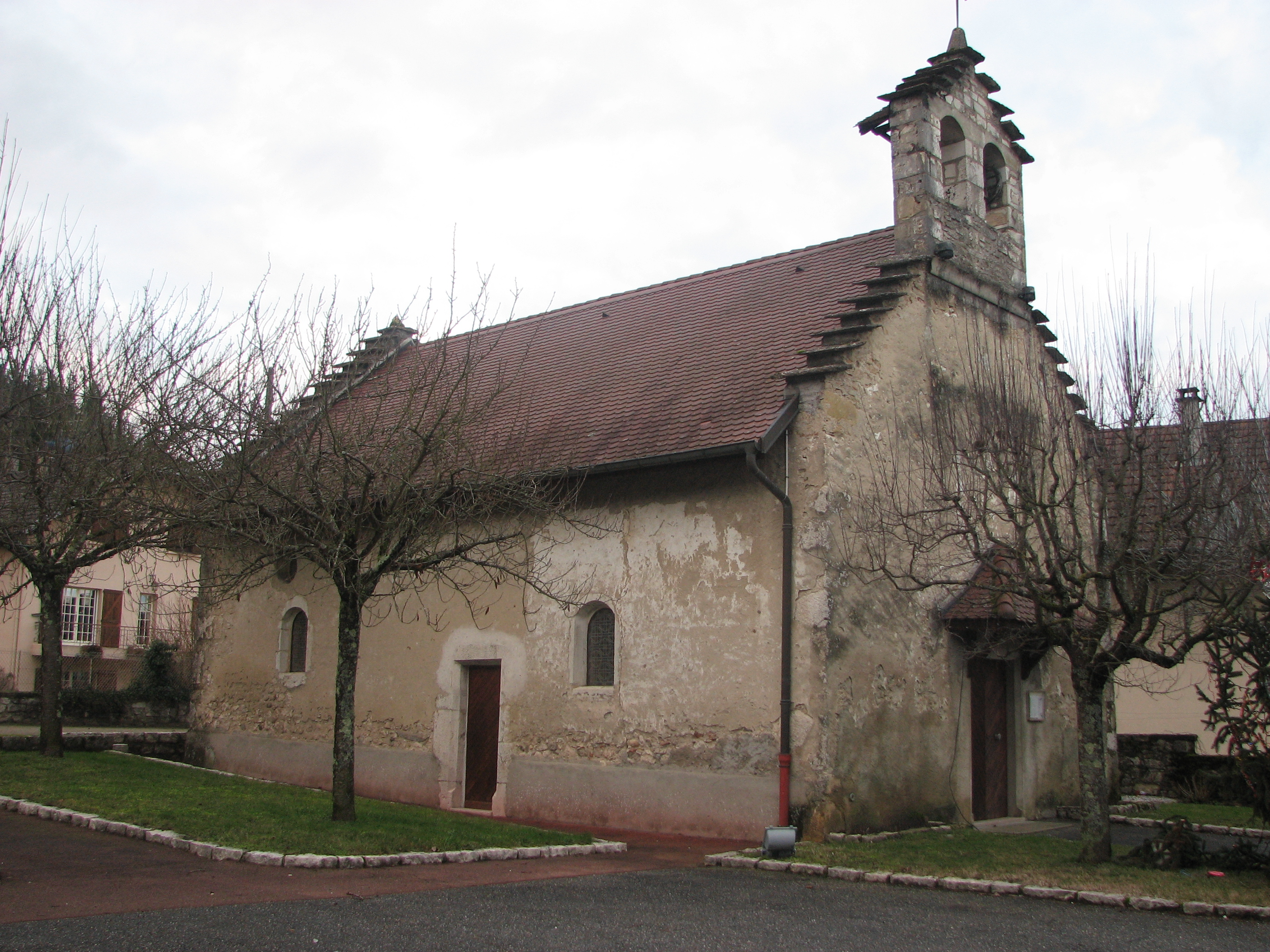
- Church in Peyzieu

- Coat of arms
- Location of Arbignieu
- Location within France Location within Auvergne-Rhône-Alpes
- Coordinates: 45°43′46″N 5°39′04″E
- Country: France
- Region: Auvergne-Rhône-Alpes
- Department: Ain
- Arrondissement: Belley
- Canton: Belley
- Commune: Arboys en Bugey
- Area^{1}: 13.07 km^{2} (5.05 sq mi)
- Elevation: 300 m (980 ft)
- Highest elevation: 495 m (1,624 ft)
- Lowest elevation: 221 m (725 ft)
- Population (2022): 559
  - Density: 42.8/km^{2} (111/sq mi)
- Time zone: UTC+01:00 (CET)
  - Summer (DST): UTC+02:00 (CEST)
- Postal code: 01300
- ^{1} French Land Register data, which excludes lakes, ponds, glaciers > 1 km^{2} (0.386 sq mi or 247 acres) and river estuaries.

Arbignieu (French pronunciation: [aʁbiɲø]) is a former commune in the Ain department in the Auvergne-Rhône-Alpes region of eastern France. On 1 January 2016, it was merged into the new commune Arboys en Bugey.

== Geography ==
The commune is located 4 km south-west of Belley and 30 km north-west of Chambery. It is traversed by the Tour du Bugey trail. It lies in the Appellation d'origine contrôlée (AOC) zone for wine from Bugey with the label "Roussette du Bugey-Arbignieu".

The commune can be accessed on the D69 from Belley in the north-east which continues west to Colomieu. The D100 road also branches from the D49 at the northern edge of the commune and goes south along the eastern side of the commune joining the D10 which passes through the commune from the D992 in the east through the hamlet of Peyzieu then south-west to Saint-Bois. There are three hamlets in the commune other than Arbignieu: Thoys, Slignieu, and Peyzieu. The commune is approximately half farmland and half forest with most of the forest along the western border.

The Furans river forms the eastern border of the commune and then flows east to join the Rhone. The Ruisseau d'Armaille flows from west to east across the commune into the Furans.

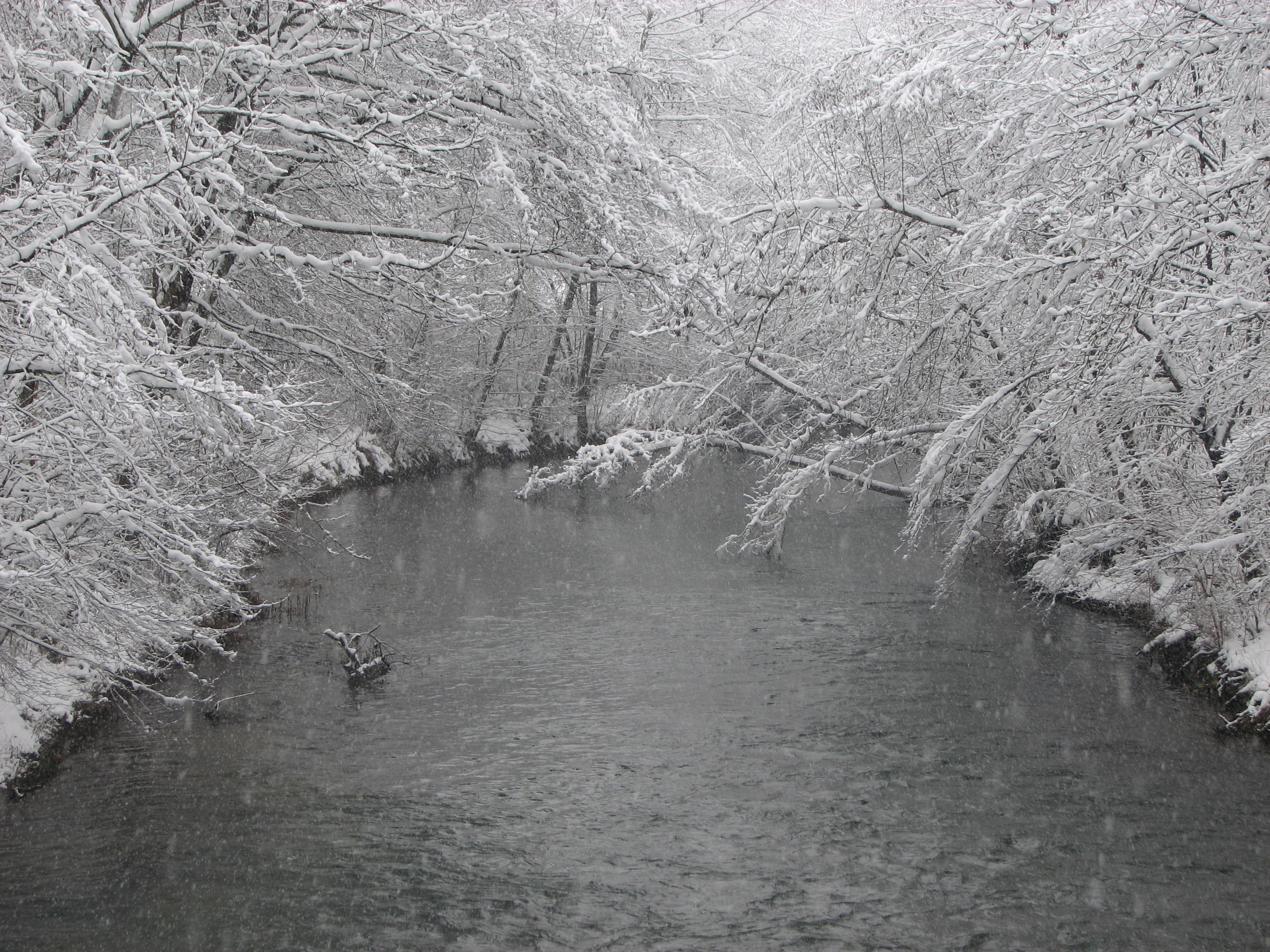
The Furans near Peyzieu

== Administration ==
List of mayors of Arbignieu

From	To	Name	Party	Position
1995	2014	Daniel Girardet		
2014	2015	Charles Berger		

== Population ==
The inhabitants of the commune are known as Arbignolans or Arbignolanes in French.

Historical population
Year	Pop.	±% p.a.
2006	464	—
2011	484	+0.85%
2022	559	+1.32%
Source: INSEE

== Sites and monuments ==
- The Ball of Gargantua (stone cups)
- The ruins of the Chateau of Longecombe, a former Fief owned by the Luyrieu Family in the 14th century.
- The Fortified house of Thoy or Thuey
- General Parra's House (18th century) at Sillignieu
- The Church of Peyzieu, a hamlet in Arbignieu

== Notable people linked to the commune ==
- Césaire Nivière (1799-1879), agronomist, was born in Peyzieu in the current territory of the commune.

== See also ==
- Communes of the Ain department
