= Hôtel de Ville, Aix-les-Bains =

Town hall in Aix-les-Bains, France

Hôtel de Ville
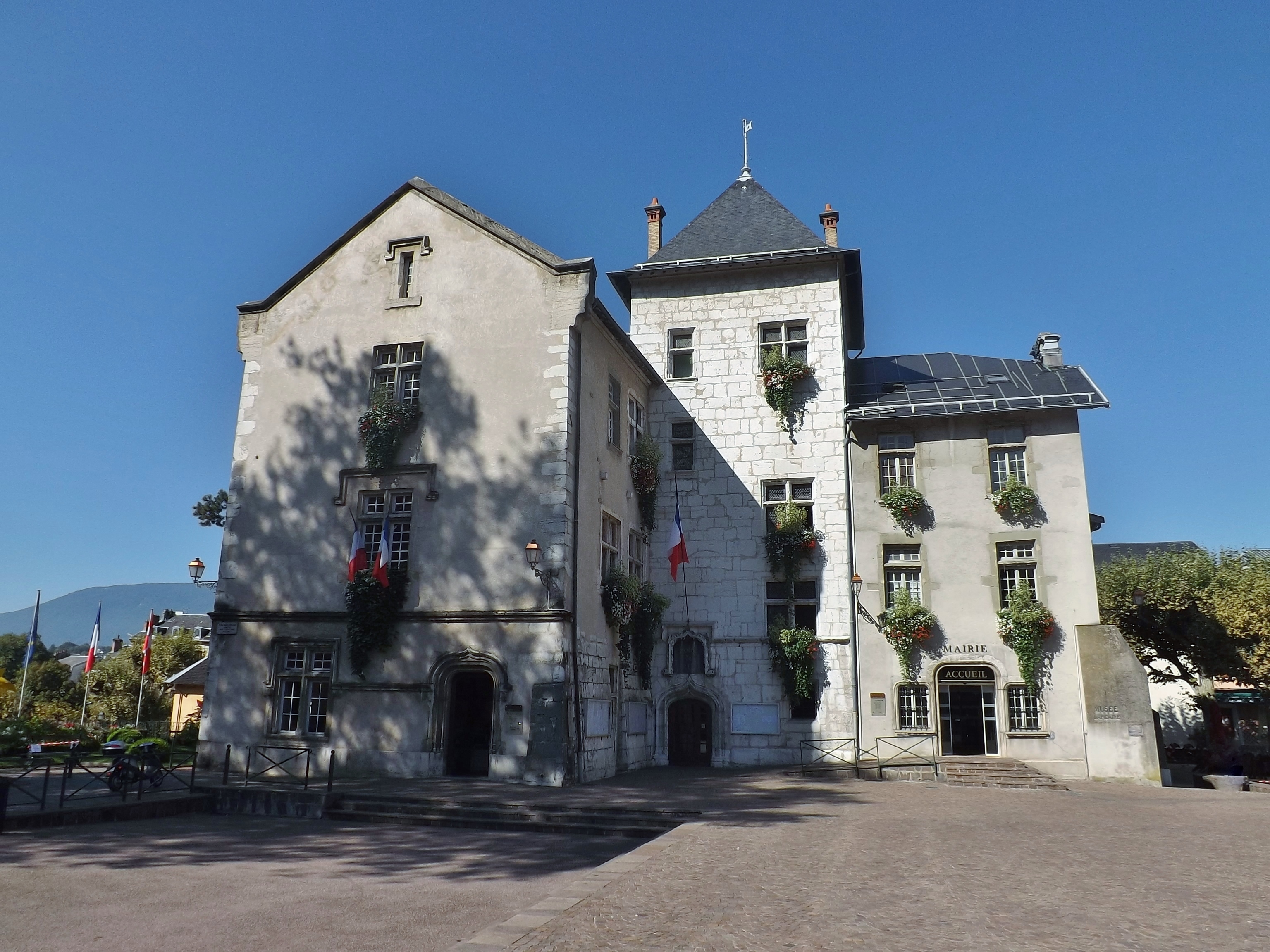
- The main frontage of the Hôtel de Ville in September 2013

General information
- Type: City hall
- Architectural style: Gothic Revival style
- Location: Aix-les-Bains, France
- Coordinates: 45.6886°N 5.9147°E
- Completed: c.1571

Monument historique
- Official name: Hôtel de ville (ancien château des Marquis d'Aix)
- Type: Inscrit
- Designated: 1890
- Reference no.: PA00118171

The Hôtel de Ville (French pronunciation: [otɛl də vil], City Hall) is a municipal building in Aix-les-Bains, Savoie in southeastern France, standing on Place Maurice Mollard. It was designated a monument historique by the French government in 1890.

== History ==
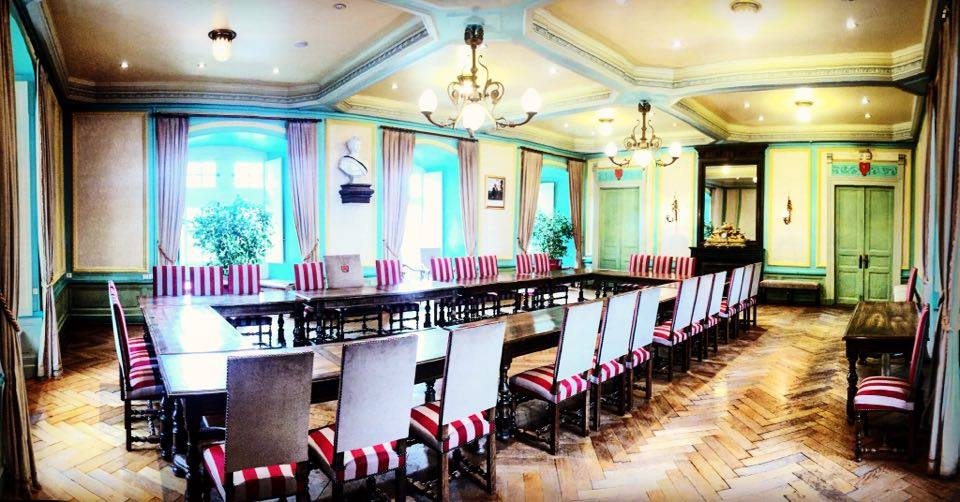
The Salon d'Honneur

The first town hall in Aix-les-Bains was a building on Place Centrale (now Place Carnot) which the town council purchased in around 1793. Shortly after Savoy had been ceded by the Kingdom of Sardinia to France under the Treaty of Turin in 1860, the council, led by a new mayor, Gaspard Davat, decided to acquire a more substantial municipal building. The building they selected was the Château des Marquis d'Aix. The location was just to the south of a small Roman monument, known as the Temple of Diana, which dated from the 2nd century. The château had its origins in a fort, of which little remains, dating from the 11th century.

The central tower, also referred to as the keep, was commissioned by the Seyssel family in around 1200. Later members of the Seyssel family included Archbishop Claude de Seyssel, who served as Archbishop of Turin from 1517 to 1520. The main part of the current structure, including the grand staircase, was commissioned by Baroness Isabeau de la Roche-Andry, shortly after her marriage to François de La Chambre, 1st Marquis d'Aix, in 1571.

In the mid-18th century, during the War of the Austrian Succession, Spanish troops caused significant damage to the building. In 1793, it was converted into a military hospital and, in 1813, it became a civilian hospital, founded by Queen Hortense and operated by the Sisters of St. Joseph. In 1821, Thomas de Seyssel, 10th Marquis d'Aix, leased the building to the Société du Cercle who, in 1824, transformed it into a casino, based on the designs of Ernesto Mélano. Subsequent expansion, in the 1830s and 1840s, included an extension to the west, to create a library and an orangery, and an expansion to the east to create a ballroom. The complex continued to be used as a casino until 1849, and was then acquired by the town council in 1866.

Internally, the principal new room created was the Salon d'Honneur, which was finely decorated, on the first floor.
