= Saint-Paul-sur-Yenne =

Saint-Paul-sur-Yenne San Pou (Savoyard)
- Commune
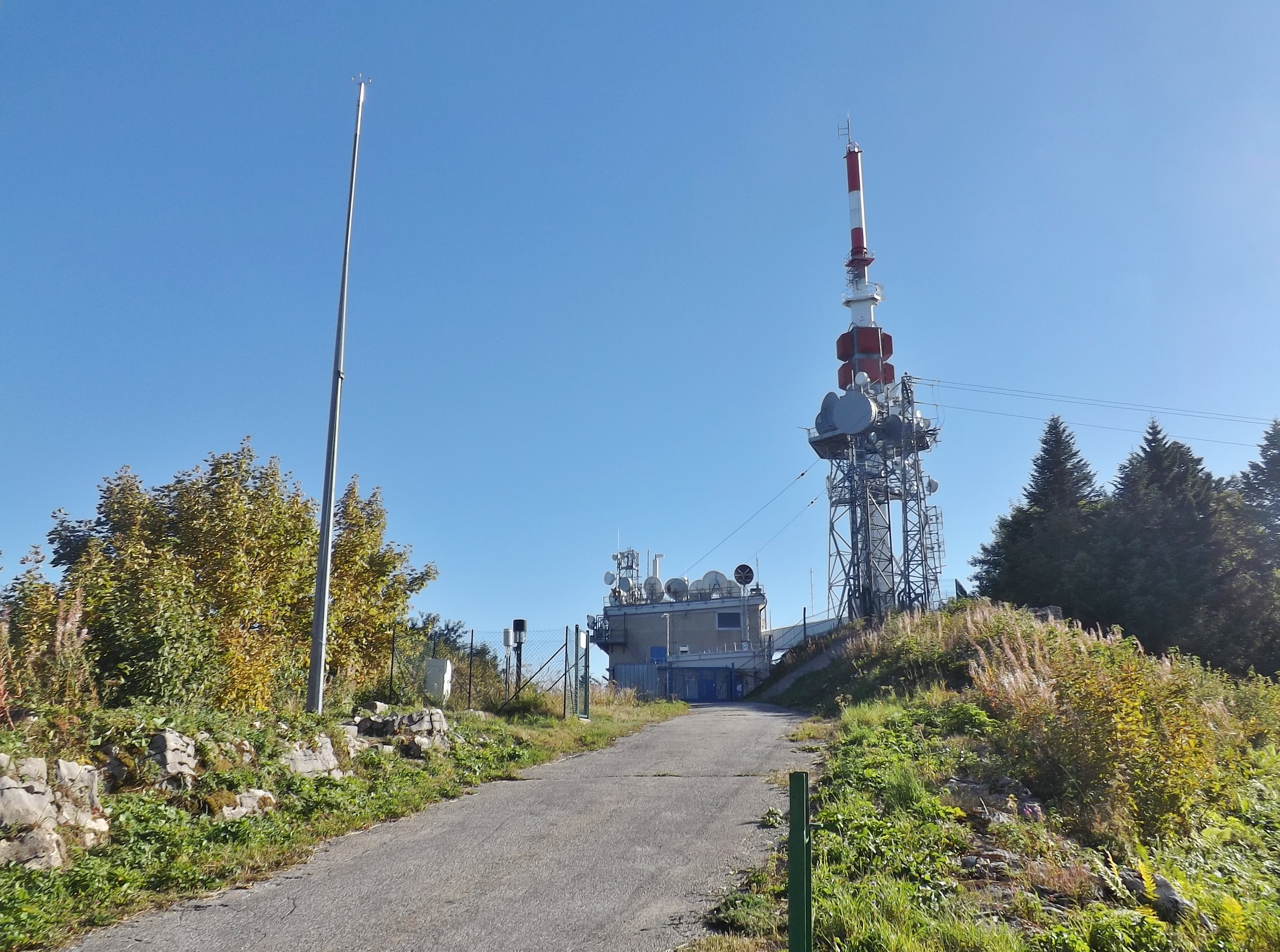
- The antenna tower and mast of le mont du Chat

- Coat of arms
- Location of Saint-Paul-sur-Yenne
- Location within France Location within Auvergne-Rhône-Alpes
- Coordinates: 45°40′42″N 5°47′08″E
- Country: France
- Region: Auvergne-Rhône-Alpes
- Department: Savoie
- Arrondissement: Chambéry
- Canton: Bugey savoyard
- Intercommunality: Yenne

Government
  - Mayor (2020–2026): Laurence Boiron
- Area^{1}: 13.25 km^{2} (5.12 sq mi)
- Highest elevation: 1,496 m (4,908 ft)
- Lowest elevation: 284 m (932 ft)
- Population (2023): 747
  - Density: 56.4/km^{2} (146/sq mi)
- Time zone: UTC+01:00 (CET)
  - Summer (DST): UTC+02:00 (CEST)
- INSEE/Postal code: 73269 /73170
- ^{1} French Land Register data, which excludes lakes, ponds, glaciers > 1 km^{2} (0.386 sq mi or 247 acres) and river estuaries.

Saint-Paul-sur-Yenne (French pronunciation: [sɛ̃ pɔl syʁ jɛn], literally Saint-Paul on Yenne; before 2024: Saint-Paul; Savoyard: San Pou) is a commune in the Savoie department in the Auvergne-Rhône-Alpes region in south-eastern France.

== See also ==
- Communes of the Savoie department
