= Arboys en Bugey =

Commune in Auvergne-Rhône-Alpes, France

- Commune
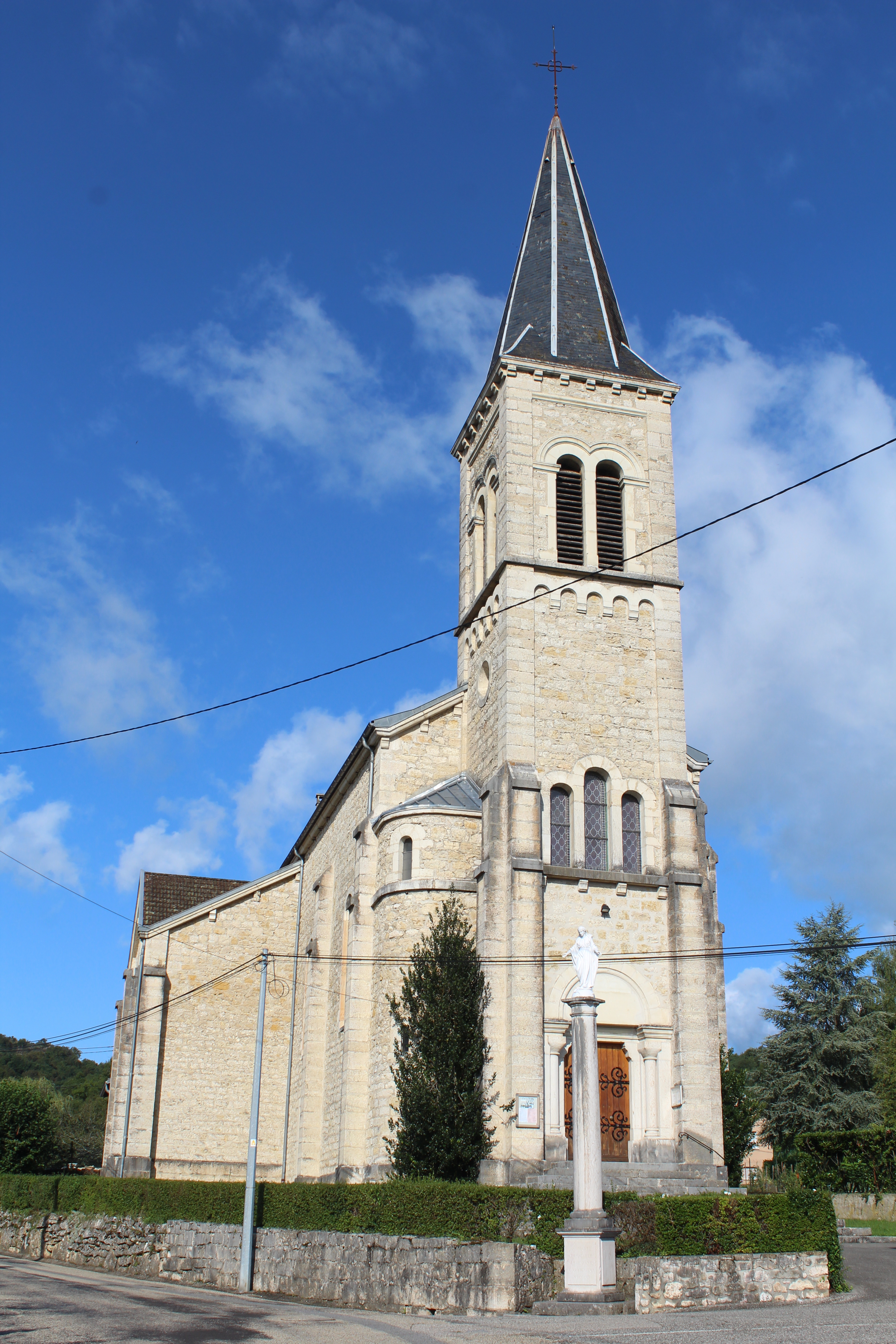
- Location of Arboys en Bugey
- Location within France Location within Auvergne-Rhône-Alpes
- Coordinates: 45°43′44″N 5°39′04″E
- Country: France
- Region: Auvergne-Rhône-Alpes
- Department: Ain
- Arrondissement: Belley
- Canton: Belley
- Intercommunality: Bugey Sud

Government
  - Mayor (2026–32): Joël Bordonnat
- Area^{1}: 22.49 km^{2} (8.68 sq mi)
- Population (2023): 710
  - Density: 32/km^{2} (82/sq mi)
- Time zone: UTC+01:00 (CET)
  - Summer (DST): UTC+02:00 (CEST)
- INSEE/Postal code: 01015 /01300
- ^{1} French Land Register data, which excludes lakes, ponds, glaciers > 1 km^{2} (0.386 sq mi or 247 acres) and river estuaries.

Arboys en Bugey (French pronunciation: [aʁbwa ɑ̃ byʒɛ], literally Arboys in Bugey) is a commune in the Ain department of central-eastern France. It was incorporated on 1 January 2016 in the amalgamation of the former communes of Arbignieu and Saint-Bois.

== See also ==
- Communes of the Ain department
