= Meyrieux-Trouet =

Meyrieux-Trouet Mériœx (Savoyard)
- Commune
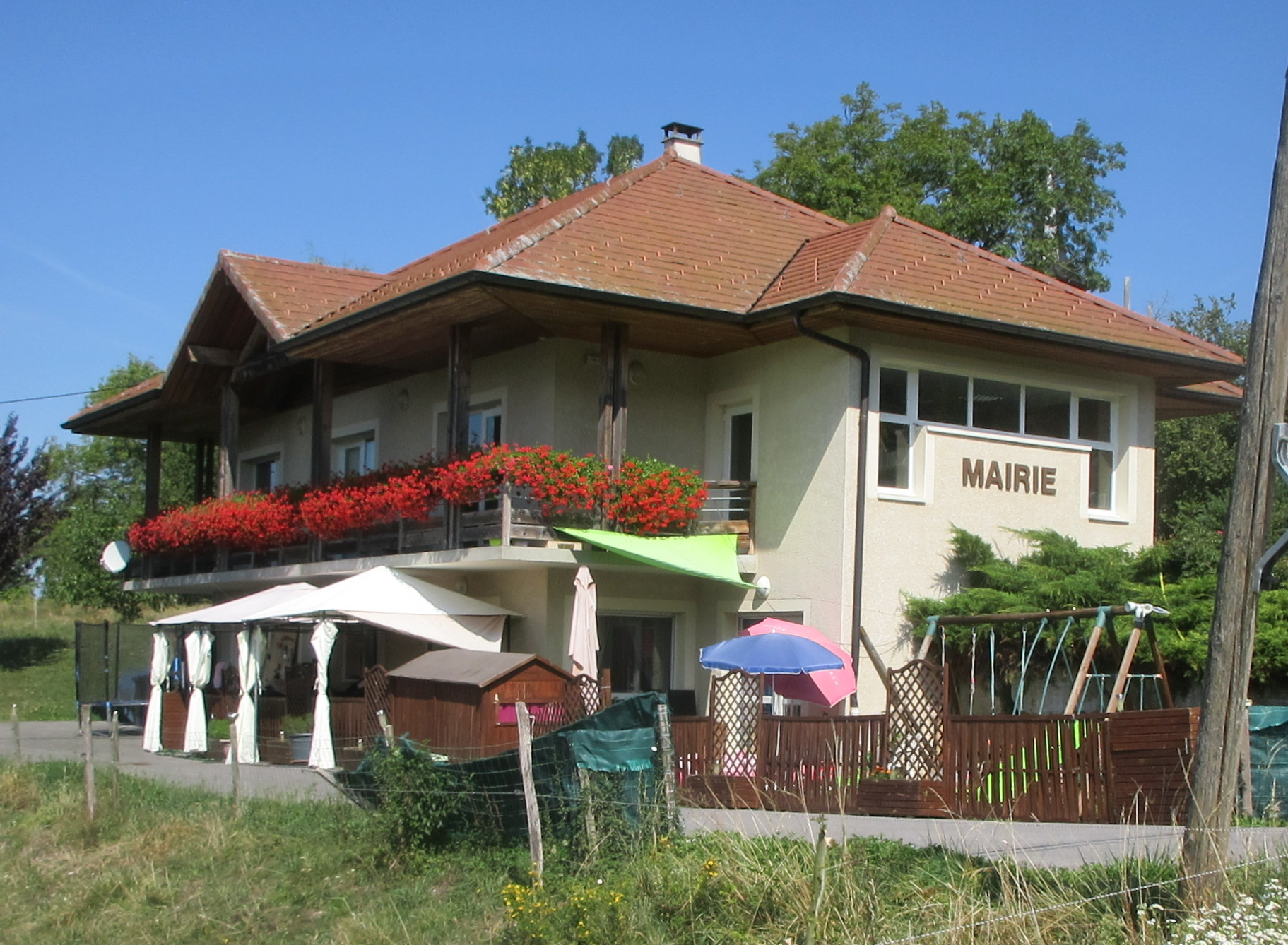
- Meyrieux-Trouet Town hall
- Location of Meyrieux-Trouet
- Location within France Location within Auvergne-Rhône-Alpes
- Coordinates: 45°38′38″N 5°46′54″E
- Country: France
- Region: Auvergne-Rhône-Alpes
- Department: Savoie
- Arrondissement: Chambéry
- Canton: Bugey savoyard
- Intercommunality: Yenne

Government
  - Mayor (2020–2026): Jean-Jacques Dantin
- Area^{1}: 11.05 km^{2} (4.27 sq mi)
- Highest elevation: 1,480 m (4,860 ft)
- Lowest elevation: 359 m (1,178 ft)
- Population (2023): 354
  - Density: 32.0/km^{2} (83.0/sq mi)
- Time zone: UTC+01:00 (CET)
  - Summer (DST): UTC+02:00 (CEST)
- INSEE/Postal code: 73156 /73170
- ^{1} French Land Register data, which excludes lakes, ponds, glaciers > 1 km^{2} (0.386 sq mi or 247 acres) and river estuaries.

Meyrieux-Trouet (Savoyard: Mériœx) is a commune in the Savoie department in the Auvergne-Rhône-Alpes region in south-eastern France.

== See also ==
- Communes of the Savoie department
