= Laure Diebold =

French resistance member (1915–1965)

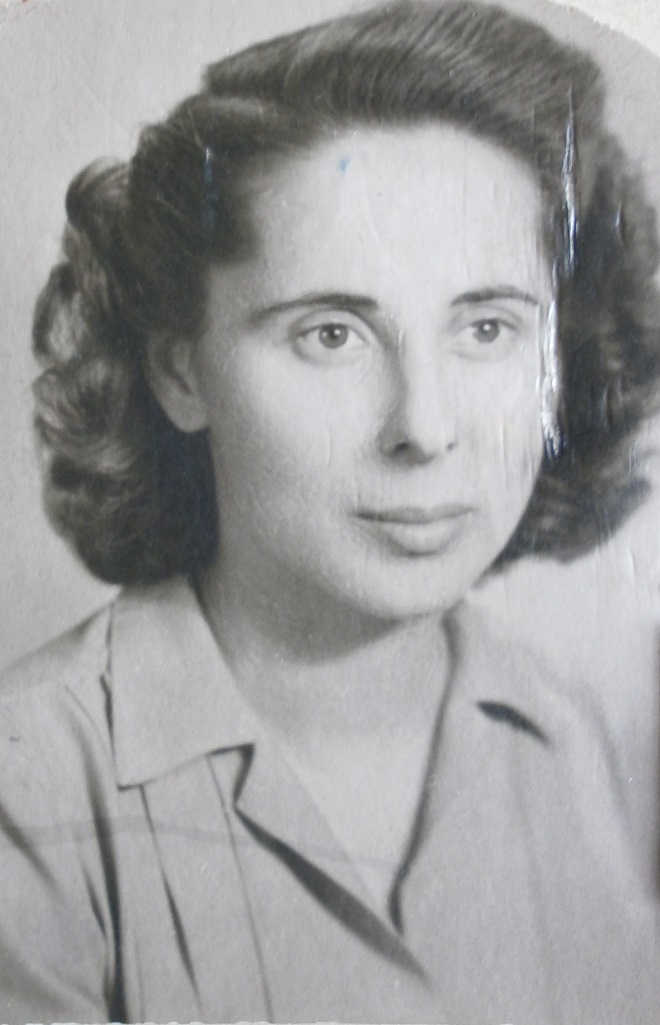
Laure Diebold

Laure Diebold, sometimes written Laure Diebolt (10 January 1915 – 17 October 1965) was a high-profile female member of the French Resistance during World War II. She was also the private secretary of Jean Moulin before being arrested then deported from 1943 to 1945 to the Nazi camp of Auschwitz, Ravensbrück and finally Buchenwald. Moreover, she is one of only six female resistants to be awarded the title Compagnon de la Libération.

== Life ==
Diebold was born Laurentine Mutschler in Erstein (Alsace-Lorraine, part of the German Empire) to a French patriot family on 10 January 1915 (one of her uncle having gone to war with the French army in World War I). She spent her childhood in Sainte-Marie-aux-Mines where her parents lived from the year 1922. In 1918 she becomes a French citizen. At the end of her studies, just before World War II, she became an administrative assistant in the "Etablissements Baumgartner".

In 1940, Mutschler integrated the resistance network "A.V." (which means "Army of the Volunteers" in French) of Dr. Bareiss in the annexed Alsace, and, at the same time, became a special agent under the name "Mado" in another resistance network known as "Mithridate". Her secret job led her to host in her home in Alsace escaped war prisoners before helping them to escape to France; but just before Christmas 1941, she had to leave Alsace secretly. She went to Lyon in the free south of France hidden in a locomotive. There, she worked as an administrative assistant in the service which works with refugees from Alsace; and from 1942, she collected information for her resistance network "Mithridate" before encoding them and sending them to London by post mail.

On January 31, 1942, Mutschler was married to Eugène Diebold, who also escaped to Lyon. On 18 July 1942 she was arrested with her husband, but they were released by the Gestapo on 24. They moved to Aix-les-Bains where Mutschler became known only as "Mona".

In September 1942 she was promoted to the rank of Lieutenant of the Free French Forces. She was assigned to the position of private secretary of Jean Moulin at the beginning of August where she becomes "Mado", agent 8382; she only meets him once on 8 December 1942. After the arrest of Jean Moulin in 1943, she was sent to Paris to be the secretary of Georges Bidault.

She was arrested again on 23 November 1943 with her husband and sent to Fresnes Prison. She was not tortured because she convinced her Nazi captors that she was just a secretary and not a major figure in the resistance network. Nevertheless, she was sent to the Nazi camp of Schirmeck on 17 January 1944, and between January 1944 and her liberation in April 1945 she was transferred to Auschwitz, Ravensbrück and Buchenwald.

Freed by the Americans in April 1945, she was back in Paris on 16 May. She worked at the direction générale des études et recherches. In 1947, she was in Moscow with her old manager Georges Bidault. In 1957, she became a secretary and librarian at the Rhodiacéta enterprise.

Diebold died suddenly on 17 October 1965 in Lyon and, in accordance with her last wishes, she was buried in her childhood commune of Sainte-Marie-aux-Mines in Alsace, having received military honours in cathedral Saint-Jean de Lyon. Today a street in Lyon and a square in Sainte-Marie-aux-Mines are named in her honour.

== Honour ==
- Knight of the Légion d'Honneur
- Compagnon de la Libération - legislative bill of 20 November 1944
- Croix de guerre 1939-1945
- Médaille de la Résistance with rosette
- Médaille des Services Volontaires dans la France Libre
