= Saint-Cassin =

- Commune
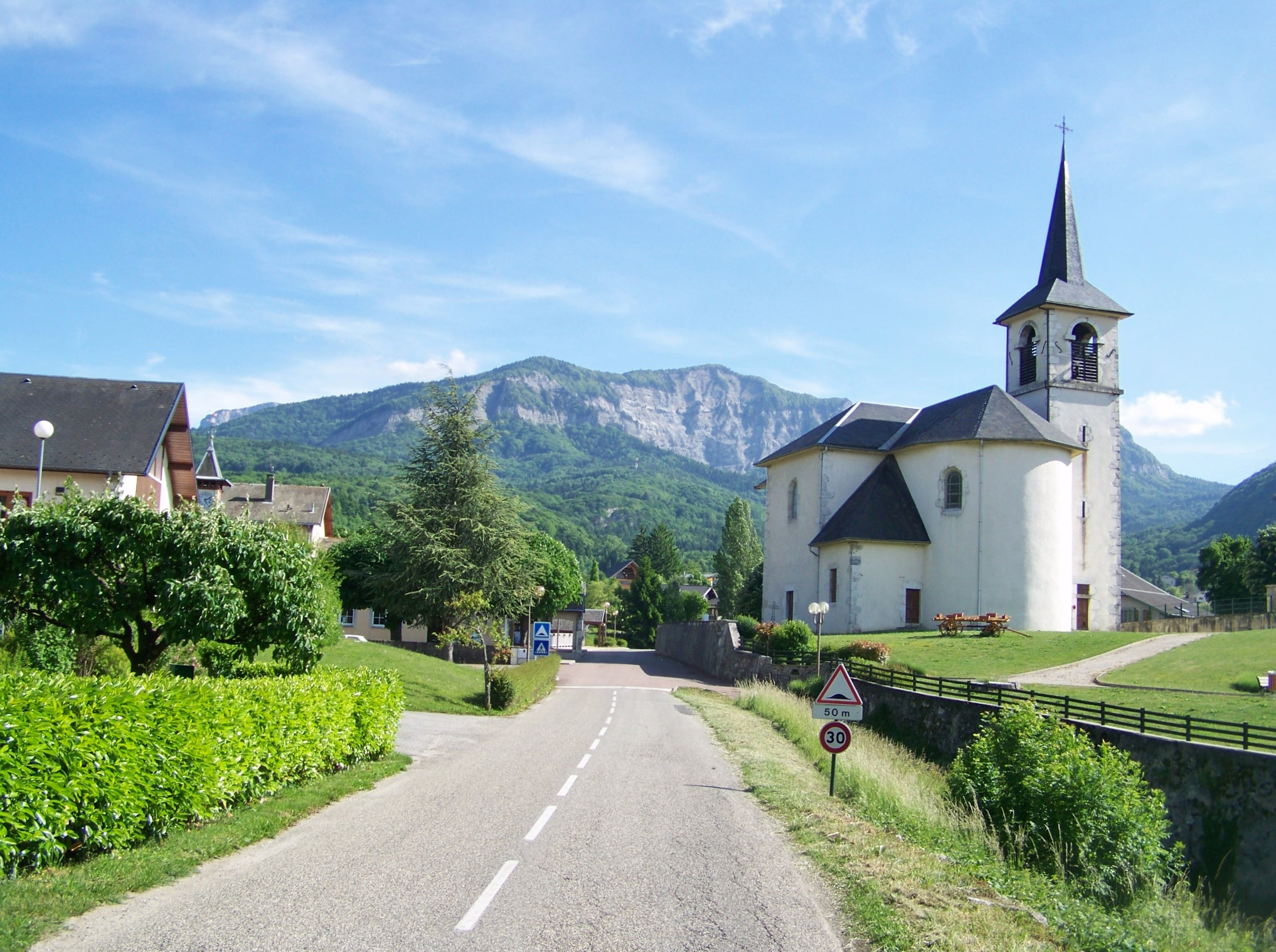
- The church and road into Saint-Cassin
- Location of Saint-Cassin
- Location within France Location within Auvergne-Rhône-Alpes
- Coordinates: 45°32′20″N 5°53′40″E
- Country: France
- Region: Auvergne-Rhône-Alpes
- Department: Savoie
- Arrondissement: Chambéry
- Canton: Le Pont-de-Beauvoisin
- Intercommunality: Grand Chambéry

Government
  - Mayor (2020–2026): Jocelyne Gougou
- Area^{1}: 14.79 km^{2} (5.71 sq mi)
- Highest elevation: 1,540 m (5,050 ft)
- Lowest elevation: 310 m (1,020 ft)
- Population (2023): 1,046
  - Density: 70.72/km^{2} (183.2/sq mi)
- Time zone: UTC+01:00 (CET)
  - Summer (DST): UTC+02:00 (CEST)
- INSEE/Postal code: 73228 /73160
- Website: www.saint-cassin.com
- ^{1} French Land Register data, which excludes lakes, ponds, glaciers > 1 km^{2} (0.386 sq mi or 247 acres) and river estuaries.

Saint-Cassin (French pronunciation: [sɛ̃ kasɛ̃]; Arpitan: Sènt-Câssin) is a commune in the Savoie department in the Auvergne-Rhône-Alpes region in southeastern France. It is part of the urban area of Chambéry.

== See also ==
- Communes of the Savoie department
