= Traize =

Traize Trazè (Savoyard)
- Commune
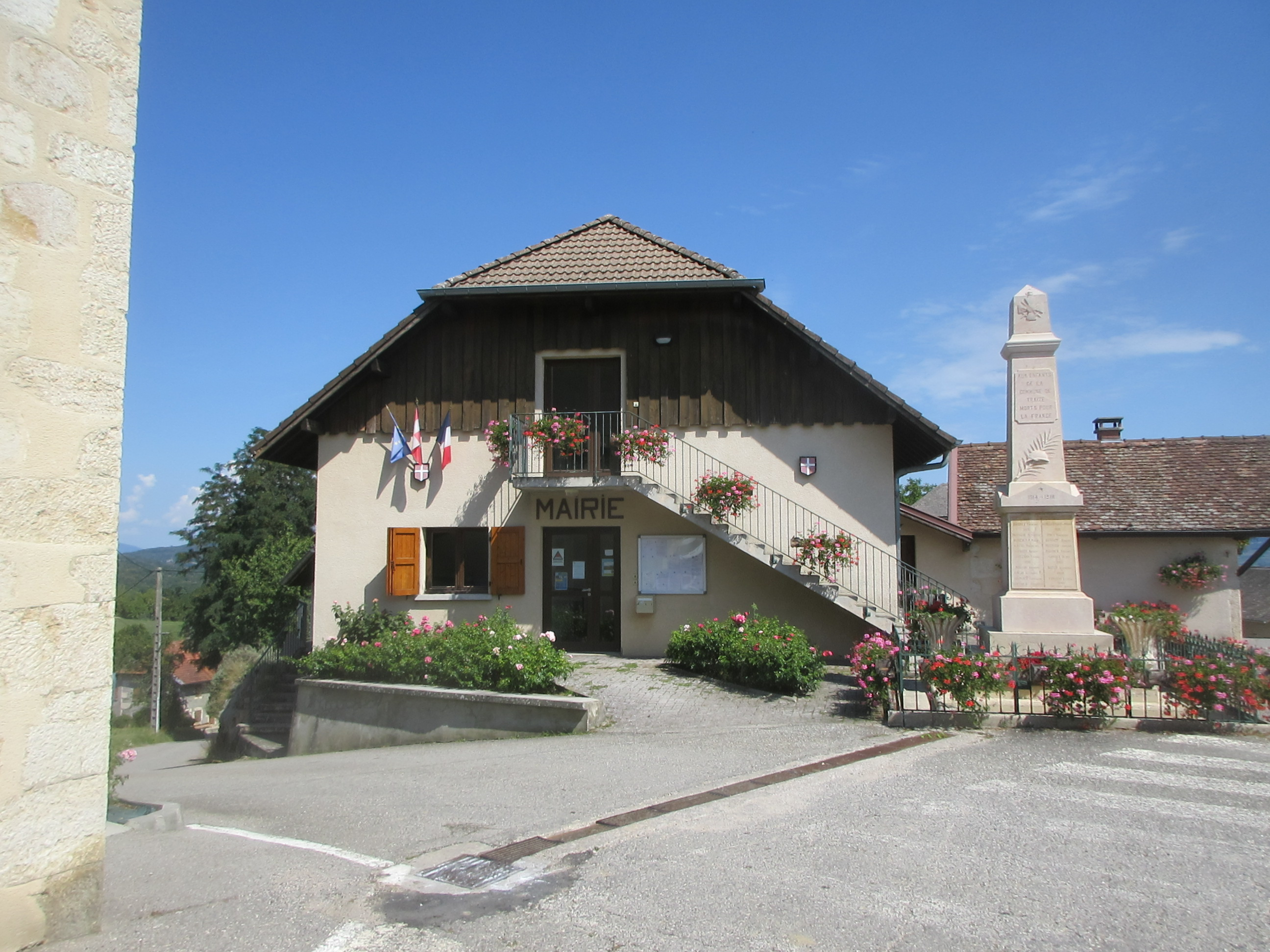
- Town hall and war memorial
- Location of Traize
- Location within France Location within Auvergne-Rhône-Alpes
- Coordinates: 45°40′19″N 5°44′48″E
- Country: France
- Region: Auvergne-Rhône-Alpes
- Department: Savoie
- Arrondissement: Chambéry
- Canton: Bugey savoyard
- Intercommunality: Yenne

Government
  - Mayor (2020–2026): Guy Dumollard
- Area^{1}: 9.48 km^{2} (3.66 sq mi)
- Highest elevation: 700 m (2,300 ft)
- Lowest elevation: 270 m (890 ft)
- Population (2023): 335
  - Density: 35.3/km^{2} (91.5/sq mi)
- Time zone: UTC+01:00 (CET)
  - Summer (DST): UTC+02:00 (CEST)
- INSEE/Postal code: 73299 /73170
- ^{1} French Land Register data, which excludes lakes, ponds, glaciers > 1 km^{2} (0.386 sq mi or 247 acres) and river estuaries.

Traize (French pronunciation: [tʁɛz]; Savoyard: Trazè) is a commune in the Savoie department in the Auvergne-Rhône-Alpes region in south-eastern France.

== See also ==
- Communes of the Savoie department
