= Saint-Bois =

Part of Arboys en Bugey in Auvergne-Rhône-Alpes, France

- Part of Arboys en Bugey
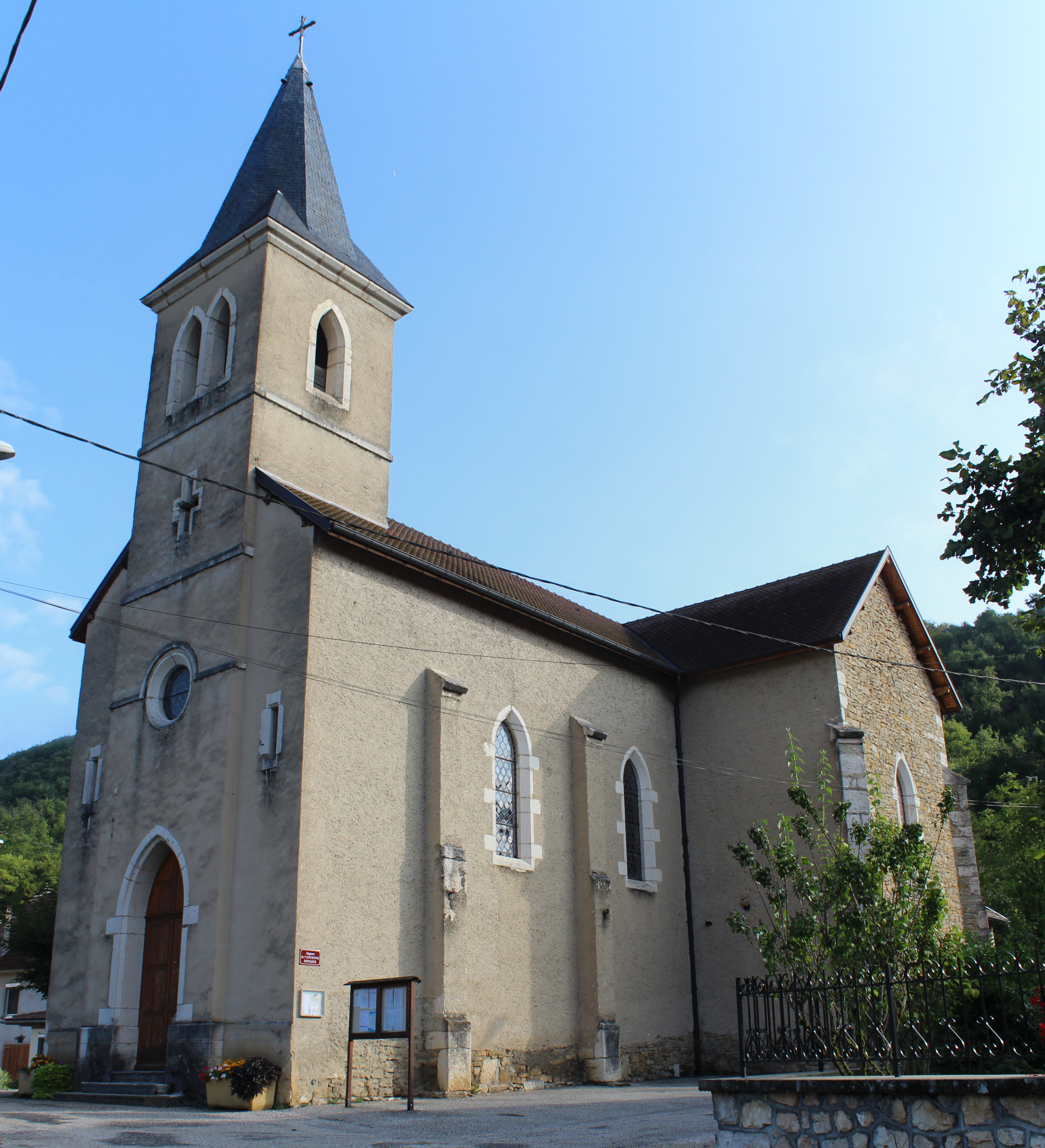
- Église St Baudille
- Location of Saint-Bois
- Location within France Location within Auvergne-Rhône-Alpes
- Coordinates: 45°42′00″N 5°38′00″E
- Country: France
- Region: Auvergne-Rhône-Alpes
- Department: Ain
- Arrondissement: Belley
- Canton: Belley
- Commune: Arboys en Bugey
- Area^{1}: 9.22 km^{2} (3.56 sq mi)
- Elevation: 320 m (1,050 ft)
- Highest elevation: 778 m (2,552 ft)
- Lowest elevation: 301 m (988 ft)
- Population (2022): 129
  - Density: 14.0/km^{2} (36.2/sq mi)
- Time zone: UTC+01:00 (CET)
  - Summer (DST): UTC+02:00 (CEST)
- Postal code: 01300
- ^{1} French Land Register data, which excludes lakes, ponds, glaciers > 1 km^{2} (0.386 sq mi or 247 acres) and river estuaries.

Saint-Bois (French pronunciation: [sɛ̃ bwa]) is a former commune in the Ain department in eastern France. On 1 January 2016, it was merged into the new commune Arboys en Bugey.

== Population ==
Historical population
Year	Pop.	±% p.a.
2006	116	—
2011	127	+1.83%
2022	129	+0.14%
Source: INSEE

== See also ==
- Communes of the Ain department
