= Yenne =

Yenne Yèna (Savoyard)
- Commune
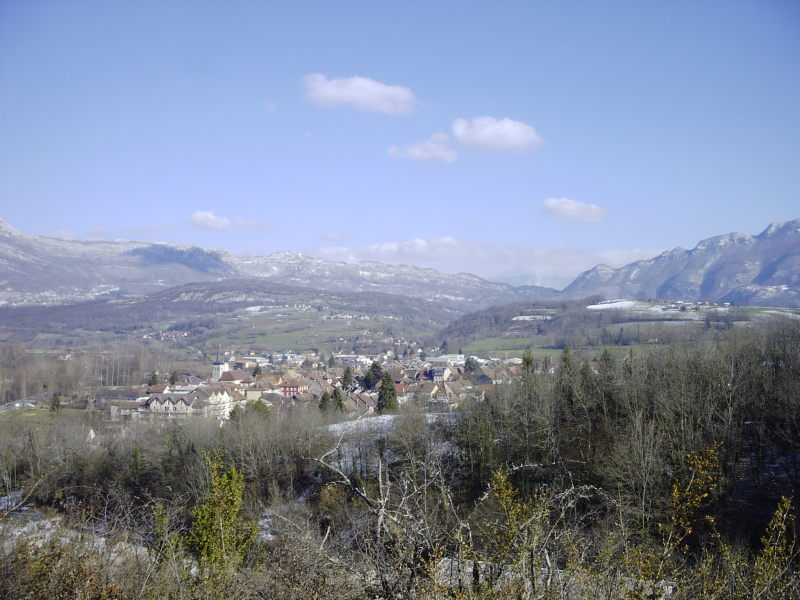
- A general view of Yenne

- Coat of arms
- Location of Yenne
- Location within France Location within Auvergne-Rhône-Alpes
- Coordinates: 45°42′06″N 5°45′38″E
- Country: France
- Region: Auvergne-Rhône-Alpes
- Department: Savoie
- Arrondissement: Chambéry
- Canton: Bugey savoyard
- Intercommunality: Yenne

Government
  - Mayor (2020–2026): François Moiroud
- Area^{1}: 23.36 km^{2} (9.02 sq mi)
- Highest elevation: 610 m (2,000 ft)
- Lowest elevation: 220 m (720 ft)
- Population (2023): 3,026
  - Density: 129.5/km^{2} (335.5/sq mi)
- Time zone: UTC+01:00 (CET)
  - Summer (DST): UTC+02:00 (CEST)
- INSEE/Postal code: 73330 /73170
- Website: www.mairie-yenne.fr
- ^{1} French Land Register data, which excludes lakes, ponds, glaciers > 1 km^{2} (0.386 sq mi or 247 acres) and river estuaries.

Yenne (French: [jɛn]; Savoyard: Yèna) is a commune in the Savoie department in the Auvergne-Rhône-Alpes region in south-eastern France. It is located on the east side of the Rhône, by the "Gorges de la Balme."

== Population ==
Historical population
Year	Pop.	±% p.a.
1968	2,063	—
1975	2,152	+0.61%
1982	2,359	+1.32%
1990	2,449	+0.47%
1999	2,599	+0.66%
2007	2,841	+1.12%
2012	2,969	+0.89%
2017	2,978	+0.06%
2023	3,026	+0.27%
Source: INSEE

== See also ==
- Communes of the Savoie department
